= Special Occupational Taxpayers =

Group of Federal Firearm Licensees in the United States

Special Occupational Taxpayers are a group of Federal Firearm Licensees in the United States who manufacture, import and/or transfer NFA weapons. The National Firearms Act Special Occupational Taxpayer class is part of the Internal Revenue Code of 1986.

The Special Occupational Tax is due on or before July 1 of each year. The tax rate for every importer and manufacturer is $1,000 per year or part of a year. The tax rate for each dealer is $500 per year or part of a year. Importers and manufacturers engaged in business with less than $500,000 in gross receipts in the most recent taxable year are given relief in the form of a $500 reduction in SOT tax payment making the total SOT tax $500. In addition to the SOT tax, all importers and manufacturers must pay an annual excise tax to the Tax and Trade Bureau (TTB) for firearms imported or manufactured for re-sale. The excise tax applies only when the quantity of firearms imported or manufactured during the year is 50 or more.

== Special Occupational Taxpayer classes ==
Class	Usage
Class 1	Importer of NFA firearms
Class 2	Manufacturer & Dealer of NFA firearms
Class 3	Dealer of NFA firearms

To get a Class 1 SOT status, an importer FFL is needed, which are FFL Types 8 and 11.

To get a Class 2 SOT status, a manufacturer FFL is needed, which are FFL Types 7 and 10.

To get a Class 3 SOT status, a dealer FFL is needed which are FFL Types 1, 2, and 9.

== Other occupations subject to tax ==
In addition to the firearms industry, the tobacco industry is also subject to paying special (occupational) taxes, and are therefore SOTs. Specifically, manufacturers of tobacco products, manufacturers of cigarette papers and tubes, and tobacco export warehouse proprietors are subject to tax. Before 1 July 2008, segments of the alcohol trade (producers and marketers of alcohol beverages, manufacturers of non-beverage products, users of tax-free alcohol, and users and dealers of specially denatured spirits) were also subject to special (occupational) taxes. These taxes were repealed in Public Law 109–59.

== See also ==
- Bureau of Alcohol, Tobacco, Firearms, and Explosives (ATF)
- Firearm Owners Protection Act (1986)
- Form 4473
- Gun Control Act (1968)
- Gun law in the United States
- National Firearms Transfer Tax Rates
