= Brady Handgun Violence Prevention Act =

Mandate for background checks on firearm purchasers in the U.S.

- Long title: An Act to provide for a waiting period before the purchase of a handgun, and for the establishment of a national instant criminal background check system to be contacted by firearms dealers before the transfer of any firearm.
- Enacted by: the 103rd United States Congress
- Effective: February 28, 1994

Citations
- Public law: Pub. L. 103–159
- Statutes at Large: 107 Stat. 1536

Codification
- Titles amended: Title 18—Crimes and Criminal Procedure
- U.S.C. sections created: 18 U.S.C. § 925A
- U.S.C. sections amended: 18 U.S.C. §§ 921–924

Legislative history
- Introduced in the House as H.R. 1025 by Chuck Schumer (D–NY) on February 22, 1993; Passed the House on November 10, 1993 (238–189); Passed the Senate on November 20, 1993 (63–36); Reported by the joint conference committee on November 22, 1993; agreed to by the House on November 22, 1993 (238–187) and by the Senate on November 24, 1993 (voice vote); Signed into law by President Bill Clinton on November 30, 1993

United States Supreme Court cases
- Printz v. United States, 521 U.S. 898 (1997)

The Brady Handgun Violence Prevention Act (Pub.L. 103–159, 107 Stat. 1536, enacted November 30, 1993), often referred to as the Brady Act, the Brady Bill or the Brady Handgun Bill, is an Act of the United States Congress that mandated federal background checks on firearm purchasers in the United States. It also imposed a five-day waiting period on purchases until the National Instant Criminal Background Check System (NICS) was implemented in 1998. Introduced by U.S. representative Chuck Schumer of New York, the Brady Act was a landmark legislative enactment during the Clinton administration. The act was appended to the end of Section 922 of Title 18, United States Code. The intention of the act was to prevent persons with previous serious convictions from purchasing firearms.

== Legislative history ==
Various iterations of the Brady Bill were discussed and rejected by Congress between 1987 and 1993, when it finally became law.

On February 4, 1987, two Ohio Democrats, Representative Edward F. Feighan and Senator Howard M. Metzenbaum, introduced the Brady Bill for the first time in the 100th Congress. In its original form, the Bill mandated a seven-day waiting period between the time a person applied for a handgun and the time the sale could be completed. The Bill was approved as an amendment to the Omnibus Drug Initiative Act by the House Judiciary Committee on a voice vote in June of the following year. However, on September 15, 1988, the Brady Bill was defeated in the House by a vote of 228-182.

In March 1991, the Bill was introduced again into the House of Representatives by Representative Chuck Schumer, but was never brought to a vote.

On February 22, 1993, the bill was reintroduced for the final time by Rep. Schumer leading to the final version being passed in the 103rd Congress on November 11, 1993. It was signed into law by President Bill Clinton on November 30, 1993, and the law went into effect on February 28, 1994.

== Provisions ==
The Brady Bill requires that background checks be conducted on individuals before a firearm may be purchased from a federally licensed dealer, manufacturer or importer—unless an exception applies. If there are no additional state restrictions, a firearm may be transferred to an individual upon approval by the National Instant Criminal Background Check System (NICS) maintained by the FBI. In some states, proof of a previous background check can be used to bypass the NICS check. For example, a state-issued concealed carry permit usually includes a background check equivalent to the one required by the Act. Other alternatives to the NICS check include state-issued handgun purchase permits or mandatory state or local background checks.

In Section 922(g) of title 18, United States Code the Brady Bill prohibits certain persons from shipping or transporting any firearm in interstate or foreign commerce, or receiving any firearm which has been shipped or transported in interstate or foreign commerce, or possessing any firearm in or affecting commerce. These prohibitions apply to any person who:

1. Has been convicted in any court of a crime punishable by imprisonment for a term exceeding one year;
2. Is a fugitive from justice;
3. Is an unlawful user of or addicted to any controlled substance;
4. Has been adjudicated as a mental defective or committed to a mental institution;
5. Is an alien illegally or unlawfully in the United States;
6. Has been discharged from the Armed Forces under dishonorable conditions;
7. Having been a citizen of the United States, has renounced U.S. citizenship;
8. Is subject to a court order that restrains the person from harassing, stalking, or threatening an intimate partner or child of such intimate partner;
9. Has been convicted in any court of a misdemeanor crime of domestic violence, or;
10. Is under indictment for a crime punishable by imprisonment for a term exceeding one year.

Section 922(n) of title 18, United States Code makes it unlawful for any person who is under indictment for a crime punishable by imprisonment for a term exceeding one year to ship or transport any firearm in interstate or foreign commerce, or receive any firearm which has been shipped or transported in interstate or foreign commerce.

After a prospective buyer completes the appropriate form, the holder of a Federal Firearms License (FFL) initiates the background check by phone or computer. Most checks are determined within minutes. If a determination is not obtained within three business days then the transfer may legally be completed.

Firearm transfers by unlicensed private sellers that are "not engaged in the business" of dealing firearms are not subject to the Brady Act, but may be covered under other federal, state, and local restrictions.

The Brady Bill also does not apply to licensed Curios & Relics (C&R) collectors, but only in respect to C&R firearms. The FFL Category 03 Curio & Relic license costs $30 and is valid for three years. Licensed C&R collectors may also purchase C&R firearms from private individuals or from federal firearms dealers, whether in their home state or in another state, and ship C&R firearms in interstate commerce by common carrier. Curios or relics are defined in 27 CFR 478.11 as "Firearms which are of special interest to collectors by reason of some quality other than is associated with firearms intended for sporting use or as offensive or defensive weapons." The regulation further states:

To be recognized as curios or relics, firearms must fall within one of the following categories:

(a) Firearms which were manufactured at least 50 years prior to the current date, but not including replicas thereof;

(b) Firearms which are certified by the curator of a municipal, State, or Federal museum which exhibits firearms to be curios or relics of museum interest; or

(c) Any other firearms which derive a substantial part of their monetary value from the fact that they are novel, rare, bizarre, or because of their association with some historical figure, period, or event. Proof of qualification of a particular firearm under this category may be established by evidence of present value and evidence that like firearms are not available except as collector's items, or that the value of like firearms available in ordinary commercial channels is substantially less.

== James and Sarah Brady ==
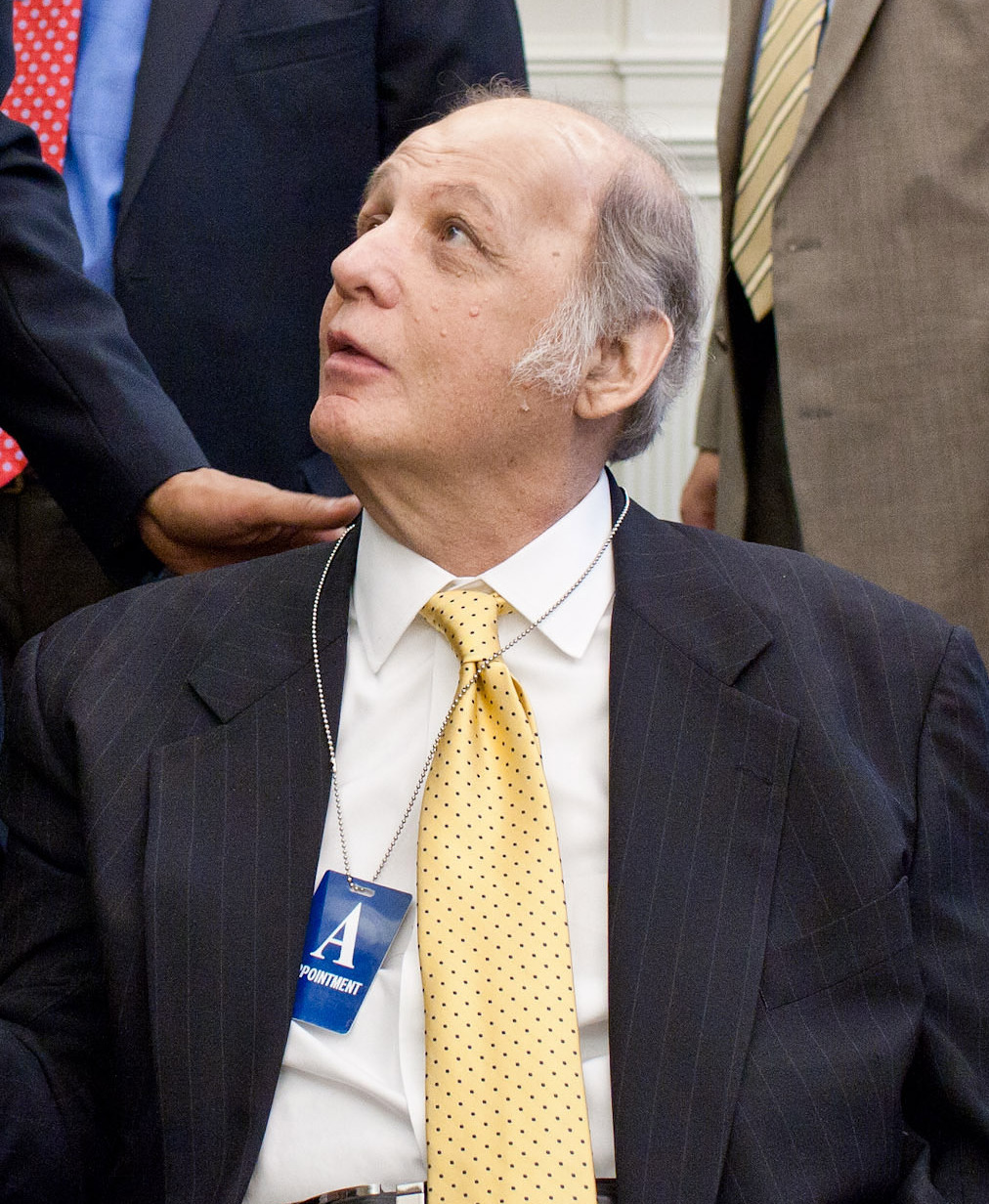
James Brady in 2011

Bill Clinton signing the act

James Brady was press secretary to President Ronald Reagan when both he and the president, along with Secret Service agent Tim McCarthy and District of Columbia police officer Thomas Delehanty, were shot on March 30, 1981, during an assassination attempt by John Hinckley Jr. Brady was shot in the head and suffered a serious wound that left him partially paralyzed for life.

John Hinckley Jr. bought the .22 caliber Röhm RG-14 revolver used in the shooting at a pawn shop in Dallas, Texas on October 13, 1980. In a purchase application that he filled out before taking possession of the revolver, he provided a false home address on the form and showed an old Texas driver's license as "proof" that he lived there. This constituted a felony offense. Additionally, Hinckley had been arrested four days earlier at the Metropolitan Airport in Nashville, Tennessee, when he attempted to board an American Airlines flight for New York with three handguns and some loose ammunition in his carry-on bag. That same day, President Jimmy Carter was in Nashville and scheduled to travel to New York. According to an attorney for his family, Hinckley had been under psychiatric care prior to his gun purchase, although "the evaluations did not alert anyone to the seriousness of his condition."

According to Sarah Brady, James Brady's wife, had a background check been conducted on Hinckley, it could have detected some, or all, of this important criminal and mental health history.

Sarah Brady became active in the gun control movement a few years after the shooting. She joined the Board of Handgun Control, Inc. (HCI) in 1985 and became its chair in 1989. Two years later, she became Chair of the center to Prevent Handgun Violence, HCI's 501(c)(3) sister organization. In 2001, the organizations were renamed the Brady Campaign to Prevent Gun Violence and the Brady Center to Prevent Gun Violence in honor of James and Sarah.

The Brady bill would require the handgun dealer to provide a copy of the prospective purchaser's sworn statement to local law enforcement authorities so that background checks could be made. Based upon the evidence in states that already have handgun purchase waiting periods, this bill—on a nationwide scale—can't help but stop thousands of illegal handgun purchases.

— President Ronald Reagan, March 31, 1991

On February 4, 1987, the Brady Act was introduced in the U.S. Congress for the first time. Sarah Brady and HCI made the passage of the Brady bill, as it was commonly called, their top legislative priority. In a March 1991 editorial, President Reagan opined that the Brady Act would provide a crucial "enforcement mechanism" to end the "honor system" of the 1968 Gun Control Act and "can't help but stop thousands of illegal handgun purchases."

James and Sarah Brady were guests of honor when President Bill Clinton signed the Brady Act into law on November 30, 1993. President Clinton has stated, "If it hadn't been for them, we would not have passed the Brady Law." In December 2000, the Boards of Trustees for HCI and the center to Prevent Handgun Violence voted to honor James and Sarah Brady's hard work and commitment to gun control by renaming the two organizations the Brady Campaign to Prevent Gun Violence and the Brady Center to Prevent Gun Violence.

In 2000, controversy arose when Sarah Brady purchased a .30-06 Springfield rifle in Delaware for her son. Gun rights groups claimed that this action was a straw purchase, intended to avoid the NICS, and may have also violated Delaware firearms purchase laws. No charges were ever filed against Sarah Brady, however. A firearm purchased as a gift is not considered a straw purchase under U.S. federal law if the recipient may legally possess it. Critics pointed out, however, that private firearm transfers like the one made by Sarah Brady are a common concern of gun control advocates (although exemptions for family members have been allowed in past legislation to regulate such sales).

== Dissenting views and complaints from the National Rifle Association ==
Opponents of the Act argued it would have limited impact on the nation's issue with violent crime because its provisions do little to stop guns from being obtained illegally, and only deal with firearm sales from registered dealers.

=== National Rifle Association ===
After the Brady Act was originally proposed in 1987, the National Rifle Association (NRA) mobilized to defeat the legislation, spending millions of dollars in the process. While the bill eventually did pass in both chambers of the United States Congress, the NRA was able to win an important concession: the final version of the legislation provided that, in 1998, the five-day waiting period for handgun sales would be replaced by an instant computerized background check that involved no waiting periods.

The NRA then funded lawsuits in Arizona, Louisiana, Mississippi, Montana, New Mexico, North Carolina, Texas, Vermont and Wyoming that sought to strike down the Brady Act as unconstitutional. These cases wound their way through the courts, eventually leading the U.S. Supreme Court to review the Brady Act in the case of Printz v. United States.

In Printz, the NRA argued that the Brady Act was unconstitutional because its provisions requiring local law enforcement officers to conduct background checks was a violation of the 10th Amendment to the Constitution (Brief Amicus Curiae of the National Rifle Association of America in Support of Petitioners, Printz v. United States, 521 U.S. 898, 1997).

In its 1997 decision in the case, the Supreme Court ruled that the provision of the Brady Act that compelled state and local law enforcement officials to perform the background checks was unconstitutional on 10th amendment grounds. The Court determined that this provision violated both the concept of federalism and that of the unitary executive. However, the overall Brady statute was upheld and state and local law enforcement officials remained free to conduct background checks if they so chose. The vast majority continued to do so. In 1998, background checks for firearm purchases became mostly a federally run activity when NICS came online, although many states continue to mandate state run background checks before a gun dealer may transfer a firearm to a buyer.

Background checks for firearms purchases operate in only one direction because of the Firearm Owners Protection Act. That is, although a firearms dealer may obtain electronic information that an individual is excluded from firearms purchases, the FBI and the Bureau of Alcohol, Tobacco, Firearms, and Explosives (ATF) do not receive electronic information in return to indicate what firearms are being purchased.

== Since 1998 ==
From the inception of the NICS system in 1998 through 2014, more than 202 million Brady background checks have been conducted. During this period approximately 1.2 million attempted firearm purchases were blocked by the Brady background check system, or about 0.6 percent. The most common reason for denials are previous felony convictions.

Prosecution and conviction of violators of the Brady Act, however, is extremely rare. During the first 17 months of the Act, only seven individuals were convicted. In the first year of the Act, 250 cases were referred for prosecution and 217 of them were rejected.

A 2000 study in the Journal of the American Medical Association (JAMA) found that the implementation of the Brady Act was associated with "reductions in the firearm suicide rate for persons aged 55 years or older." While the same study was unable to conclusively demonstrate the Brady Act had an effect on other gun-related deaths, later studies found waiting periods for handguns significantly reduce overall gun deaths. Georgetown University professor Jens Ludwig and Duke University professor Philip J. Cook, who conducted the JAMA study, praised the law. However, they also pointed out that it did not regulate a "secondary market" which involved acquiring guns from non-dealers, stating that "Our own view is that the Brady Act was a useful—but modest—first step, reducing the availability of guns to high-risk groups such as teens and convicted felons. The Brady Act's apparent effect in reducing gun suicides is encouraging, and implies that lives were probably saved as a result of the waiting period that was required during the first four years of the legislation. But effective action to reduce gun crime may require extending the regulatory umbrella to include the secondary market." Despite allegations that firearm-related homicides did not greatly decrease by 2000, nationwide data collected by the U.S. Department of Justice showed otherwise, with firearm related homicides dropping from 17,527 in 1994 to 10,801 in 2000. However, other factors played a role as well, as non-gun-related violence declined throughout the period. Researchers continue to debate how much of the decline in violent crime can be attributed to the Brady Act or other gun control legislation.

== See also ==
- Federal Assault Weapons Ban
- Gun law in the United States
- Gun politics in the United States
