= Abramski v. United States =

- Supreme Court of the United States

Argued January 22, 2014 Decided June 16, 2014
- Full case name: Bruce James Abramski, Jr., Petitioner v. United States
- Docket no.: 12-1493
- Citations: 573 U.S. 169 (more) 134 S. Ct. 2259; 189 L. Ed. 2d 262
- Opinion announcement: Opinion announcement

Case history
- Prior: Second motion to dismiss denied. United States v. Abramski, 778 F. Supp. 2d 678 (W.D. Va. 2011).; Conviction affirmed. 706 F.3d 307 (4th Cir. 2013).; Cert. granted sub nom Abramski v. United States. 571 U.S. 951 (2013).

Questions presented
- 1. Is a gun buyer's intent to sell a firearm to another lawful buyer in the future a fact "material to the lawfulness of the sale" of the firearm under 18 U.S.C. § 922(a)(6)?; 2. Is a gun buyer's intent to sell a firearm to another lawful buyer in the future a piece of information "required ... to be kept" by a federally licensed firearm dealer under § 924(a)(I)(A)?

Holding
- A person who buys a gun on someone else's behalf while falsely claiming that it is for himself makes a material misrepresentation that violates federal law because it concerns "information required by [Chapter 44 of Title 18 of the United States Code] to be kept" in the dealer's records.

Court membership
- Chief Justice John Roberts Associate Justices Antonin Scalia · Anthony Kennedy; Clarence Thomas · Ruth Bader Ginsburg; Stephen Breyer · Samuel Alito; Sonia Sotomayor · Elena Kagan

Case opinions
- Majority: Kagan, joined by Kennedy, Ginsburg, Breyer, Sotomayor
- Dissent: Scalia, joined by Roberts, Thomas, Alito

Laws applied
- 18 U.S.C. §§ 922(a)(6); 924(a)(1)(A)

Abramski v. United States, 573 U.S. 169 (2014), was a United States Supreme Court case in which the Court found that making arrangements for a straw purchase of a gun is in violation of the Gun Control Act of 1968, and is different from re-selling or gifting a previously purchased gun. In the Abramski case, a former police officer from Virginia took advantage of a local discount to buy a gun for his uncle and later transferred it to Pennsylvania—the uncle's residence—using the appropriate federal procedure. During the purchase, Abramski falsely declared that he was purchasing the gun for himself.

Initially, Abramski's defense was that (a) the misrepresentation was not material since his uncle was legally capable of making the purchase himself, and (b) since the answer to the question of whether he was purchasing the gun for himself was not required to be kept on the firearms dealer's record, no law was violated. However, when the case came before the Supreme Court, Abramski modified his defense and claimed that the misrepresentation was not material because the law only cares about the person buying the gun from the dealer, not the final receiver of the gun. The Court disagreed with this interpretation and held that the law cared about the final receiver, which is properly considered the person buying the gun. Such straw arrangements, the Court held, are different from allowed transfers where a person buys a gun for himself and later decides to sell it. Accordingly, the Court found that the misrepresentation was material. Additionally, the Court found that the answer was required to be kept on the dealer's record. The Court thus held that the purchase violated 18 U.S.C. § 922(a)(6), which makes it unlawful to falsify facts "material to the lawfulness of the sale," and 18 U.S.C. § 924(a)(1)(A), which prohibits misrepresentation with respect to information which a dealer is required to maintain on record. In a dissenting opinion, Justice Antonin Scalia argued that the declaration about the ultimate recipient of the gun was not material to the sale, and that it is not included in the information that the dealer is required to keep on the records. After the ruling, proponents of gun control stated that the Court's decision will help keep guns out of the hands of dangerous people, while opponents of gun control stated that the ruling is a "horrible injustice".

== Background ==
=== Statutory background ===
The Gun Control Act of 1968 regulates the sale and transfer of guns. Section 922(a)(6) of the act makes it unlawful for any person acquiring a gun from a gun dealer to "knowingly ... make any false or fictitious ... written statement ... likely to deceive" the dealer, "with respect to any fact material to the lawfulness of the sale." Section 924(a)(1)(A) of the same act, makes it unlawful and provides a penalty for anyone who "knowingly makes any false statement or representation with respect to the information required by this chapter to be kept in the records of a firearms dealer under this chapter." These provisions of the Act only apply to purchasers in the "primary market," that is purchasers buying guns from gun dealers. The provisions do not apply to the "secondary market," that is second hand guns sold or gifted by a private party.

=== Factual background ===
Bruce Abramski, a former Roanoke, Virginia, police officer, offered to buy his uncle, Angel "Danny" Alvarez, a resident of Pennsylvania, a Glock 19 handgun at a police discount. Agreeing, Alvarez sent Abramski a check, for $400, which stated "Glock 19 handgun" in the memo line. Abramski proceeded to purchase the gun, and filled the required ATF Form 4473. Question 11.a. on the form asks: "Are you the actual transferee/buyer of the firearm(s) listed on this form? Warning: You are not the actual buyer if you are acquiring the firearm(s) on behalf of another person. If you are not the actual buyer, the dealer cannot transfer the firearm(s) to you." Abramski's answer to this question was yes. After passing the background checks, and receiving the gun, Abramski contacted a federally licensed firearms dealer (FFL) in Pennsylvania, which conducted its own background check on Alvarez and then proceeded to transfer the gun to Alvarez through the FFL. Completing the transaction, Abramski deposited the check and received a receipt from Alvarez. Later, Abramski was suspected of committing a bank robbery, and his house was searched by Federal agents who found the receipt.

=== Procedural history ===
After being indicted by a grand jury, Abramski moved to dismiss the indictment. Abramski claimed that: (1), his misrepresentation on Question 11.a. was not "material to the lawfulness of the sale," under § 922(a)(6), since Alvarez was able to lawfully purchase the gun; and (2), since the answer to Question 11.a. is not "required ... to be kept in the records" of the gun dealer, the false statement is not in violation of §924(a)(1)(A). The District Court denied both motions, and Abramski entered a conditional guilty plea, where he reserved the right to challenge the sentence. Abramski was then sentenced to five years of probation on every count. The United States Court of Appeals for the Fourth Circuit affirmed the District Court's conviction.

=== Supreme Court ===
The Supreme Court noted that the Fifth Circuit agreed with Abramski's claim that falsifying the answer to Question 11.a is not considered material, if the true-buyer can legally buy and possess the gun. The Supreme Court granted certiorari to resolve a split between the circuit courts, even though Abramski's defense had changed, and he now claimed that the answer to Question 11.a is never material. Various parties filed amicus briefs supporting either side. Parties supporting Abramski included the National Rifle Association Civil Rights Defense Fund, and West Virginia and 25 other states, while others, like the Brady Center to Prevent Gun Violence, and Hawaii and 8 other states (plus the District of Columbia), filed amicus briefs supporting Abramski's conviction.

== Opinion of the Court ==
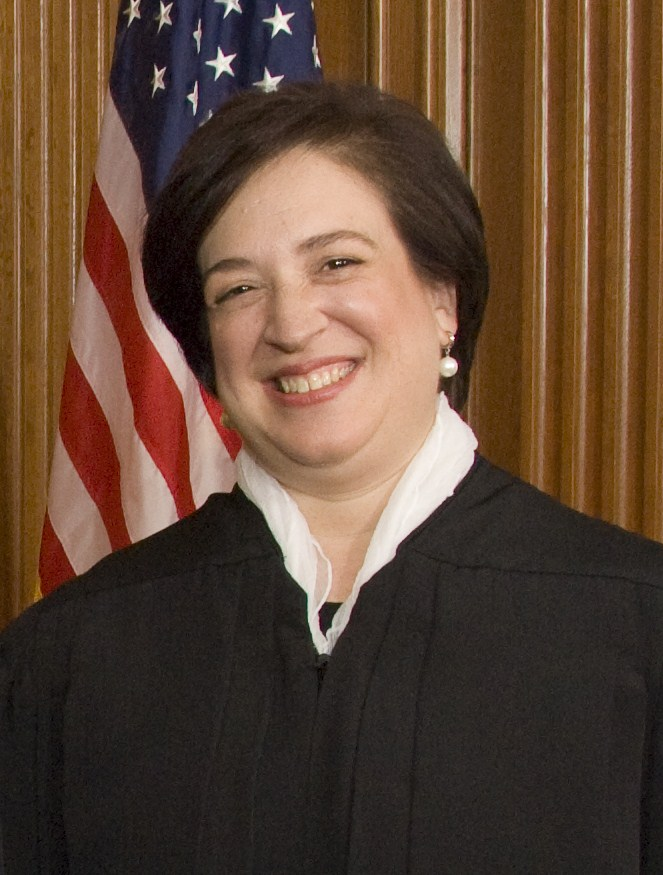
Justice Elena Kagan, author of the majority opinion

The Court held that despite not mentioning the words "straw buyers", the federal gun law that regulates transactions with "persons" or "transferees" considers the "persons" or "transferees" to be the ones getting the gun at the end of the day, not the straw persons completing the transaction on their behalf. Failure to interpret the law in such way, the Court held, would undermine the purpose of the law, which is to prevent guns from falling into the wrong hands. "Deliverymen, after all, are not so hard to come by." The majority found Abramski's theory, that the federal law only cares about the person that is buying the gun and not the final buyer not to be true. The Court's majority opinion, written by Justice Kagan, held that if you interpret the terms "person" and "transferee," to mean "the man at the counter", you would undermine the purpose of the statutes, which is to prevent guns from falling into the wrong hands. The Court therefore preferred to interpret the terms "person," and "transferee," to mean "the man getting, and always meant to get, the firearm".

The Court further stated that although congress allowed the resale and gifting of a gun by an individual, without requiring form or background checks, that is not proof that congress did not care about straw buyers. "Yes, Congress decided to regulate dealers' sales, while leaving the secondary market for guns largely untouched ... And yes, that choice (like pretty much everything Congress does) was surely a result of compromise. But no, straw arrangements are not a part of the secondary market, separate and apart from the dealer's sale." The Court also rejected Abramski's claim that since Alvarez was able to buy the gun legally on his own the misrepresentation is not material, stating: "Abramski's false statement was material because had he revealed that he was purchasing the gun on Alvarez's behalf, the sale could not have proceeded under the law—even though Alvarez turned out to be an eligible gun owner. The sale, as an initial matter, would not have complied with §922(c)'s restrictions on absentee purchases." The court held that Abramski's case is analogous to a situation where a person that can buy a gun legally buys a gun under an alias. Such misrepresentation is material regardless of the fact that the buyer may purchase a gun legally, and the theory of "no harm, no foul" should not apply. Finally, the Court rejected Abramski's claim that the misrepresentation is not in violation of §924, because it is not part of what the dealer is statutorily required to maintain on his record. The Court held that §924 requires the dealer to maintain information "required by this chapter", and that ATF Form 4473 is required by this chapter.

Accordingly, the Supreme Court affirmed the decision of the Fourth Circuit against Abramski.

== Dissent ==
Dissenting, Justice Scalia would have held that although Abramski made a false statement by claiming that he was the buyer/transferee, since Alvarez was lawfully able to buy the gun, the statement is not "with respect to any fact material to the lawfulness of the sale," which is the requirement in §922(a)(6). Additionally, the dissent criticized the government's use of the "agency law" principle to determine that Abramski was a third party's common-law agent for Alvarez. Instead, the dissent believed that common English should be used to interpret statutes, and therefore, under the statute, Abramski was the "person" buying the gun, not Alvarez. Furthermore, the dissent did not think that the statute is "rendered meaningless" simply because one can buy a gun on behalf of another, just like it is not rendered meaningless when one gifts a gun. The dissent also wondered why the majority would not agree that this is yet another loophole to a statute that has so many loopholes, and argued that perhaps it was Congress' intent to only limit the actual person at the counter. The dissent also stated that even if the majority had the proper interpretation of the statute, the ambiguity should be resolved in favor of lenity. Regarding the Section 924 charges, the dissent explained that the statute clearly lists what the dealer is required to maintain on record, and that the answer to the question of whether he is the actual buyer is not on the list. The dissent stated that the majority's interpretation ultimately carried the text too far. "[I]f the bureaucrats responsible for creating Form 4473 decided to ask about the buyer's favorite color, a false response would be a federal crime." Justice Scalia concluded with the statement:

The Court makes it a federal crime for one lawful gun owner to buy a gun for another lawful gun owner. Whether or not that is a sensible result, the statutes Congress enacted do not support it—especially when, as is appropriate, we resolve ambiguity in those statutes in favor of the accused. I respectfully dissent.

== Responses and analysis ==
Although not considered a "ground breaking rule" by some law reviewers, the case received responses from both proponents and opponents of gun control. The Brady Center to Prevent Gun Violence, which was the only gun prevention group to file an amicus brief hailed the Court's decision as a victory over the "corporate gun lobby." Dan Gross, the president of the Brady Center to Prevent Gun Violence, stated that the decision "will save lives by keeping guns out of the hands of dangerous people," and that "the Supreme Court rejected efforts by the corporate gun lobby to undermine federal gun laws, reaffirming that sensible laws can have a big impact while being consistent with the Second Amendment." Adam Winkler, writing for New Republic, also supported the ruling, stating that it is a "relief to law enforcement." However, others, like the National Rifle Association (NRA), criticized the ruling, stating that it "seemingly allows the government to require virtually any information it wants from a person buying a firearm from a federally licensed dealer, whether or not that information has any relationship to public safety or the policies of federal law." John Lott, a gun rights advocate, criticized the Court's statement that collecting this "information helps to fight serious crime," claiming that registration doesn't help solve crimes, since registered guns are rarely left at the scene. He noted, for example, that Hawaii's requirement to register guns has not solved a single crime in 50 years, though Lott cited no evidence to support his claim. According to Lott, the Court "confirmed a horrible injustice, with no understanding of how gun tracing works, and without producing any increased safety for Americans." A Harvard Law Review case note contended that, as a matter of law, the word "person" was properly interpreted by the majority, thus avoiding "gutting key provisions of the statute," and argued, against the dissent, that the majority's interpretation is also consistent with common English. However, the case note argued that a narrower reading of the second count was more appropriate, because the statute explicitly requires the name age and residence, and not anything else. Thus, the law review concluded, the Supreme Court established an unnecessary precedent.

== See also ==
- Firearm case law in the United States
- Gun law in the United States
