= Universal background check =

Background checks for private sales of firearms in the United States

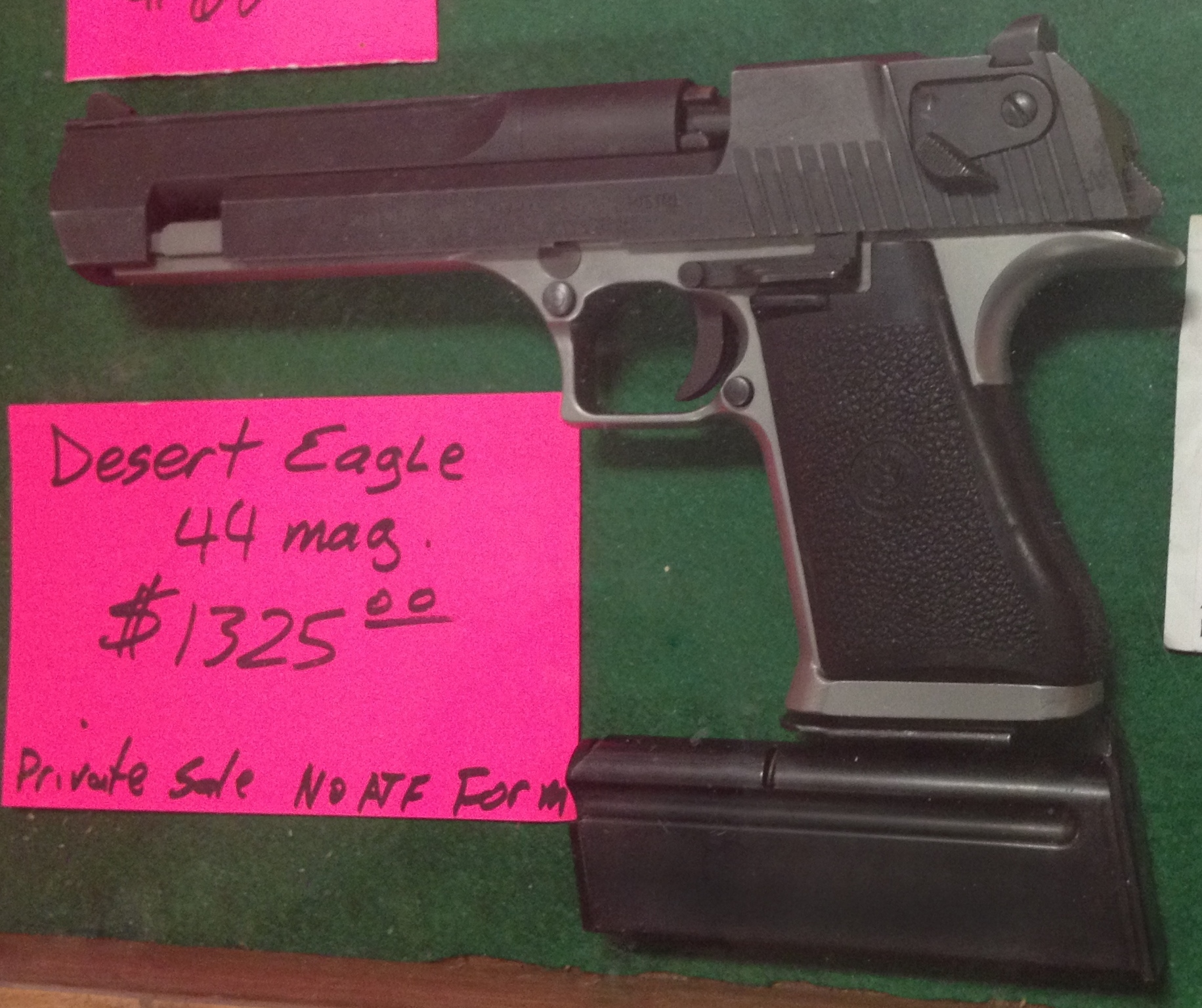
Desert Eagle .44 Magnum, private sale

A universal background check for guns is a policy that requires a background check for all gun sales or transfers, regardless of where they occur or who is involved. This includes sales at gun shows, private sales between individuals, and sales made online. The idea is to close loopholes in existing laws that currently allow some gun purchases to occur without background checks.

Proposals in the United States, as part of gun control efforts, would require all gun sales or transfers to be recorded and go through the National Instant Criminal Background Check System (NICS), closing what is sometimes called the private sale exemption. Universal background checks are not required by U.S. federal gun law, but at least 22 states and the District of Columbia currently require background checks for certain private sales of firearms.

== Background ==
Federal gun law requires background checks (through the National Instant Criminal Background Check System or NICS) only for guns sold through licensed firearm dealers, which account for 78% of all gun sales in the United States. This figure was published in a 2017 study by the Annals of Internal Medicine which, using a 2015 survey, found that 22% of recent gun transfers (purchased and nonpurchased) were completed without a background check. The authors noted that while this number was less than in years past, it nonetheless indicates that millions of U.S. adults are able to obtain firearms without background checks. The current federal law allows people not "engaged in the business" of selling firearms to sell firearms without a license or records. A 2008 report from the Coalition to Stop Gun Violence (CSGV) stated that the NICS had prevented over 1.4 million felons and other prohibited persons from purchasing firearms in the years between 1994 and 2005. According to the CSGV, the law also has a prohibitive effect, that deters illegal purchases.

In November 1998, President Bill Clinton directed the U.S. Secretary of the Treasury and the U.S. Attorney General (A.G.) to provide recommendations concerning the fact that 25% or more of sellers at gun shows in the U.S. are not required to run background checks on potential buyers. This was called the gun show loophole. Two months later, Gun Shows: Brady Checks and Crime Gun Traces was released. The Secretary and the A.G. made seven recommendations, including expanding the definition of "gun show," and reviewing the definition of "engaged in the business".

After the Columbine High School massacre in April 1999, gun shows and background checks became a focus of national debate. In May, the executive vice president of the National Rifle Association of America (NRA) told the House Judiciary Subcommittee on Crime, "We think it is reasonable to provide mandatory, instant criminal background checks for every sale at every gun show." Those concerned about the shows believed they were a source of illegally trafficked firearms. (Note: A report released in 2009, 10 years after Columbine, discussed the role that gun shows play in trafficking to Mexico.) Efforts to reverse a key feature of the Firearm Owners Protection Act (FOPA) by requiring criminal background checks and purchase records on private sales at gun shows, which had become prolific in the U.S. since the law's passage in 1986, were unsuccessful.

== Private sale exemption ==
In the August 5, 2010, issue of The New England Journal of Medicine, researchers Garen J. Wintemute, Anthony A. Braga, and David M. Kennedy, wrote that gun shows account for only a fraction of all U.S. gun sales and that a more effective strategy of preventing gun violence would be to make all private-party gun sales go through the screening and record-keeping processes that Federal Firearms Licensed (FFL) dealers are required to do. Their report concluded:

Drawbacks with respect to expense and inconvenience notwithstanding, 83% of self-reported gun owners and 87% of the general population endorsed regulation for all private-party gun sales in a 2008 poll that was conducted for the advocacy organization Mayors Against Illegal Guns. Gun owners gave stronger support to this all-inclusive approach than to a gun-show-only proposal in a 2009 poll conducted for the same organization. Either proposal would face tough sledding on Capitol Hill. It would therefore seem preferable to move forward with the version that is most likely to reduce the rates of firearm-related violence.

Following the December 14, 2012 Sandy Hook Elementary School massacre, there were numerous calls for universal background checks to close what is now referred to as the "gun show loophole" or "private sale loophole." In an essay published in 2013, Wintemute said that comprehensive background checks that included private sales would result in a simple, fair framework for retail firearms commerce. In February 2014, researchers at the Johns Hopkins Center for Gun Policy and Research reported that after the 2007 repeal in Missouri of a long-standing law that required all handgun buyers to pass a background check there was a 23% increase in firearms homicides.

A 2012 study published in the journal Injury Prevention found that nearly 80% of all firearms used for criminal purposes are obtained through transfers from unlicensed dealers, which are not required to conduct background checks in a majority of states due to the private sale exemption. A 2016 survey of federal and state prison inmates by the Bureau of Justice Statistics found that among prisoners who possessed a gun during their offense, 10.1% obtained the gun through a retail source (7.5% gun shop/store, 1.6% pawn shop, 0.8% gun show, and 0.4% from a flea market); 25.3% obtained the gun from an individual (family member, friend, or other, whether purchased, traded, borrowed, or received as a gift); 43.2% obtained the gun off the street or through the underground market (such as "markets for stolen goods, middlemen for stolen goods, criminals or criminal enterprises" or people involved in the illegal drug trade); 6.4% obtained the gun through theft; and 17.4% obtained the gun from another source.

In 2017, a study by researchers from Northeastern University and the Harvard School of Public Health showed that 22% of U.S. gun owners who had obtained a gun in the previous two years did not undergo a background check before doing so.

== Public opinion ==
Universal background checks for guns enjoy high levels of public support; a 2016 representative survey found 86% of registered voters in the U.S. supported the measure. Five national polls conducted in 2015 show high levels of support for "expanded background checks for gun purchases," with rates varying (93% and 89% support in two Quinnipiac University surveys, 92% support in a CBS/New York Times survey, 86% support in a Gallup survey, 85% support in a Pew Research Center survey). A 2015 survey found that more than 90% of Americans supported universal background checks, and that, on average, Americans thought they would be more effective than any other gun policy. There is evidence that many Americans incorrectly think that universal background checks are required by federal law; a 2016 survey found that 41% of Americans believed this to be the case. The same survey found that 77% of Americans supported universal background checks, while only 53% supported stricter gun laws. Based on this data, the authors concluded that "this difference might be attributable to poor awareness of the limitations of existing laws."

In 2015, large majorities of American adults, both Republicans (79%) and Democrats (88%), supported background checks for private sales and at gun shows, according to a Pew Research Center survey. In 2017, strong majorities of American adults, both gun owners (77%) and non-gun owners (87%), supported background checks for private sales and at gun shows, according to a Pew Research Center survey with an error attributable to sampling of +/- 2.8% at the 95% level of confidence. In 2018, after the Stoneman Douglas High School shooting in Parkland, Florida, nearly all Americans supported universal background checks. 88% of registered voters supported universal background checks, according to a Politico/Morning Consult poll with a margin of error +/- 2%. 94% of American voters supported universal background checks, according to a Quinnipiac University Polling Institute poll with a margin of error of +/- 3.4%.

A July 2019 poll by NPR found that 89% of respondents supported background checks for all gun purchases at gun shows or other private sales. An overwhelming majority of Republicans (84%) and Democrats (96%) indicated their support, suggesting there is bipartisan popular consensus on the broad topic in the public.

== Criticism ==
Gun rights groups such as the National Rifle Association of America (NRA) and National Shooting Sports Foundation oppose universal background check proposals. Opponents of universal background checks argue that existing gun laws are sufficient; that the government does not prosecute enough of the attempted ineligible buyers who are turned away by the current system; that background checks are an invasion of privacy; and that "transfer" might be defined too broadly. Opponents also maintain that universal background checks would not stop crime and assert that the only way to properly enforce a universal system would be to require a registration database, which, if implemented by the federal government, is prohibited under 18 U.S.C. § 926(a) from the Firearm Owners Protection Act. Gun-rights advocate and author John Lott argues that universal background checks prevent poorer Americans from acquiring guns. Lott said that, as of December 2015, background checks added an effective cost of $80 (New York), $60 (Washington state), or $200 (Washington, D.C.) to transferring a firearm. Lott argues that universal background checks are an effective tax on guns and can prevent less affluent Americans from purchasing them, and that this disproportionately affects poor minorities who live in high-crime urban areas.

Some local counties have adopted Second Amendment sanctuary resolutions in opposition to universal background check laws.

A Reason magazine article from March 2023 cited a series of studies conducted out of the United Kingdom that stated:

The evidence indicates that state laws requiring background checks for private sales, which in practice means they must be completed through federally licensed dealers, are widely flouted by gun owners who object to the added expense and inconvenience.

== Effectiveness ==
=== Studies ===
Violence Prevention Research Program (VPRP) found that comprehensive background check policies led to increased background checks in Delaware, but not in Colorado or Washington. Non-compliance with the policy may explain the lack of an increase in the latter two states. Universal background check laws were associated with a 14.9% reduction in overall homicides, according to a 2019 study by medical researchers including Michael Siegel of the Boston University School of Public Health and David Hemenway of the Harvard T.H. Chan School of Public Health published by the Journal of General Internal Medicine. The study authors wrote that "further research is necessary to determine whether these associations are causal ones".

An October 2018 study conducted by the VPRP at UC Davis and the Center for Gun Policy and Research at Johns Hopkins Bloomberg School of Public Health found no change in firearm homicide or suicide rates in the ten years following California's 1991 implementation of comprehensive background checks. The study's control group used firearm and non-firearm mortality data for 32 states that did not implement major firearm policies during the period from 1981 to 2000. In the study period, firearm suicide rates were 10.9% lower in California but a similar decrease in non-firearm suicide was also observed. The study found no net difference between firearm-related homicide rates before and during the study period. The study authors identified a number of possible reasons for the null finding, including inadequate reporting of criminal records or other disqualifying information to background-check databases (especially pre-2000); a failure by sellers to conduct the background check as required by law; and the small number of persons affected by the California law.

A study published in July 2018 found no association between firearm homicide and suicide rates and the repeal of comprehensive background check laws in two states. The study compared rates from synthetic control groups to rates in Indiana from 1981 to 2008 and in Tennessee from 1994 to 2008. Rates from the two states' study periods were within the range of natural variability. The study also concluded that in order to understand whether comprehensive background checks generally reduce firearm deaths, more evidence from other states is needed.

A study published in June 2018 in the Journal of Urban Health by authors affiliated with the VPRP at UC Davis and the Center for Gun Policy and Research at Johns Hopkins Bloomberg School of Public Health found comprehensive background check (CBC) laws not tied to a permit-to-purchase law were associated with an increase in firearm homicide rates but not non-firearm homicide rates. The authors of the study noted, however, that they have "identified no plausible theory to explain how requiring a prospective firearm purchaser to undergo a background check would result in increased homicide rates." In attempting to explain the unexpected results, the researchers proposed an endogenous relationship such that states passing the CBC-only laws were doing so in response to already rising firearm homicide rates.

A 2016 study published in The Lancet attempted to measure the impact that 25 different state laws had on overall firearm-related mortality, and it found that universal background checks had the strongest overall impact. Additionally, the researchers' projection of a federally implemented universal background check policy predicted that national firearm mortality could drop from 10.35 deaths per 100,000 people to 4.46 deaths per 100,000 people. A 2015 study published in the American Journal of Public Health found that a Connecticut law (enacted in 1995) requiring handgun buyers to undergo a background check (in order to obtain a required permit) "was associated with a 40 percent decline in gun homicides and a 15 percent drop in suicides" during the law's first ten years in effect. A 2014 study published in the Journal of Urban Health found that the 2007 repeal of a "permit-to-purchase" handgun law in Missouri (including the repeal of a background-check requirement) was associated with a 23% increase in the firearm homicide rate and a 15% increase in the murder rate, translating "to increases of between 55 and 63 homicides per year in Missouri." The study controlled for other variables that might affect homicides, including "changes in rates of unemployment, poverty, incarceration, burglary, law enforcement officers per capita, and the presence of four other types of state laws." A 2013 study published in the JAMA Internal Medicine analyzed various types of firearm legislation across the U.S. from 2007 to 2010 and firearm-related deaths across all 50 states, and concluded that stronger background checks were associated with lower overall firearm fatality rates.

=== Scholarly surveys ===
In a survey published by The New York Times in January 2017, a panel of 32 scholars of criminology, public health, and law rated universal background checks as the most effective policy to prevent gun deaths, ranking it #1 of 29 possible gun-related policies (7.3 on a 10-point effectiveness scale). In a subsequent expert survey published in October 2017 on policies to curb mass shooting deaths specifically, the expert panel ranked universal checks for gun buyers and universal checks for ammunition buyers as 6.6 and 6.5 (on a 10-point effectiveness scale), respectively, ranking them as the fifth- and sixth-most effective of 20 gun-policy proposals.

A survey by Arthur Berg, Gary Mauser, and John Lott, published in the winter 2019–2020 edition of the Cato Institute quarterly Regulation, asked respondents (38 criminologists, 32 economists, and 50 public health researchers who had published an empirical study on firearms in a peer-reviewed journal) to rank the effects of 33 firearms policies (20 policies in the New York Times in 2017, plus 8 additional policies that would loosen gun regulation, and 5 additional restrictive policies) on reducing murder rates and mass shootings. (Berg, Mauser, and Lott asked about "murder rates" rather than gun homicides because they made the assumption that stricter gun laws would not affect the homicide rate.) Respondents ranked universal background checks 13th and 14th for reducing the murder rate and reducing mass shootings, respectively. Public health researchers were substantially likelier than economists and criminologists to rate universal background checks as effective.

== Implications for mental health counseling ==
Universal background check laws, which require a background check before any firearm transfer, may extend to temporary removals of firearms from the homes of individuals at risk of suicide. Some clinicians have noted that these laws can create uncertainty regarding the legality of such transfers, potentially complicating their ability to effectively counsel patients on firearm safety in these situations.

== States with universal background check laws ==
As of 2024, 22 states and the District of Columbia require background checks for at least some private sales of firearms; of these, 19 states and the District of Columbia require background checks for all gun sales.

Jurisdiction	Summary from Giffords Law Center
California, Colorado, Connecticut, Delaware, Illinois, Maryland, Nevada, New Jersey, New Mexico, New York, Oregon, Rhode Island, Vermont, Virginia, Washington, and the District of Columbia	"Generally require universal background checks at the point of sale for all sales of all classes of firearms, whether they are purchased from a licensed dealer or an unlicensed seller." New Mexico and Virginia law includes an exemption for "transfers that are not made for a fee or other remuneration."
Hawaii, Illinois, Massachusetts, Michigan and Oregon	"Require all firearm purchasers to obtain a permit, issued after a background check, in order to buy any firearm", in lieu of a point-of-sale background check.
New Jersey and Oregon	"Requires firearm purchasers to both obtain a permit to purchase a firearm and, if the purchase is from an unlicensed seller, conduct the transaction through a federally-licensed firearms dealer."
Minnesota and Nebraska	"Permit and background check requirement for handgun purchases but not long-gun purchases."
Maine	"Requires background checks on sales by private sellers if those sales are at gun shows or the guns were advertised for sale."
