= Federal Firearms Act of 1938 =

1938 United States firearms legislation

- Long title: An Act to regulate commerce in firearms.
- Acronyms (colloquial): FFA
- Nicknames: Federal Firearms Act
- Enacted by: the 75th United States Congress
- Effective: June 30, 1938

Citations
- Public law: Pub. L. 75–785
- Statutes at Large: 52 Stat. 1250

Legislative history
- Introduced in the Senate as S. 3; Signed into law by President Franklin D. Roosevelt on June 30, 1938

The Federal Firearms Act of 1938 (FFA) imposed a federal license requirement on gun manufacturers, importers, and persons in the business of selling firearms. The term federal firearms licensee (FFL) is used to refer to those on whom the license requirement is imposed. The "FFL" abbreviation is also used to refer to the license itself.

In addition to the licensing component of the FFA, the law required licensees to maintain customer records, and it made illegal the transfer of firearms to certain classes of persons, such as convicted felons. These classes of persons are commonly referred to as "prohibited persons". The circumstances resulting in the prohibition (such as a felony conviction) are often referred to as "disabilities". The FFA was repealed by the Gun Control Act of 1968 (GCA), though many of its provisions were reenacted as part of the GCA, which revised the FFA and its predecessor, the National Firearms Act of 1934 (NFA).

The FFA was enforced by the Alcohol Tax Unit, one of the precursors of the Bureau of Alcohol, Tobacco, Firearms and Explosives.

== See also ==
- Firearm Owners Protection Act, a 1986 law that significantly amended the GCA and eased many of the restrictions on firearms sellers
- Gun law in the United States
