= Form 3310.4 =

ATF Form 3310.4, May 2012 revision

Report of Multiple Sale or Other Disposition of Pistols and Revolvers, or ATF Form 3310.4, is a form prescribed by the Bureau of Alcohol, Tobacco, Firearms, and Explosives (ATF) for use by firearm dealers holding a Federal Firearms License (FFL) to report when an unlicensed person purchases or acquires two or more handguns at one time or during five consecutive business days.

The form must be completed in triplicate (3 copies): the original is sent to ATF's National Tracing Center by fax or mail; a copy is sent to the designated State police or the local law enforcement agency in the jurisdiction where the sale took place; and the third copy is retained in the records of the dealer and held for not less than 5 years.

The requirement to report multiple sales or other dispositions of pistols or revolvers has been in place since the Gun Control Act of 1968. ATF has stated that these reports of multiple sales are a valuable tool when investigating gun trafficking.

== Form 3310.12 ==
After a rule promulgated under the Obama administration in the wake of the ATF gunwalking scandal in 2011, FFL holders in states bordering Mexico — Arizona, California, New Mexico, and Texas — have also been required to report multiple sales of semi-automatic rifles with a caliber greater than .22 that are capable of accepting a detachable magazine on a Form 3310.12.
