= Gun law in the United States =

In the United States, the right to keep and bear arms is modulated by a variety of state and federal statutes. These laws generally regulate the manufacture, trade, possession, transfer, record keeping, transport, use, and destruction of firearms, ammunition, and firearms accessories. They are enforced by state, local and the federal agencies which include the Bureau of Alcohol, Tobacco, Firearms and Explosives (ATF).

The private right to keep and bear arms is protected by the Second Amendment of the United States Constitution. This protection became legally explicit when the U.S. Supreme Court ruled in District of Columbia v. Heller (2008) that the Amendment defined and protected an individual right, unconnected with militia service. A subsequent holding in McDonald v. City of Chicago (2010) ruled that the Second Amendment is incorporated by the Due Process Clause of the Fourteenth Amendment and thereby applies to state and local laws. In New York State Rifle & Pistol Association, Inc. v. Bruen (2022) the Court struck down New York's may-issue policy of being required to show "proper cause" to be granted a concealed carry license, but allowed states to enforce "shall-issue" permitting where applicants must satisfy certain objective criteria such as passing a background check. It also held that any regulation of firearms in the United States is presumed unconstitutional unless the state can prove it is rooted in the country's text, history, and tradition. In United States v. Rahimi (2024), this test was refined as the Court upheld federal laws restricting gun rights from those accused of domestic violence and said that lower courts should not seek exact comparisons when reviewing the historical tradition but rather look at similar analogues and general principles.

== Major federal gun laws ==
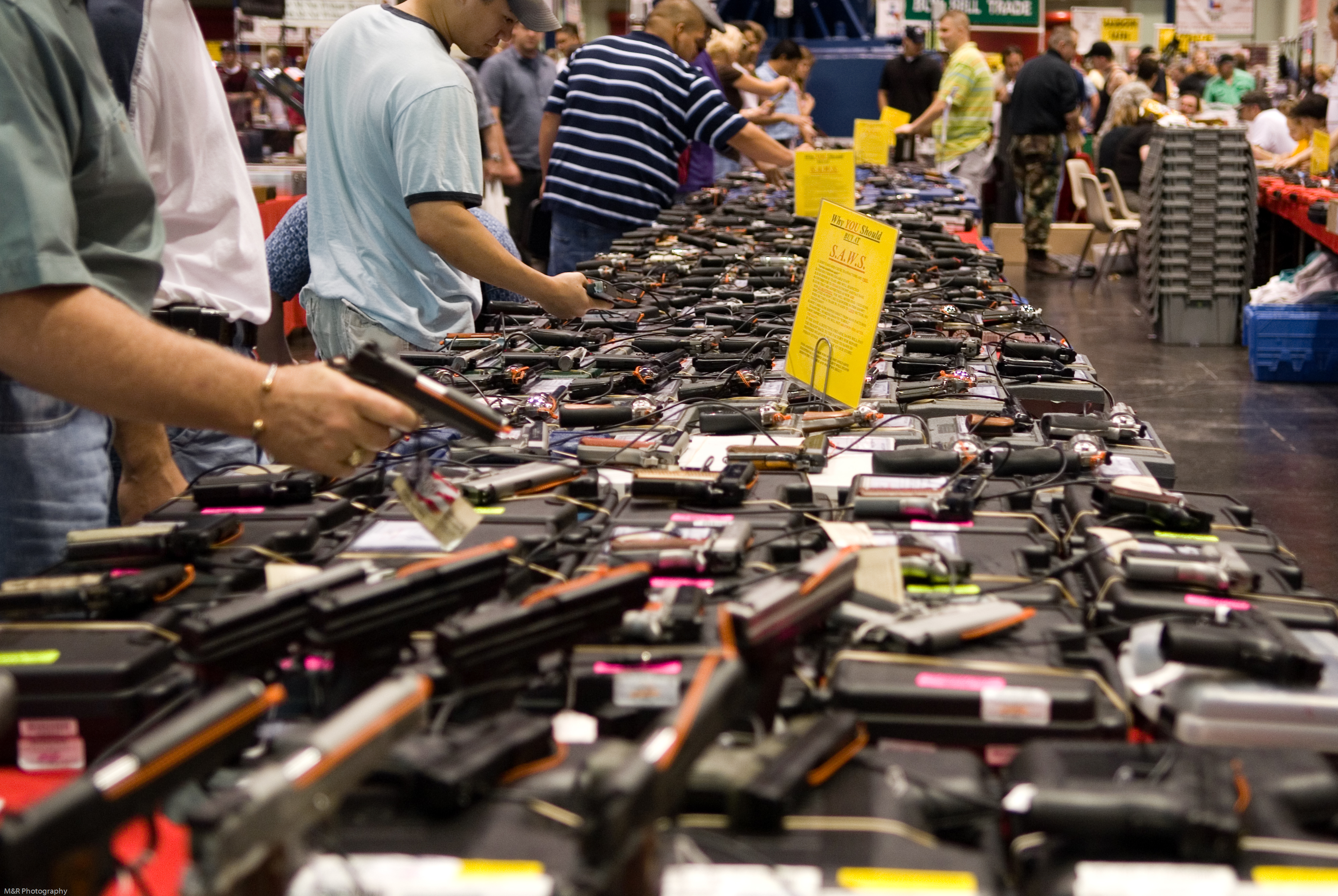
Handguns for sale at a gun show in the U.S.

Most federal gun laws are found in the following acts:

- National Firearms Act (NFA) (1934): Taxes the manufacture and transfer of, and mandates the registration of Title II weapons such as machine guns, short-barreled rifles and shotguns, heavy weapons, explosive ordnance, suppressors, and disguised or improvised firearms.
- Federal Firearms Act of 1938 (FFA): Requires that gun manufacturers, importers, and those in the business of selling firearms have a federal firearms license (FFL). Prohibits the transfer of firearms to certain classes of people, such as convicted felons.
- Omnibus Crime Control and Safe Streets Act of 1968 (1968): Prohibited interstate trade in handguns, increased the minimum age to 21 for buying handguns.
- Gun Control Act of 1968 (GCA): Focuses primarily on regulating interstate commerce in firearms by generally prohibiting interstate firearms transfers except among licensed manufacturers, dealers and importers.
- Firearm Owners Protection Act (FOPA) (1986): Revised and partially repealed the Gun Control Act of 1968. Prohibited the sale to civilians of automatic firearms manufactured after the date of the law's passage. Required ATF approval of transfers of automatic firearms.
- Undetectable Firearms Act (1988): Effectively criminalizes, with a few exceptions, the manufacture, importation, sale, shipment, delivery, possession, transfer, or receipt of firearms with less than 3.7 oz of metal content.
- Gun-Free School Zones Act (1990): Prohibits unauthorized individuals from knowingly possessing a firearm at a place that the individual knows, or has reasonable cause to believe, is a school zone.
- Brady Handgun Violence Prevention Act (1993): Requires background checks on most firearm purchasers, depending on seller and venue.
- Federal Assault Weapons Ban (1994–2004): Banned semiautomatics that looked like assault weapons and large capacity ammunition feeding devices. The law expired in 2004.
- Law Enforcement Officers Safety Act (2004): Granted law enforcement officers and former law enforcement officers the right to carry a concealed firearm in any jurisdiction in the United States, regardless of state or local laws, with certain exceptions.
- Protection of Lawful Commerce in Arms Act (2005): Prevents firearms manufacturers and licensed dealers from being held liable for negligence if a crime is committed using their products.
- Bipartisan Safer Communities Act (2022): Expands background checks for purchasers under 21 to include their juvenile records, requires more sellers to have an FFL, funds state crisis intervention programs, further criminalizes arms trafficking and straw purchases, and mostly closes the “boyfriend loophole”.

=== Overview of current regulations ===
Fugitives, those convicted of a felony with a sentence exceeding one year, past or present, and those who were involuntarily admitted to a mental facility are prohibited from purchasing a firearm; unless rights restored. Forty-five states have a provision in their state constitutions similar to the Second Amendment to the United States Constitution, which protects the right to keep and bear arms. The exceptions are California, Maryland, Minnesota, New Jersey, and New York. In New York, however, the statutory civil rights laws contain a provision virtually identical to the Second Amendment. Additionally, the U.S. Supreme Court held in McDonald v. Chicago (2010) that the protections of the Second Amendment to keep and bear arms in one's home apply against state governments and their political subdivisions. In New York State Rifle & Pistol Association, Inc. v. Bruen, the Supreme Court ruled that states could not require "proper cause" or a "special need" when issuing a license for concealed carry.

== History ==
Important events regarding gun legislation occurred in the following years.

In 1791, the United States Bill of Rights were ratified, which included the Second Amendment to the United States Constitution which stated that "A well regulated Militia, being necessary to the security of a free State, the right of the people to keep and bear Arms, shall not be infringed."

In 1934, the National Firearms Act (NFA) was signed into law under President Franklin D. Roosevelt's Administration in an effort to curb prohibition-era violence. Between 1920 and 1933 the homicide rate in the United States had been rising year-over-year as an example of the unintended consequences of passing Prohibition into law, and the concomitant violence associated with making illegal a widely in-demand product. The NFA is considered to be the first federal legislation to enforce gun control in the United States, imposing a $200 tax, equivalent to approximately $3,942 in 2022, on the manufacture and transfer of Title II weapons. It also mandated the registration of machine guns, short-barreled rifles and shotguns, heavy weapons, explosive ordnance, suppressors, and disguised or improvised firearms. When Prohibition was ultimately repealed in 1933, and the monopoly on alcohol maintained by organized crime was ended, there was a significant decline in the homicide rate. In fact, "...homicides continued to diminish each year for eleven years straight [after the repeal of Prohibition]."

In 1938, President Franklin D. Roosevelt signed the Federal Firearms Act of 1938 (FFA) into law, requiring that all gun-related businesses must have a federal firearms license (FFL).

In 1939, through the court case United States v. Miller, the Supreme Court of the United States ruled that Congress could regulate interstate selling sawed-off shotguns through the National Firearms Act of 1934, deeming that such a weapon has no reasonable relationship with the efficiency of a well-regulated militia.

In 1968, following the spree of political assassinations including: the assassination of John F. Kennedy, the assassination of Robert F. Kennedy, and the assassination of Martin Luther King Jr, President Lyndon B. Johnson, pushed Congress for the Gun Control Act of 1968 (GCA). It repealed and replaced the FFA, regulated “destructive devices” (such as bombs, mines, grenades, and other explosives), expanded the definition of machine gun, required the serialization of manufactured or imported guns, banned importing military-style weapons, and imposed a 21 age minimum on the purchasing of handguns from FFLs. The GCA also prohibited the selling of firearms to felons and the mentally ill.

History of concealed carry laws

In 1986, contrary to prior gun legislation, the Firearm Owners Protection Act (FOPA) (1986), passed under the Ronald Reagan administration, enacted protections for gun owners. It prohibited a national registry of dealer records, limited ATF inspections to conduct annual inspections (unless multiple infractions have been observed), allowed licensed dealers to sell firearms at "gun shows" in their state, and loosened regulations on the sale and transfer of ammunition. However, the FOPA also prohibited civilian ownership or transfer of machine guns made after May 19, 1986, and redefined "silencer" to include silencer parts.

In 1993, the Brady Handgun Violence Prevention Act, named after a White House press secretary who was disabled during the attempted assassination of Ronald Reagan, was signed into law under the presidency of Bill Clinton. This act required that background checks must be conducted on gun purchases and established a criminal background check system maintained by the FBI.

In 1994, the Violent Crime Control and Law Enforcement Act was signed into law under the presidency of Bill Clinton, which included the Federal Assault Weapons Ban, effectively banned the manufacturing, selling, and possession of specific military-style assault weapons such as AR-15 style rifles and banned high-capacity ammunition magazines that held over 10 rounds. Banned arms that were previously legally possessed were grandfathered. The ban expired in September 2004.

In 2003, the Tiahrt Amendment proposed by Kansas Representative, Todd Tiahrt, limited the ATF to only release information from its firearms trace database to only law enforcement agencies or a prosecutors in connection with a criminal investigation.

In 2005, The Protection of Lawful Commerce in Arms Act was signed into law under the presidency of George W. Bush. This act protected gun manufacturers from being named in federal or state civil suits by those who were victims of crimes involving guns made by that company.

In 2008, the Supreme Court ruled in the case District of Columbia v. Heller that the Second Amendment is an "individual right to possess a firearm unconnected with service in a militia" and struck down Washington D.C.'s handgun ban. But the Supreme Court also stated "that the right to bear arms is not unlimited and that guns and gun ownership would continue to be regulated."

In 2010, the Supreme Court ruled in the case McDonald v. Chicago that the Second Amendment is incorporated and thus applies against the states.

In 2016, the Supreme Court ruled in the case Caetano v. Massachusetts that "the Second Amendment extends, prima facie, to all instruments that constitute bearable arms, even those that were not in existence at the time of the founding".

In 2022, the Supreme Court ruled in the case New York State Rifle & Pistol Association, Inc. v. Bruen "that the Second and Fourteenth Amendments protect an individual’s right to carry a handgun for self-defense outside the home" and that "the State’s may-issue licensing regime violates the Constitution."

== Second Amendment ==
States and counties that have passed Second Amendment sanctuary (or other pro-Second Amendment) laws or resolutions as of February 17, 2023. Localities within counties that have adopted such resolutions are not displayed in this map. County level State level Both state and county levels

The right to keep and bear arms in the United States is protected by the Second Amendment to the U.S. Constitution. While there have been contentious debates on the nature of this right, there was a lack of clear federal court rulings defining the right until the two landmark U.S. Supreme Court cases of District of Columbia v. Heller (2008) and McDonald v. City of Chicago (2010).

An individual right to own a gun for personal use was affirmed in Heller, which overturned a handgun ban in the federal District of Columbia. In the Heller decision, the court's majority opinion said that the Second Amendment protects "the right of law-abiding, responsible citizens to use arms in defense of hearth and home."

However, in delivering the majority opinion, Supreme Court Justice Antonin Scalia wrote on the Second Amendment not being an unlimited right:

Like most rights, the Second Amendment right is not unlimited. It is not a right to keep and carry any weapon whatsoever in any manner whatsoever and for whatever purpose: For example, concealed weapons prohibitions have been upheld under the Amendment or state analogues. The Court's opinion should not be taken to cast doubt on longstanding prohibitions on the possession of firearms by felons and the mentally ill, or laws forbidding the carrying of firearms in sensitive places such as schools and government buildings, or laws imposing conditions and qualifications on the commercial sale of arms.

The four dissenting justices argued that the majority had broken prior precedent on the Second Amendment, and took the position that the amendment refers to an individual right, but only in the context of militia service.

In McDonald, the Supreme Court ruled that, because of the incorporation of the Bill of Rights, the guarantee of an individual right to bear arms applies to state and local gun control laws and not just federal laws.

The Supreme Court ruled that the Second Amendment protects the right to carry guns in public for self-defense in New York State Rifle & Pistol Association, Inc. v. Bruen in 2022. Previously, federal appeals courts had issued conflicting rulings on this point. For example, the United States Court of Appeals for the Seventh Circuit ruled in 2012 that it does, saying, "The Supreme Court has decided that the amendment confers a right to bear arms for self-defense, which is as important outside the home as inside." However, the Tenth Circuit Court ruled in 2013 that it does not, saying, "In light of our nation's extensive practice of restricting citizen's freedom to carry firearms in a concealed manner, we hold that this activity does not fall within the scope of the Second Amendment's protections." More recently, the Ninth Circuit Court ruled in its 2016 decision Peruta v. San Diego County that the Second Amendment does not guarantee the right of gun owners to carry concealed firearms in public.

== Eligible people ==
Percent of households with guns in 2016. RAND Corporation.

U.S. gun sales have risen in the 21st century, peaking in 2020 during the COVID-19 pandemic. "NICS" is the FBI's National Instant Background Check System.

After the 2004 expiration of the Federal Assault Weapons Ban, the firearms industry embraced the AR-15's political and cultural significance for marketing. Almost every major gunmaker produces its own version, with ~16 million Americans owning at least one.

The following are eligible to possess and own firearms within the United States, though further restrictions apply:

- Citizens of the United States
- Non-citizen nationals of the United States
- Lawful permanent residents of the United States (also known as "green card" holders)
- Aliens (or foreign nationals) who have been lawfully admitted to the United States as refugees
- Aliens (or foreign nationals) who have been lawfully admitted to the United States under nonimmigrant visas but only if they fall under one of the following exceptions:
1. admitted into the United States for lawful hunting or sporting purposes
2. possesses a lawful hunting license or permit issued by any US state
3. an official representative of a foreign government who is accredited to the United States Government or the Government's mission to an international organization having its headquarters in the United States or is en route to or from another country to which that alien is accredited
4. an official of a foreign government or a distinguished foreign visitor who has been so designated by the Department of State
5. a foreign law enforcement officer of a friendly foreign government entering the United States on official law enforcement business
6. has received a waiver from the United States Attorney General, as long as the waiver petition shows this would be in the interests of justice and would not jeopardize the public safety under 18 U.S. Code § 922(y)(3)(c)
7. non-resident of any US state unless the receipt of firearms are for lawful sporting purposes

Under federal law, individuals must be 18+ years old to purchase a long gun and 21+ to purchase a handgun. Each state is legally permitted to raise the age requirement, but can not make it younger than the federal law.

Each state has its own laws regarding who is allowed to own or possess firearms, and there are various state and federal permitting and background check requirements. Controversy continues over which classes of people, such as convicted felons, people with severe or violent mental illness, and people on the federal no-fly list, should be excluded. Laws in these areas vary considerably, and enforcement is in flux.

== Prohibited persons ==
The Gun Control Act of 1968 prohibits certain classes of people from buying, selling, using, owning, receiving, shipping, carrying, possessing or exchanging any firearm or ammunition. Those prohibited include any individual who:

- has been convicted in any court of a "crime punishable by imprisonment for a term exceeding one year";
- is a fugitive from justice;
- is an unlawful user of or addicted to any controlled substance (as defined in section 102 of the Controlled Substances Act, codified at 21 U.S.C. § 802);
- has been adjudicated as a mental defective or has been involuntarily committed to any mental institution;
- is an illegal immigrant (i.e. any person who is unlawfully in the United States);
- has been lawfully admitted as an alien under a nonimmigrant visa and is not exempt under 18 U.S.C. § 922(y)(2);
- has been discharged from the Armed Forces under dishonorable conditions;
- has renounced his or her United States nationality (i.e., became a foreign national);
- is subject to a court order (including Domestic Violence Protective Orders as per USC Title 18 § 922(G)(8)) restraining the person from harassing, stalking, or threatening an intimate partner or child of the intimate partner; or
- has been convicted of a misdemeanor crime of domestic violence

These categories are listed on ATF Form 4473 – Firearms Transaction Record background check form. According to the US Sentencing Commission, approximately 5,000 to 6,000 prohibited persons are convicted of unlawfully receiving or possessing a firearm each year. In 2017, over 25.2 million background checks were performed.

== Manufacturers ==
Under United States law, any company which or gunsmith who in the course of their business manufactures firearms of finished frames and receivers, or modifies firearms for resale, must be licensed as a manufacturer of firearms.

== Shooting ranges ==
An estimated 16,000 to 18,000 indoor firing ranges are in operation across the United States.

=== Informal ranges ===
Recreational target shooting is generally allowed on public land administered by the Bureau of Land Management; much target shooting is unsupervised, outside the auspices of purpose-built or organised ranges. States may also allow shooting on state-administered public lands. "Dispersed recreational shooting" has resulted in a number of deaths from inappropriate and negligent practices such as attaching targets to trees and shooting without an appropriate backstop. It is usually illegal to shoot at trees on public land.

Concerns have been raised about criminal damage by target shooters to public lands, including the destruction of structures, vegetation and historic artefacts. Littering is also cited as a problem in some areas, including the abandonment of empty casings and debris from unapproved targets such as old televisions, household appliances and glass bottles.

Local restrictions are sometimes imposed on BLM-managed and state-owned public lands, particularly during wildfire season. Unmanaged target shooting can contribute to wildfires, with dispersed recreational shooting linked to 64 Utah wildfires in 2020. Calls have been made in some areas to construct more public-access ranges in conjunction with tougher restrictions on ad-hoc shooting on public land. US Congressman Blake Moore introduced the Range Access Act in 2022, which would have required each national forest and Bureau of Land Management district to provide at least one public recreational-shooting range.

== See also ==
- American gun ownership
- Concealed carry in the United States
- Firearm case law in the United States
- Gun culture in the United States
- Gun politics in the United States
- Hunting license
- Second Amendment sanctuary
- Index of gun politics articles
