= National Instant Criminal Background Check System =

US system for checking firearms purchasers

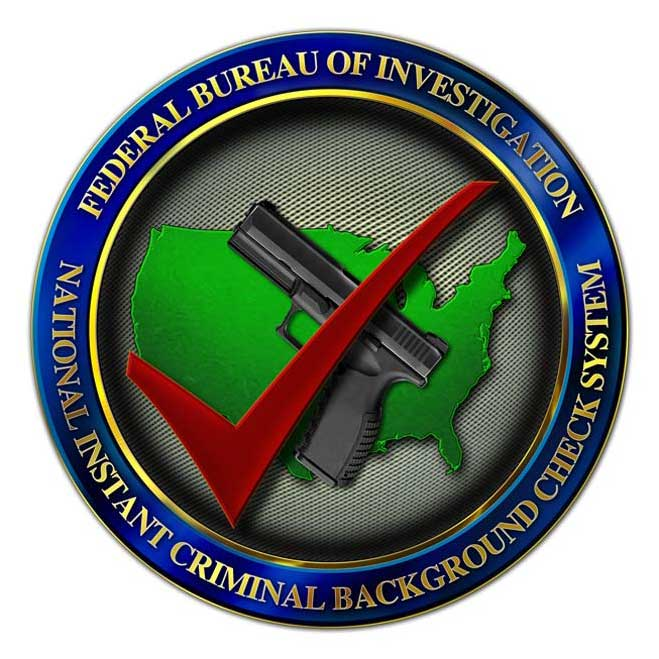
Emblem

The National Instant Criminal Background Check System (NICS) is a background check system in the United States created by the Brady Handgun Violence Prevention Act of 1993 to prevent firearm sales to people prohibited under the Act. The system was launched by the Federal Bureau of Investigation (FBI) in 1998. Under the system, firearm dealers, manufacturers or importers who hold a federal firearms license (FFL) are required to undertake a NICS background check on prospective buyers before transferring a firearm. The NICS is not intended to be a gun registry, but is a list of persons prohibited from owning or possessing a firearm. By law, upon successfully passing the background check, the buyer's details are to be discarded and a record on NICS of the firearm purchase is not to be made. However as an FFL holder, the seller is required to keep a record of the transaction.

Access to NICS is limited to FFL holders. A prospective buyer is required to complete ATF Form 4473, after which an FFL seller initiates a NICS background check by phone or computer. Most checks are determined within minutes and if a determination is not obtained within three business days, then the transfer may legally be completed.

While background checks under federal law are not required for intrastate firearm transfers between private parties through the gun show loophole or private sale loophole, federal law states that only FFL-holders may transport a firearm across state lines for the purpose of sale. Sales between two private parties may be conducted without a background check, so long as both the buyer and seller are residents of the state that the transfer is being conducted. Some states require background checks for firearm transfers not covered by the federal system. These states either require gun sales to be processed through an FFL holder, or they may require the buyer to obtain a license or permit from the state.

Over 26 million NICS background checks were performed in 2025.

== Background ==
Background checks of firearm buyers was discussed as early as the 1930s. The Gun Control Act of 1968 (GCA) mandated that individual and corporate firearms dealers hold a federal firearms license (FFL). It also created a system for keeping prohibited persons (e.g. a person determined to be prohibited of possessing a weapon due to criminal history or immigration status) from buying guns that relied upon buyers answering a series of "yes/no" questions such as, "Are you a fugitive from justice?". However, sellers, including FFL dealers, were not required to verify the answers.

Coordinated efforts to create a national background check system did not materialize until after the assassination attempt on President Ronald Reagan in March 1981. White House press secretary James Brady was seriously wounded in the attack, and afterward his wife, Sarah Brady, spearheaded the push to pass the Brady Handgun Violence Prevention Act in 1993. When signed into law in November of that year, the Brady Act included a GCA amendment that created the National Instant Criminal Background Check System (NICS).

The Brady Act mandated that FFL dealers run background checks on their buyers. At first, the law applied only to handgun sales, and there was a waiting period (maximum of five days) to accommodate dealers in states that did not already have background check systems in place. Those dealers were to use state law enforcement to run checks until 1998, when the NICS would become operational and come into effect. In 1997, the Supreme Court ruled against the five-day waiting period, but by 1998 the NICS was up and running, administered by the FBI, and applied to all firearms purchases from FFL dealers, including long guns.

== Functionality ==
A prospective buyer from a FFL dealer must complete and sign an ATF Form 4473—Firearms Transaction Record, and then the FFL dealer contacts the NICS by telephone or Internet for the background check. When the background check is initiated three databases are accessed: the National Crime Information Center (NCIC), the Interstate Identification Index (III), and the NICS Index. According to the FBI, checks are usually determined within minutes of initiation. If there is no match in any of the checked databases, the dealer is cleared to proceed with the transfer. Otherwise, the FBI's NICS Section must contact the appropriate judicial and/or law enforcement agencies for more information. Per the Brady Act, the FBI has three business days to make its decision to approve or deny the transfer. If the FFL dealer has not received the decision within that time it may legally proceed with the transaction. If the FBI later determines that the buyer is prohibited, it refers it to the Bureau of Alcohol, Tobacco, Firearms and Explosives (ATF) to retrieve the firearm.

In 2019, 261,312 federal background checks took longer than three business days. Of those, the FBI referred 2,989 to ATF for retrieval. The FBI stops researching a background check and purges most of the data from its systems at 88 days. This happened 207,421 times in 2019.

States may implement their own NICS programs. Such states become the point of contact (POC) between their FFL dealers and the NICS. A few partial-POC states run FFL handgun checks, while the FBI runs long gun checks. FFL dealers in other, non-POC states access the NICS directly through the FBI.

Authorized local, state, tribal and federal agencies can update NICS Index data via the NCIC front end, or by electronic batch files. In addition, the NICS Section receives calls, often in emergency situations, from mental health care providers, police departments, and family members requesting placement of individuals into the NICS Index. Documentation justifying entry into the NICS Index must be available to originating agencies.

The ATF has designated some states' firearm possession or carry permits/licenses as exempting that person from the NICS background check requirement since ownership of such permits/licenses require a background check.

== Prohibited persons ==
Under sections 922(g) and (n) of the Gun Control Act, certain persons are prohibited from:

- Shipping or transporting any firearm or ammunition in interstate commerce or foreign commerce;
- Receiving any firearm or ammunition that has been shipped or transported in interstate or foreign commerce.

A prohibited person is one who:

- Has been convicted in any court of a crime punishable by imprisonment for a term exceeding one year;
- Is under indictment for a crime punishable by imprisonment for a term exceeding one year;
- Is a fugitive from justice;
- who, being an alien—
  - (A) is illegally or unlawfully in the United States; or
  - (B) except as provided in subsection (y)(2), has been admitted to the United States under a nonimmigrant visa (as that term is defined in section 101(a)(26) of the Immigration and Nationality Act (8 U.S.C. 1101(a)(26))) (broadly, a visa issued for a defined temporary period to allow aliens living outside the US to visit, study, live, and/or work in the U.S.);
- Is an unlawful user of or addicted to any controlled substance;
- Has been adjudicated as a mental defective or committed (not admitted) to a mental institution;
- Has been discharged from the United States Armed Forces under dishonorable conditions;
- Having been a citizen of the United States, has renounced U.S. citizenship;
- Is subject to a court order that restrains the person from harassing, stalking, or threatening an intimate partner or child of such intimate partner;
- Has been convicted in any court of a "misdemeanor crime of domestic violence", a defined term in 18 U.S.C. 921(a)(33)

Prior to 2024, prohibited persons also included honorably discharged military Veterans who used a fiduciary to manage their VA benefits based on VA mandatory reporting.

== Firearm denial appeals ==
A buyer who believes that a NICS denial is erroneous may appeal the decision by either challenging the accuracy of the record used in the evaluation of the denial or claiming that the record used as basis for the denial is invalid or does not pertain to the buyer. The provisions for appeals are outlined in the NICS Regulations at Title 28, Code of Federal Regulations, Part 25.10, and Subsection 103 (f) and (g) and Section 104 of the Brady Handgun Violence Prevention Act of 1993.

According to the National Rifle Association, false positives in the NICS system deny citizens' Second Amendment rights. The NRA says that "there is significant reason to believe that the number of erroneous denials is far greater than those overturned on appeal" because some people may not appeal erroneous denials.

In an operations report in 2014 by the FBI, of a total of 90,895 "deny transactions", 4,411 (about 5%) were overturned after further research by the NICS section. According to the report, "The primary reason for the overturned deny decisions in 2014 was the appellant's fingerprints not matching the fingerprints of the subject of the firearms-disqualifying record. Another chief reason deny decisions are overturned on appeal pertain to criminal history records that do not contain current and accurate information ... In cases where the matches are refuted by fingerprints, the NICS Section may overturn the subject's deny decision and allow the transaction to proceed. However, because the NICS is required to purge all identifying information regarding proceed transactions within 24 hours of notification to the FFL, in many instances, the process must be repeated when the same transferee attempts subsequent firearm purchases and is again matched to the same prohibiting record." The NICS system however also includes a "Voluntary Appeal File" procedure, by which an individual may request that the NICS section retain their identifying information, rather than purging it, to prevent future erroneous denials or delays.

Between November 30, 1998 and May 31, 2016, the NICS denied 1,323,172 transactions. The top reasons for denials include: "Convicted of a crime punishable by more than one year or a misdemeanor punishable by more than two years", "Fugitive from Justice", "Misdemeanor Crime of Domestic Violence Conviction" and "Unlawful User/Addicted to a Controlled Substance".

In January 2016, USA Today reported that the FBI had stopped processing NICS denial appeals in October 2015, leaving a backlog of approximately 7,100 appeals as of January 20, 2016. The National Rifle Association said that the failure to review the appeals was a "gross disregard for those illegitimately denied their Second Amendment rights".

== Notable claims of failures ==
After the Charleston Church shooting, FBI Director James Comey apologized for "lapses in the FBI’s background-check system", saying that "An error on our part is connected to this guy’s purchase of a gun". Dylann Roof's arrest and admission that he was in possession of Suboxone without a prescription a month prior to his purchasing a firearm would have disqualified him as a prohibited person under the Gun Control Act of 1968. An internal FBI report on Roof's background check cited gaps in the agency's databases and its policies for handling background checks, along with legal restrictions on how long it can maintain certain kinds of data, for the failure. On August 30, 2019, the Fourth Circuit Court of Appeals ruled that the survivors and families of the deceased can sue the federal government.

In the wake of the Sutherland Springs church shooting, in which the gunman, 26-year-old Devin Patrick Kelley of nearby New Braunfels killed 26 and injured 20 others, the Fix NICS Act of 2017 was introduced in the 115th United States Congress. Kelley was prohibited by law from purchasing or possessing firearms and ammunition due to a domestic violence conviction in a court-martial while in the United States Air Force. The Air Force failed to record the conviction in the Federal Bureau of Investigation (FBI) National Crime Information Center database, which is used by the National Instant Criminal Background Check System to flag prohibited purchases. In the wake of the shooting, it emerged that the Department of Defense Office of Inspector General had issued reports flagging similar problems with criminal reporting in 1997 and 2015. The error in Kelley's case prompted the Air Force to begin a review. The attack was the deadliest mass shooting by one person in Texas and the fifth-deadliest mass shooting in the United States.

== See also ==
- Bipartisan Background Checks Act
- Bureau of Alcohol, Tobacco, Firearms, and Explosives
- Criminal records in the United States
- Gun politics in the United States
- Licensure
- Printz v. United States
- Universal background check
