= Straw owner =

Legal owner on behalf of another

A straw owner is a person who owns property legally or has the legal appearance of owning something but does so on behalf of another, sometimes for a fee, and typically solely to hide the identity of the effective owner. Most instances of straw ownership are legal, but the arrangement is sometimes made for nefarious, illegal purposes.

== Examples ==
In the realm of real estate, a "straw owner" would be the person who holds title to the property, and for all legal purposes and outwardly the owner, but who acts on behalf of a hidden person who installed them as the legal owner. Though the practice itself is legal, widespread, and sometimes beneficial to the parties involved, it is sometimes used to hide assets from the courts and creditors or used to purchase real estate for money laundering, arson, or for Russian kleptocrats to hide illegal gains.

There is a significant body of United States case law surrounding asset forfeiture of property held by straw owners.

Hungarian businessman Lőrinc Mészáros has frequently been identified as a straw owner due to his close personal connections with former Hungarian prime minister Viktor Orbán. The accusation has been levelled over his background as a gas fitter without formal education or qualification yet rising to become Hungary's richest man with an estimated wealth of 1,241 billion forints ($3.2 billion) as of December 2024.

== See also ==
- Straw deed
- Straw purchase
- Offshoring
- Tax evasion
- Money laundering
- Dummy corporation
- Bankruptcy fraud
