= Straw deed =

A straw deed is when two deeds are filed in quick succession, the first from Party A to Party B and then the second from Party B back to Party A and Party C. This is used to sidestep legal restrictions of sales between spouses or joint owners, or to incorporate a new survey description. Party B is a trusted intermediary, either a close friend, secretary, or an attorney.

Straw deeds are regulated by state law, for example, in Maryland and Massachusetts. In some other states, such as Wyoming, a straw person is unnecessary in cases where a person merely wants to create a Tenancy by the entirety with themselves and their spouse.

== See also ==
- Straw purchase
- Straw man (law)
- Straw owner
