= Straw purchase =

Purchase made on behalf of someone else

A straw purchase or nominee purchase is any purchase wherein an agent agrees to acquire a good or service for someone who is often unable or unwilling to purchase the good or service themselves, and the agent transfers the goods or services to that person after purchasing them. In general, straw purchases are legal except if the ultimate receiver of goods or services uses those goods or services in the commission of a crime with the prior knowledge of the straw purchaser, or the ultimate possessor is not legally able to purchase the goods or services.

In some jurisdictions, straw purchases are legal even if the end user is not legally able to purchase the good or service themselves.

== Legal uses ==
Examples of legal straw purchases would be purchasing groceries for senior citizens who are unable to go to supermarkets themselves because of poor health or financing an automobile for someone who cannot obtain a loan because of poor credit. In some cases, the agent in the straw purchase may receive money or recompense from the ultimate possessor. Obtaining loans through a straw buyer is legal except when the agent and ultimate user of the funds defraud the lender or foreseeable ultimate lender, such as by signing false mortgage documents designed to be mingled with other mortgages and securitized, or when the loan terms expressly prohibit use of an agent to obtain funds.

If straw purchases are legal despite the good or service purchased not being legal for the end user to receive, the end user may become liable for illegally possessing or receiving the good or service, but the straw buyer who was legally able to make the purchase is generally not held liable for their actions.

== Illegal uses ==
=== Firearms ===
In the United States, a straw purchaser of a firearm at a federally licensed firearm dealership who lies about the identity of the ultimate possessor of the gun can be charged with making false statements on a federal Firearms Transaction Record, which is a felony. Note that in this case, purchasing the item for another person is ipso facto illegal, regardless of that person's status as a legal possessor. If a firearm is purchased as a gift, the transaction is not a straw purchase, and the person buying the gift is considered the end user. It is illegal for any person not in possession of a Federal Firearms License to purchase a firearm with the intention of resale. Private purchases in lawful sales made outside of federally regulated dealerships are not subject to such rules and are federally legal unless the gun is used in a crime with the prior knowledge of the straw purchaser.

=== Alcohol ===
Straw purchases of alcohol are illegal in most jurisdictions when a person under the legal drinking age requests that a person above the legal age purchase alcohol for the underage person, and the straw purchaser knows or might reasonably assume based on the circumstances that the person is under the legal age.

In England and Wales, buying alcohol on behalf of a person under 18 is a summary offence under section 149 of the Licensing Act 2003, punishable by an unlimited fine (level 5 on the standard scale). There is an exception for beer, wine or cider served to a 16 or 17 year old with a meal at a table.

=== Tobacco and nicotine products ===
As of October 2015, it is an offence to buy tobacco, cigarette papers (for the purpose of smoking tobacco) or e-cigarettes on behalf of individuals under 18 years of age in England and Wales. It was already an offence in Scotland.

=== Mortgage loans ===
The use of a straw person to obtain auto or mortgage loan funds is illegal if the funds are misused intentionally. In Canada, the Bank of Montreal sued hundreds of people, including Conservative Party of Canada MP Devinder Shory, for allegedly being involved in a mortgage fraud in which the bank lost $30 million. The bank alleged that straw buyers, in exchange for a cash payment, applied for mortgage loans in the Calgary area on behalf of other parties and knew before submitting the applications that the loans would not be paid. The lawsuits were settled out of court.

In United States v. Quintero-Lopez, two men were charged with locating eight straw purchasers for homes and helping the straw purchasers falsify pay history documents in order to obtain $8.3 million in mortgage loans. The government alleged these loan purchases were illegal because the straw purchasers inflated their incomes as part of an attempt to defraud the lenders. In 2011, one of the two straw purchaser recruiters was sentenced to six years in prison and the other was sentenced to one year of probation. Straw or nominee purchases of mortgage loans are legal when intent to defraud is not present.

== See also ==
- Abramski v. United States
- Straw man (law)
- Straw owner
- Straw deed
