= Gun Control Act of 1968 =

US federal law

- Other short titles: State Firearms Control Assistance Act
- Long title: An Act to amend title 18, United States Code, to provide for better control of the interstate traffic in firearms.
- Acronyms (colloquial): GCA, GCA68
- Enacted by: the 90th United States Congress
- Effective: October 22, 1968

Citations
- Public law: 90-618
- Statutes at Large: 82 Stat. 1213-2

Codification
- Titles amended: 18 U.S.C.: Crimes and Criminal Procedure
- U.S.C. sections amended: 18 U.S.C. ch. 44 § 921

Legislative history
- Introduced in the House as H.R. 17735 by Emanuel Celler (D–NY) on June 10, 1968; Committee consideration by House Judiciary; Passed the House on July 24, 1968 (305-118); Passed the Senate on September 18, 1968 (70-17, in lieu of S. 3633); Reported by the joint conference committee on October 10, 1968; agreed to by the House on October 10, 1968 (161-129) and by the Senate on; Signed into law by President Lyndon B. Johnson on October 22, 1968

Major amendments
- Firearm Owners Protection Act; Brady Handgun Violence Prevention Act; Violence Against Women Act; Lautenberg Amendment

United States Supreme Court cases
- List: United States v. Bass, 404 U.S. 336 (1971); Printz v. United States, 521 U.S. 898 (1997); Small v. United States, 544 U.S. 385 (2005); United States v. Hayes, 555 U.S. 415 (2009); Abramski v. United States, 573 U.S. 169 (2014); Voisine v. United States, No. 14-10154, 579 U.S. ___ (2016); Rehaif v. United States, No. 17-9560, 588 U.S. ___ (2019); Greer v. United States, No. 19-8709, 593 U.S. ___ (2021)

The Gun Control Act of 1968 (GCA or GCA68) is a U.S. federal law that regulates the firearms industry and firearms ownership. Due to constitutional limitations, the Act is primarily based on regulating interstate commerce in firearms by generally prohibiting interstate firearms transfers except by manufacturers, dealers and importers licensed under a scheme set up under the Act.

The GCA was signed into law by President Lyndon B. Johnson on October 22, 1968, and is Title I of the U.S. federal firearms laws. The National Firearms Act of 1934 (NFA) is Title II. Both GCA and NFA are enforced by the Bureau of Alcohol, Tobacco, Firearms and Explosives (ATF).

18 USC chapter 44 was first enacted by the Omnibus Crime Control and Safe Streets Act of 1968. GCA repealed the Federal Firearms Act of 1938, though many of its provisions were reenacted as part of the GCA, which revised the FFA and its predecessor, the National Firearms Act of 1934 (NFA).

== History ==
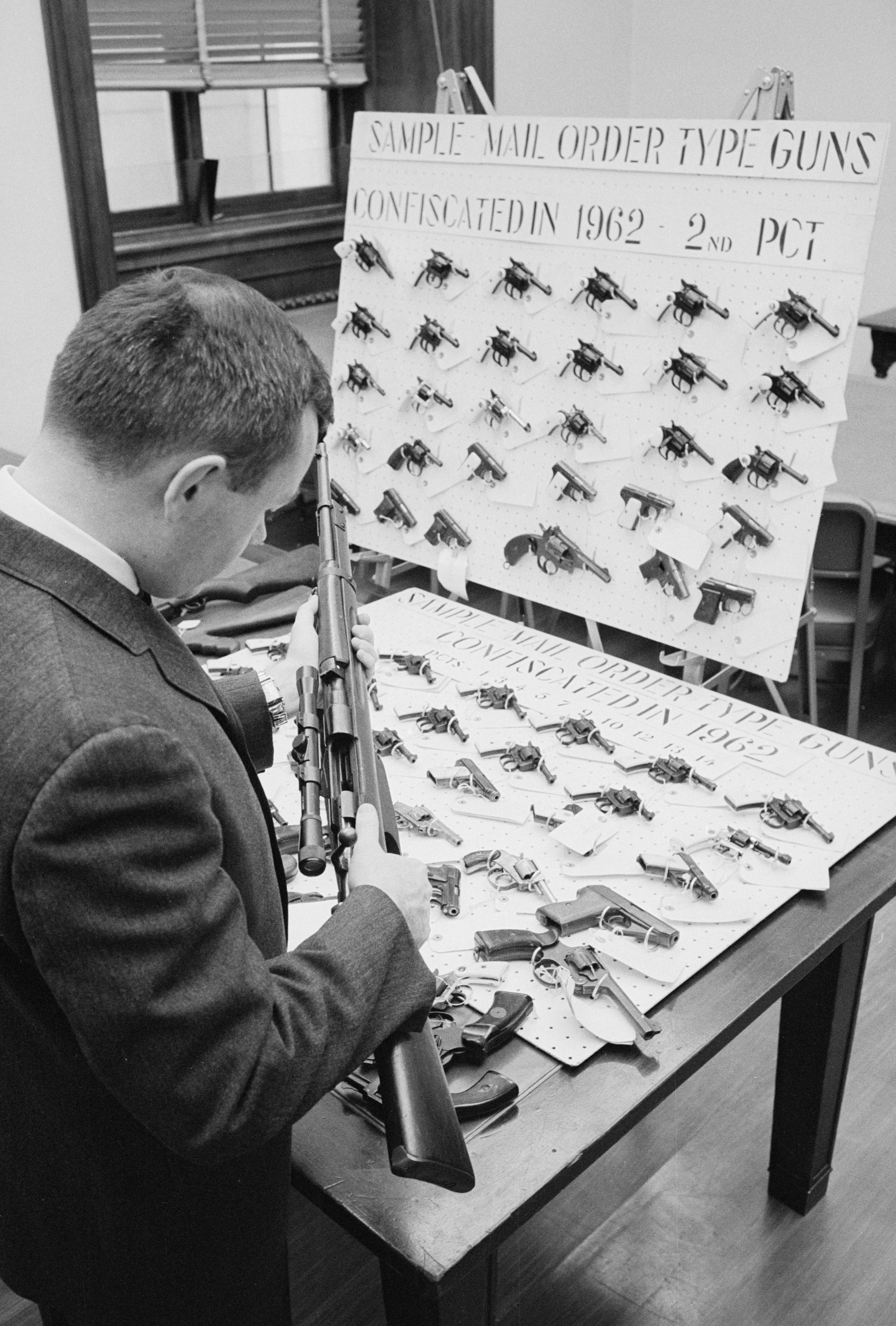
Mail-order guns being prepared for a presentation by Senator Dodd, 1965

The bill was initially prompted by the assassination of U.S. president John F. Kennedy in 1963. The president was shot and killed with a rifle purchased by mail order from an ad in the magazine American Rifleman. Congressional hearings followed and a ban on mail-order gun sales was discussed, but no law was passed until 1968. At the hearings NRA executive vice-president Franklin Orth supported a ban on mail-order sales, stating, "We do not think that any sane American, who calls himself an American, can object to placing into this bill the instrument which killed the president of the United States."

Precursors of the passage of the Gun Control Act were Senate Bill 1975 in 1963, "A Bill to Regulate the Interstate Shipment of Firearms", and Senate Bill 1592 in 1965, "A Bill to Amend the Federal Firearms Act of 1938". Both were introduced by Senator Thomas J. Dodd but in both cases the bill was met with fierce opposition, effectively shutting down the earliest efforts for gun control legislation regarding the mail-order rifles. The bill was once again introduced into the House of Representatives by the House Judiciary Committee on January 10, 1967, with this instance resulting in the bill staying on the legislative docket.

The April 4, 1968, assassination of Martin Luther King Jr., shortly followed by the June 5 assassination of Robert F. Kennedy, as well as the shooting at the University of Texas two years previously, compounded by shifting societal attitudes towards gun ownership, renewed efforts to pass the bill. On June 11, 1968, a tie vote in the House Judiciary Committee halted the bill's passage. On reconsideration nine days later, the bill was passed by the committee. The Senate Judiciary Committee similarly brought the bill to a temporary halt, but as in the House, it was passed on reconsideration. House Resolution 17735, known as the Gun Control Act, was signed into law by President Lyndon B. Johnson on October 22, 1968 banning mail-order sales of rifles and shotguns and prohibiting most felons, drug users, and people found mentally incompetent from buying guns. This act also included provisions that redefined the definitions of firearms within the United States and provided more rules for weapons manufacturers and licensed sellers on interstate commerce of ammunition and other firearm accessories.

== Prohibited persons ==
When it took effect in 1968, the Gun Control Act of 1968 stated that firearm sales were prohibited to anyone who "(1) is under indictment for, or has been convicted in a court of, a crime punishable by imprisonment for a term exceeding one year; (2) is a fugitive from justice; (3) is an unlawful user of or addicted to marijuana or any depressant or stimulant drug (as defined in section 201 (v) of the Federal Food, Drug, and Cosmetic Act) or narcotic drug (as defined in section 4731 (a) of the Internal Revenue Code of 1954)"

The Gun Control Act of 1968 was amended in 1993 by the Brady Handgun Violence Prevention Act which introduced a background check requirement of prospective gun purchasers by licensed sellers, and created a list of categories of individuals to whom the sale of firearms is prohibited: It would also be amended again in 1994 by the Violence Against Women Act to strengthen firearm bans against domestic abusers. The amended law stated:

It shall be unlawful for any person to sell or otherwise dispose of any firearm or ammunition to any person knowing or having reasonable cause to believe that such person—

(1) is under indictment for, or has been convicted in any court of, a crime punishable by imprisonment for a term exceeding one year;

(2) is a fugitive from justice;

(3) is an unlawful user of or addicted to any controlled substance (as defined in section 102 of the Controlled Substances Act (21 U.S.C. 802));

(4) has been adjudicated as a mental defective or has been committed to any mental institution at 16 years of age or older;

(5) who, being an alien;

(A) is illegally or unlawfully in the United States; or
(B) except as provided in subsection (y)(2), has been admitted to the United States under a nonimmigrant visa (as that term is defined in section 101(a)(26) of the Immigration and Nationality Act (8 U.S.C. 1101 (a)(26)))

(6) who has been discharged from the Armed Forces under dishonorable conditions;

(7) who, having been a citizen of the United States, has renounced their citizenship;

(8) is subject to a court order that restrains such person from harassing, stalking, or threatening an intimate partner of such person or child of such intimate partner or person, or engaging in other conduct that would place an intimate partner in reasonable fear of bodily injury to the partner or child, except that this paragraph shall only apply to a court order that—

(A) was issued after a hearing of which such person received actual notice, and at which such person had the opportunity to participate; and
(B)
(i) includes a finding that such person represents a credible threat to the physical safety of such intimate partner or child; or
(ii) by its terms explicitly prohibits the use, attempted use, or threatened use of physical force against such intimate partner or child that would reasonably be expected to cause bodily injury; or

(9) has been convicted in any court of a misdemeanor crime of domestic violence.

With the following exceptions:

(ii) A person shall not be considered to have been convicted of such an offense for purposes of this chapter if the conviction has been expunged or set aside, or is an offense for which the person has been pardoned or has had civil rights restored (if the law of the applicable jurisdiction provides for the loss of civil rights under such an offense) unless the pardon, expungement, or restoration of civil rights expressly provides that the person may not ship, transport, possess, or receive firearms.

18 U.S.C 922 (3) imposes punishment for being a drug addict, which was found to be unconstitutional by SCOTUS in Robinson v. California in 1962.

While many states upon completion of a sentence automatically reinstate rights to vote, sit on a jury, or serve in public office, no states restore gun ownership rights upon completion of a sentence, with the exception of Wyoming. Some states reinstate rights depending on the crime convicted of, and others have a petition process. In 2023 the state of Wyoming became the first state to automatically restore gun ownership rights to non-violent felons, who complete their sentence; W.S. §7-13-105 went into effect on July 1, 2023 and allows individuals that are convicted as a first time, non-violent felon, to have their right to vote, serve on a jury, hold public office and possess a firearm restored five years after their completion of sentence including applicable periods of probation or parole. Those convicted of a federal offense must contact the Office of the Pardon Attorney, Department of Justice, to receive a presidential pardon. Under the Department's rules governing petitions for executive clemency, 28 C.F.R. §§ 1.1 et seq., an applicant must satisfy a minimum waiting period of five years before he becomes eligible to apply for a presidential pardon of his federal conviction.

According to a 21 Sep 2011 "Open Letter to All Federal Firearms Licensees" from the ATF, holders of state-issued medical marijuana cards are automatically "prohibited people" under 18 U.S.C 922 (g)(3) and "shipping, transporting, receiving or possessing firearms or ammunition" by a medical marijuana card holder is a violation.

Additionally, 18 U.S.C 922 (x) generally prohibits people under 18 years of age from possessing handguns or handgun ammunition with certain exceptions for employment, target practice, education, and a handgun possessed while defending the home of the juvenile or a home in which they are a guest. On January 25, 2025 the United States Court of Appeals for the Fifth Circuit made a landmark opinion in the case of Reese v. Bureau of Alcohol, Tobacco, Firearms, and Explosives (ATF), holding that 18 U.S.C. §§ 922(b)(1) and (c)(1), which prohibit federal firearms licensees (FFLs) from selling handguns to individuals aged 18 to 20, are unconstitutional under the Second Amendment. The case arose from three non-profit youth sport shooting group's who were unable to obtain handguns from an FFL dealer due to their members being under 21, they filed a suit alleging that 18 U.S.C. §§ 922(b)(1) and (c)(1) not only violates the Second Amendment but also the Fifth Amendment's equal protection clause.

The Brady Handgun Violence Prevention Act of 1993 created the National Instant Criminal Background Check System (NICS) to prevent firearms sales to such prohibited people.

The Violence Against Women Act of 1994 strengthened bans against domestic abusers by enforcing domestic violence protection orders which barred people subject to family violence protection orders from having firearms.

In 2025, a federal court ruling struck down 18 U.S.C 922 (g)(3) as being unconstitutional when applied to occasional users of marijuana and other drugs, so long as they are not impaired at the time of possession or use of a firearm. The 2025 ruling stems from a unanimous ruling in August of 2023 in which a three-judge panel of the 5th U.S. Circuit Court of Appeals dismissed the April 2022 conviction of Patrick Daniels, Jr. who was charged with several counts of unlawful possession of a firearm after law enforcement officers searched his car during a stop and found marijuana butts and two loaded firearms; a drug test wasn't administered but Daniels admitted to being a regular user; the court's ruling stated "history and tradition may support some limits on an intoxicated person’s right to carry a weapon, but it does not justify disarming a sober citizen based exclusively on his past drug usage nor does it support permanently disarming nonviolent drug users". This ruling was appealed to the Supreme Court of the United States who reversed the opinion of the 5th Circuit Court and ordered them to rehear the case in light of it being found Daniels was also under an order of protection for domestic violence. On January 6, 2025 the 5th US Circuit Court of Appeals issued a revised ruling based on Daniels domestic violence charge and the SCOTUS ruling that it is not unconstitutional and in line with history to disarm someone who is threatening physical violence. Their revised ruling determined that "922(g)(3) was not per se unconstitutional" and allowed the statute itself to stand, agreeing it was valid if it was determined an individual was actively impaired by illegal drug use at the time; but also determined it could not be used to constitutionally disarm someone for life, based solely on habitual or occasional drug use. The conclusion of their opinion stated that 922(g)(3) might apply to someone whose drug use is so frequent "that is renders them continually impaired".

== Federal Firearms License (FFL) system ==
The Gun Control Act mandated the licensing of individuals and companies engaged in the business of selling firearms. This provision effectively prohibited the direct mail order of firearms (except antique firearms) by consumers and mandated that anyone who wants to buy a gun in an interstate transaction from a source other than a private individual must do so through a federally licensed firearms dealer. The Act also banned unlicensed individuals from acquiring handguns outside their state of residence. The interstate purchase of long guns (rifles and shotguns) was not impeded by the Act so long as the seller is federally licensed and such a sale is allowed by both the state of purchase and the state of residence.

Private sales between residents of two different states are also prohibited without going through a licensed dealer, except for the case of a buyer holding a Curio & Relic license purchasing a firearm that qualifies as a curio or relic.

Private sales between unlicensed individuals who are residents of the same state are allowed under federal law so long as such transfers do not violate the other existing federal and state laws. While current law mandates that a background check be performed if the seller has a federal firearms license, private parties living in the same state are not required to perform such checks under federal law.

A person who does not have a Federal Firearms License may not be in the business of buying or selling firearms. Individuals buying and selling firearms without a federal license must be doing so from their collection.

Under the Gun Control Act, a federally licensed importer, manufacturer, dealer, or collector shall not sell or deliver any rifle or shotgun or ammunition for rifle or shotgun to any individual less than 18 years of age, nor any handgun or ammunition for a handgun to any individual less than 21 years of age.

=== Gunsmith and factory repair exception ===
While the Gun Control Act prohibits the direct mail-ordering of firearms, a person may ship a gun via contract carrier (such as United Parcel Service (UPS), United States Postal Service, or FedEx) to a gunsmith (who has an FFL) or the gunmaker's factory for repairs or modification. After the repair work is done, the gunsmith or the factory can ship the gun directly back to the customer.

== Import restrictions ==
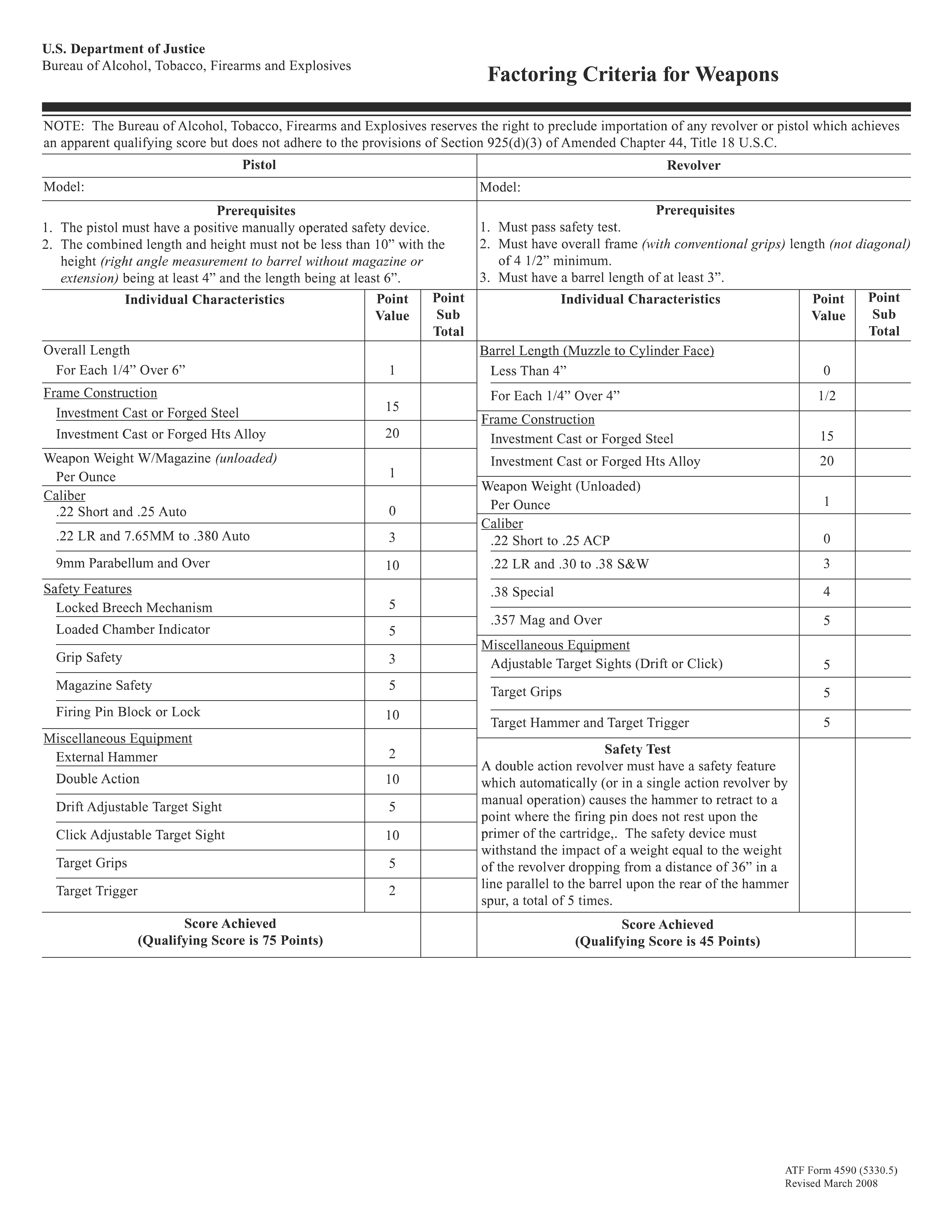
ATF Form 4590 ("Factoring Criteria for Weapons")

The GCA created what is known as the "sporting purposes" standard for imported firearms, saying that they must "be generally recognized as particularly suitable for or readily adaptable to sporting purposes". GCA sporting purposes include hunting and organized competitive target shooting but do not include "plinking" or "practical shooting" (which the ATF says is closer to police/combat-style competition and not comparable to more traditional types of sports), nor does it allow for collection for historical or design interest.

== Marking requirements ==
The law also required that all newly manufactured firearms produced by licensed manufacturers in the United States and imported into the United States bear a gun serial number. Firearms manufactured before the Gun Control Act and firearms manufactured by non-FFLs remain exempt from the serial number requirement. Defacement or removal of the serial number (if present) became a felony offense under the law where previously no serial number was required.

== Commentary ==
In a June 1966 essay, Neal Knox wrote that what was then called the Dodd Bill was opposed by outdoorsmen and conservationists Harry R. Woodward, C. R. Gutermuth of the Wildlife Management Institute, Richard H. Stroud of the Sport Fishing Institute, Howard Carter Jr. of the National Shooting Sports Foundation, E. C. Hadley of the Sporting Arms and Ammunition Manufacturers' Institute, Robert T. Dennis of the Izaak Walton League, "and countless other sportsmen, and sportsmen and industry groups" because it would have a far-reaching and damaging effect on the hunting and shooting sports, while failing to reduce crime.

In his remarks upon signing the act in October 1968, Johnson said:

Congress adopted most of our recommendations. But this bill—as big as this bill is—still falls short, because we just could not get the Congress to carry out the requests we made of them. I asked for the national registration of all guns and the licensing of those who carry those guns. For the fact of life is that there are over 160 million guns in this country—more firearms than families. If guns are to be kept out of the hands of the criminal, out of the hands of the insane, and out of the hands of the irresponsible, then we just must have licensing. If the criminal with a gun is to be tracked down quickly, then we must have registration in this country. The voices that blocked these safeguards were not the voices of an aroused nation. They were the voices of a powerful lobby, a gun lobby, that has prevailed for the moment in an election year.

At the time of its passage in 1968, NRA executive vice president Franklin Orth wrote in American Rifleman that "the measure as a whole appears to be one that the sportsmen of America can live with".

In the May 1993 issue of Guns & Ammo magazine, Jews for the Preservation of Firearms Ownership (JPFO) compared the GCA to Nazi gun laws.

In a 2011 article noting the death of former U.S. senator James A. McClure, the NRA called provisions of the GCA "draconian". McClure was a cosponsor of the Firearm Owners Protection Act (FOPA) of 1986, also called the McClure-Volkmer Act.

Political scientist Robert Spitzer wrote in 2011 that the Gun Control Act of 1968 "provides an ideal case study to highlight the political processes affecting a direct effort to regulate firearms". He also stated in his book that President Johnson's proposal called for national registration of all guns as well as licensing for all gun carriers, but his influence over the enacted law was small. House Rules Committee chair William Colmer only released H.R. 17735 to the floor after Judiciary Committee chair Emanuel Celler promised to oppose efforts to add licensing and registration provisions.

== See also ==
- Gun law in the United States
- Gun politics in the United States
