= Firearm Owners Protection Act =

1986 United States federal gun control law

Firearms Owners' Protection Act of 1986
- Long title: An Act to amend chapter 44 (relating to firearms) of title 18, United States Code, and for other purposes.
- Acronyms (colloquial): FOPA
- Enacted by: the 99th United States Congress
- Effective: May 19, 1986

Citations
- Public law: Pub. L. 99–308
- Statutes at Large: 100 Stat. 449

Codification
- Acts amended: Gun Control Act of 1968
- Titles amended: 18 U.S.C.: Crimes and Criminal Procedure; 26 U.S.C.: Internal Revenue Code
- U.S.C. sections amended: 18 U.S.C. ch. 44 § 921 et seq.; 18 U.S.C. ch. 40 § 845; I.R.C. ch. 53, subch. A § 5801

Legislative history
- Introduced in the Senate as S. 49 by James A. McClure (R–ID) on January 3, 1985; Committee consideration by House Judiciary; Passed the Senate on July 9, 1985 (79-15); Passed the House on April 10, 1986 (292-130, in lieu of H.R. 4332); Signed into law by President Ronald Reagan on May 19, 1986

The Firearm Owners' Protection Act (FOPA) of 1986 is a United States federal law that revised many provisions of the Gun Control Act of 1968.

== Federal firearms law reform ==
Under the Gun Control Act of 1968, the Bureau of Alcohol, Tobacco and Firearms (ATF) was given wide latitude on the enforcement of regulations pertaining to holders of Federal Firearms Licenses (FFL) (which enable an individual or a company to engage in a business pertaining to the manufacture or importation of firearms and ammunition, or the interstate and intrastate sale of firearms). Allegations of abuse by ATF inspectors after passage of the act arose from the National Rifle Association (NRA) and some FFL licensees. In particular, advocates claimed that ATF was repeatedly inspecting FFL holders for the apparent purpose of harassment intended to drive the FFL holders out of business (as the FFL holders would constantly be having to tend to ATF inspections instead of to customers).

A February 1982 report by the Senate subcommittee that studied the Second Amendment to the United States Constitution concluded:

The conclusion is thus inescapable that the history, concept, and wording of the second amendment to the Constitution of the United States, as well as its interpretation by every major commentator and court in the first half-century after its ratification, indicates that what is protected is an individual right of a private citizen to own and carry firearms in a peaceful manner.

The report also said that 75 percent of ATF prosecutions "were aimed at ordinary citizens who had neither criminal intent nor knowledge, but were enticed by agents into unknowing technical violations." It suggested that reform of federal firearms law such as proposed in S. 1030 "would be largely self-enforcing" and "would enhance vital protection of constitutional and civil liberties of those Americans who choose to exercise their Second Amendment right to keep and bear arms."

The Firearm Owners Protection Act of 1986 (FOPA) addressed the abuses noted in the 1982 Senate Judiciary Subcommittee report. Among the reforms were the reopening of interstate sales of long guns on a limited basis, legalization of ammunition shipments through the U.S. Postal Service, removal of the requirement for record keeping on sales of non-armor-piercing ammunition, and federal protection of transportation of firearms through states where possession of those firearms would otherwise be illegal.

The Act also contained a provision that banned the sale to civilians of machine guns manufactured after the date of enactment, restricting sales of these weapons to the military and law enforcement. Thus, in the ensuing years, the limited supply of these arms available to civilians has caused an enormous increase in their price, with most costing in excess of $10,000. Regarding these fully-automatic firearms owned by private citizens in the U.S., political scientist Earl Kruschke said "approximately 175,000 automatic firearms have been licensed by the Bureau of Alcohol, Tobacco, and Firearms (the federal agency responsible for administration of the law) and evidence suggests that none of these weapons has ever been used to commit a violent crime."

The Act mandated that ATF compliance inspections can be done no more than once per year. An exception exists if multiple record-keeping violations are recorded in an inspection, in which case the ATF may do a follow-up inspection.

== Reactions ==
The bill was endorsed by the NRA. It was opposed by police organizations, including the Federal Law Enforcement Officers Association, Police Foundation, International Association of Chiefs of Police, Fraternal Order of Police, National Troopers Coalition, Police Executive Research Forum, National Sheriffs' Association, National Organization of Black Law Enforcement Executives, International Union of Police Associations, National Association of Police Organizations and the New York City Police Commissioner.

== Ban on new automatic firearms ==
As debate for FOPA was in its final stages in the House before moving on to the Senate, Rep. William J. Hughes (D-N.J.) proposed several amendments including House Amendment 777 to H.R. 4332, which modified the act to ban the civilian ownership of new machine guns, specifically to amend 18 U.S.C. § 922 to add subsection (o):

(o)(1) Except as provided in paragraph (2), it shall be unlawful for any person to transfer or possess a machinegun.

(2) This subsection does not apply with respect to— (A) a transfer to or by, or possession by or under the authority of, the United States or any department or agency thereof or a State, or a department, agency, or political subdivision thereof; or

(B) any lawful transfer or lawful possession of a machinegun that was lawfully possessed before the date this subsection takes effect.

On April 10, 1986, House Amendment 777 passed the House by voice vote. Despite some controversy over whether the amendment should have been given a recorded vote, the bill as a whole passed the House and the Senate, and was signed on May 19, 1986, by President Ronald Reagan to become Public Law 99-308, the Firearms Owners' Protection Act.

The ATF, as a representative of the U.S. and with authority from the National Firearms Act, can authorize the transfer of a machine gun to an unlicensed civilian. An unlicensed individual may acquire machine guns, with ATF approval. The transferor must file an ATF application, which must be completed by both parties to the transfer:

- executed under penalties of perjury
- both parties must reside in the same state as the individual
- pay a $200 transfer tax to ATF
- the application must include detailed information on the firearm and the parties to the transfer
- the transferee must certify on the application that he or she is not disqualified from possessing firearms on grounds specified in law
- the transferee must submit with the application (1) two photographs taken within the past year; and (2) fingerprints
- the transferee must submit with the application (3) a copy of any state or local permit or license required to buy, possess, or acquire machine guns
- an appropriate (local) law enforcement official must certify whether he or she has any information indicating that the firearm will be used for other than lawful purposes or that possession would violate state or federal law
- the transferee must, as part of the registration process, pass an extensive Federal Bureau of Investigation criminal background investigation.

If ATF denies an application, it must refund the tax. Gun owners must keep approved applications as evidence of registration of the firearms and make them available for inspection by ATF officers.

On August 21, 2024, District Judge John W. Broomes, citing New York State Rifle & Pistol Association, Inc. v. Bruen, threw out charges against a Kansas man for illegal machine gun possession as unconstitutional under the Second Amendment.

== "Safe passage" provision ==
One of the law's provisions (codified in section 926A of Title 18, U.S. Code) federally codifies regulations around the transportation of firearms directly from one state to another, and pre-empts existing state regulations. Barring short stops for food and gasoline, persons not otherwise prohibited from possessing firearms may transport them from state to state, provided the firearms are legal in both the state of departure and state of arrival. For transportation, the firearms and ammunition must not be readily accessible; the firearms must be unloaded and, in the case of a vehicle without a compartment separate from the driver's compartment, the firearms must be located in a locked container other than the glove compartment or center console.

Whether or not this section protects air travel is disputed.

Definitions of certain terms in the law include:

- Transporting. Not staying for any determined length of time. Passing through on the way to some place.
- Unloaded. No ammunition in the firearm. In the case of McDaniel v. Arnold, the courts upheld a conviction based on the interpretation that the accused had a loaded firearm despite not having a round in the chambered position.
- Not readily accessible. There are no clear court decisions or interpretations available but this term is widely regarded as meaning not capable of being reached quickly for operation.
- Locked container. A hard-sided container that is locked such as to prevent unauthorized users from gaining access.

The Act also forbade the U.S. Government agency from keeping a registry directly linking non-National Firearms Act firearms to their owners, the specific language of this law (Federal Law 18 U.S.C. 926) being:

No such rule or regulation prescribed [by the Attorney General] after the date of the enactment of the Firearms Owners Protection Act may require that records required to be maintained under this chapter or any portion of the contents of such records, be recorded at or transferred to a facility owned, managed, or controlled by the United States or any State or any political subdivision thereof, nor that any system of registration of firearms, firearms owners, or firearms transactions or disposition be established. Nothing in this section expands or restricts the Secretary's authority to inquire into the disposition of any firearm in the course of a criminal investigation.

Nevertheless, at one point the ATF's National Tracing Center (NTC) contained hundreds of millions of firearm tracing and registration records, and consisted of several databases; but as of May 2016, many of these databases have been deleted to fall inline with record deletion requirements, per the Government Accountability Office (GAO).

1. Multiple Sale Reports. In accordance with the Gun Control Act of 1968, Federal Firearms Licensees (FFLs) are required to report the sale of multiple handguns to the same person within 24 hours or within five consecutive business days, a program overseen by the ATF and reported through ATF Form 3310.4, which requires disclosure of the firearms sold and new owner and address. The program is used by the ATF to detect, investigate and prevent firearms trafficking. Reported as 4.2 million records in 2010.

2. Suspect Guns. All guns suspected of being used for criminal purposes and that "may or may not be in the possession of an LEA (law enforcement agency)." This database includes (ATF's own examples), individuals purchasing large quantities of firearms, and dealers with improper record keeping. May include guns observed by law enforcement in an estate, or at a gun show, or elsewhere. Reported as 34,807 in 2010.

3. Traced Guns. Over 4 million detail records from all traces since inception. This is a registration record which includes the personal information of the first retail purchaser, along with the identity of the selling dealer.

4. Out of Business Records. Data is manually collected from paper out of business records (or input from computer records) and entered into the trace system by ATF. These are registration records which include name and address, make, model, serial and caliber of the firearm(s), as well as data from the 4473 form - in digital or image format. In March, 2010, ATF reported receiving several hundred million records since 1968.

5. Theft Guns. Firearms reported as stolen to ATF. Contained 330,000 records in 2010. Contains only thefts from licensed dealers and interstate carriers (optional). Does not have an interface to the FBI's National Crime Information Center (NCIC) theft data base, where the majority of stolen, lost and missing firearms are reported.

=== Clarification of prohibited persons ===
The older Gun Control Act of 1968 prohibits firearms ownership in the U.S. by certain categories of individuals thought to pose a threat to public safety. However, this list differed between the House and the Senate versions of the bill, and led to confusion. The list was later augmented, modified, and clarified in the Firearm Owners Protection Act of 1986. The 1986 list is:

- Anyone who has been convicted in any court of a felony punishable by imprisonment for a term exceeding one year, excluding those crimes punishable by imprisonment related to the regulation of business practices, whose full civil rights have not been restored by the State in which the firearms disability was first imposed.
- Anyone who is a fugitive from justice.
- Anyone who is an unlawful user of or addicted to any controlled substances.
- Anyone who has been adjudicated as a mental defective or has been involuntarily committed to a mental institution.
- Any alien illegally or unlawfully in the United States or an alien admitted to the United States under a nonimmigrant visa. The exception is if the nonimmigrant is in possession of a valid hunting license issued by a US state and/or has been granted a waiver from the Attorney General.
- Anyone who has been discharged from the Armed Forces under dishonorable conditions.
- Anyone who, having been a citizen of the United States, has renounced his or her citizenship.
- Anyone that is subject to a court order that restrains the person from harassing, stalking, or threatening an intimate partner or child of such intimate partner. (Added in 1996, with the Lautenberg Amendment.)
- Anyone who has been convicted of a misdemeanor crime of domestic violence. (Added in 1996, with the Lautenberg Amendment)
- A person who is under indictment or information for a crime (misdemeanor) punishable by imprisonment for a term exceeding two years cannot lawfully receive a firearm. Such person may continue to lawfully possess firearms obtained prior to the indictment or information, and if cleared or acquitted can receive firearms without restriction.

These provisions are stated in the form of questions on Federal Form 4473.

In 2001, the United States Court of Appeals for the Fifth Circuit (consisting of Texas, Louisiana and Mississippi) ruled that the Lautenberg Amendment, 18 U.S.C. § 922(g)(8)(C)(ii) (which extended the original FOPA restrictions on firearm ownership to persons under a court order in connection with domestic violence) did not violate the Second Amendment, and did not violate the Due Process Clause of the Fifth Amendment as applied to the defendant, in United States v. Emerson.

== See also ==
- Gun ownership
- Gun law in the United States
- Gun politics in the United States
