= Federal firearms license =

US license to enable an individual or a company to be in the firearms business

A federal firearms license (FFL) is a license in the United States that enables an individual or a company to engage in a business pertaining to the manufacture or importation of firearms and ammunition, or the interstate and intrastate sale of firearms. Holding an FFL to engage in certain such activities has been a legal requirement within the United States since the enactment of the Gun Control Act of 1968. The FFL is issued by the Bureau of Alcohol, Tobacco, Firearms, and Explosives (BATFE, commonly shortened to ATF).

== History ==
The federal firearms license was established to and implement the Gun Control Act of 1968. The 1968 act was an update or revision of the Federal Firearms Act of 1938 (FFA), which required all manufacturers and dealers of firearms who ship or receive firearms or ammunition in interstate or foreign commerce to have a license, and forbade them from transferring any firearm or most ammunition to any person interstate unless certain conditions were met. As a practical matter, this did not affect the interstate commerce in firearms or ammunition, because the 1938 FFA lacked a provision specifically restricting "prohibited purchasers" as defined in the FFA from purchasing firearms under false pretenses/documentation (i.e. those who would otherwise have been considered "prohibited purchasers" were still able to get away with firearms purchases by providing falsified identity information; since background checks as understood today did not yet exist, convicted felons and other "prohibited purchasers" would still buy firearms unhindered by using fake identification). It was with the adoption of the Gun Control Act (GCA) in 1968, which repealed most of the FFA, that the lawful interstate trade of firearms was limited almost entirely to persons holding a federal firearms license in the United States. As background checks were available by this time, enforcement of the GCA via the bottleneck provided by background checks and the FFL requirement was more effective than that of the FFA.

== Types ==
Type	Name	Usage
Type 01	Dealer in Firearms Other Than Destructive Devices (Includes Gunsmiths)	Dealer and gunsmith in firearms. This license allows to the holder to act as a dealer in Title I firearms. May also deal in Title II (NFA) firearms—other than destructive devices—with tax payment to obtain a Class 3 SOT status.
Type 02	Pawnbroker in Firearms Other Than Destructive Devices	Dealer in firearms doing business as a pawnbroker. This license allows the holder to take or receive Title I firearms as security for the payment or repayment of a loan. This is in addition to the other activities permitted for a Type 01 dealer. May also deal in Title II firearms—other than destructive devices—or take and receive them as security with a Class 3 SOT status.
Type 03	Collector of Curios and Relics	Licensed collector of Curios & Relic (C&R) firearms. This licence only allows the holder to acquire firearms classified as C&Rs without a background check from other licensed C&R collectors, as well as from licensed dealers and importers. Does not allow the license holder to engage in the business of dealing in firearms or acquire Title II firearms without a Form 4 approval, unless the firearm has been granted a C&R exemption by the ATF.
Type 06	Manufacturer of Ammunition for Firearms	Manufacturer of ammunition for firearms—other than ammunition for destructive devices or armor-piercing ammunition. This license allows the holder to manufacture ammunition only, they may not manufacture firearms or act as a dealer.
Type 07	Manufacturer of Firearms Other Than Destructive Devices	Manufacturer of firearms and ammunition. This license allows the holder to act as a manufacturer of Title I firearms and ammunition. Can also act as a dealer and gunsmith in Title I firearms. May also manufacture and deal in Title II firearms—other than destructive devices, ammunition for destructive devices, or armor-piercing ammunition—with a Class 2 SOT status.
Type 08	Importer of Firearms Other than Destructive Devices	Importer of firearms and ammunition. This license allows the holder to import Title I firearms and ammunition into the country from licensed dealers and manufacturers outside the United States. Can also act as a Title I dealer and gunsmith. May also act as an importer and dealer in Title II firearms—other than destructive devices, ammunition for destructive devices, or armor-piercing ammunition—with a Class 1 SOT status.
Type 09	Dealer in Destructive Devices	Dealer in destructive devices and firearms. This license allows the holder to act as a dealer and gunsmith in both Title I and Title II firearms—including destructive devices, ammunition for destructive devices, or armor-piercing ammunition. Requires having Class 3 SOT status. Dealing any destructive device, or ammunition, with an explosives content (e.g. flash-bangs, grenade launchers, explosive rounds) requires an additional Federal Explosives License (FEL) as a Dealer of High Explosives.
Type 10	Manufacturer of Destructive Devices	Manufacturer of destructive devices, firearms and ammunition. This license allows the holder to act as a manufacturer of Title I and Title II firearms and ammunition—including manufacturing destructive devices, ammunition for destructive devices, or armor-piercing ammunition. Can also act as a Title I and Title II dealer and gunsmith. Requires having Class 2 SOT status. Manufacturing any destructive device, or ammunition, with an explosives content (e.g. flash-bangs, RPGs) requires an additional FEL as a Type 20 Manufacturer of High Explosives.
Type 11	Importer of Destructive Devices	Importer of destructive devices, firearms and ammunition. This license allows the holder to import firearms and ammunition—including destructive devices, ammunition for destructive devices, and armor piercing ammunition—into the country. Can also act as a Title I and Title II dealer and gunsmith. Requires having Class 1 SOT status. Importing any destructive device, or ammunition, with an explosives content (e.g. flash-bangs), requires an additional FEL as an Importer of High Explosives.

=== Imports and ammunition ===
- Federal Firearms License holders who are a Type 01/02/09 dealer or a Type 07/10 manufacturer are allowed to occasionally import a limited number of firearms without being required to obtain a Type 08/11 importers license; how often they can do so and how many firearms they can import is solely up to the discretion of the Director of the ATF. To import a firearm, a dealer or manufacturer must apply for a permit to do so, this can be done by filling out and submitting an ATF Form 6: Application and Permit for Importation of Firearms, Ammunition and Defense Articles by a Licensee, other than an Importer.
- Under federal law, a Federal Firearms License is not required for dealing ammunition only. However, under certain state's laws, selling ammunition can require a state license and in some cases an additional county or city license:
  - California: Federal Firearms License or California Ammunition Vendor License is required for the commercial sale of ammunition (more than 500 rounds in a 30-day period). Ammunition purchases require a background check. Online ammunition purchases must be shipped to a FFL.
  - Connecticut: Federal Firearms License or Connecticut Ammunition Dealer's License is required for anyone selling ammunition. Ammunition purchases require a valid Connecticut State Pistol Permit (CTP) or Long Gun Eligibility Certificate. Direct online ammo sales only, no third-party sales (Drop Ship).
  - Illinois: Ammunition only dealers are not required to be licensed, however anyone selling ammunition must verify the buyer possesses a valid Illinois Firearm Owner's Identification (FOID) Card. No Drop Ship online sales, online ammunition sales prohibited in Chicago & Cook County.
  - Massachusetts: Massachusetts License to Sell Ammunition is required for anyone selling ammunition, including dealers/manufacturers with a Federal Firearms License. Ammunition purchases require a valid Firearms License to Carry (LTC) or Firearms Identification (FID) card. Online ammo sales prohibited.
  - New Jersey: New Jersey Retail Firearms Dealer License is required for anyone selling ammunition, including dealers/manufacturers with a Federal Firearms License. A Firearms Purchaser Identification Card (FPID), Permit to Purchase a Handgun, or Permit to Carry a Handgun is required for handgun ammunition purchase. No drop ship ammunition sales.
  - New York: Ammunition dealers must register as a seller of ammunition with the New York State Police, separate registration is not required for Federal Firearms License holders already registered as a firearms dealer or manufacturer; ammunition dealers in New York City must have both a Federal Firearms License & a New York State Firearms Dealer License, and register as a seller of ammunition with the New York City Police Department. Ammunition purchases require a background check. Online ammunition purchases must be shipped to a FFL.
  - Rhode Island: Ammunition only dealers are not required to be licensed, ammunition can only be sold to persons over the age of 21 who possess a valid Pistol or Revolver Safety Certificate issued by the Department of Environmental Management.

== Special Occupational Taxpayers classes ==
Certain types of firearms, accessories and other weapons are restricted under the National Firearms Act (NFA). In addition to a current FFL (of whatever "type" is applicable), the ATF requires that business owners who are planning to import, manufacture or deal in restricted materials also pay a Special Occupational Tax, or "SOT" (thereby making the business owner a "Special Occupational Taxpayer").

Class	Usage
Class 1	Importer of NFA firearms
Class 2	Manufacturer & dealer of NFA firearms
Class 3	Dealer of NFA firearms

Class 1 SOT status requires an importer FFL, either Type 08 or 11.
Class 2 SOT status requires a manufacturer FFL, either Type 07 or 10.
Class 3 SOT status requires a dealer FFL, either Type 01, 02, or 09.

== Collectors of curio and relic (C&R) firearms ==
C&R firearms are defined in Title 27, Code of Federal Regulations, Part 478.11 as those "of special interest to collectors by reason of some quality other than is associated with firearms intended for sporting use or as offensive or defensive weapons." To be recognized by ATF as a C&R firearm, a firearm must fall into at least one of the following three categories:

1. Firearms manufactured more than 50 years prior to the current date, not including replicas
2. Firearms certified by the curator of a municipal, state, or federal museum that exhibits firearms as curios or relics of museum interest
3. Any other firearms that derive a substantial part of their monetary value from the fact that they are novel, rare, bizarre, or because of their association with some historical figure, period, or event. Proof of qualification of a particular firearm under this category requires evidence of present value and evidence that like firearms are not available except as collector's items, or that the value of like firearms available in ordinary commercial channels is substantially less.

C&R firearms include most manually operated and semi-automatic firearms used by a military force prior to 1976. This includes most firearms used by the warring nations in World War I and World War II. However, the firearm must normally also be in its original configuration to retain the C&R designation. So, for example, an unaltered Mauser Karabiner 98k rifle used by the German Army in World War II is a C&R firearm – but the same rifle "sporterized" with new stock and finish is generally not considered a C&R firearm. There is an ambiguous point in how the license is currently administered, in that some firearms altered by the militaries that issued them have been confirmed by the ATF to retain C&R status, though whether this applies to all such conversions (the examples given by the ATF were the Spanish M1916 Guardia Civil, FR-7, and FR-8 Mausers) also remains ambiguous. However, as long as the receiver (the part of the firearm that is regulated by the ATF) is over 50 years old, the firearm qualifies as a Curio & Relic – ATF states explicitly that, in addition to newer firearms it individually approves, firearms automatically achieve C&R status upon turning 50, provided they are in the original configuration. If modified significantly, the 50-year clock resets to the date of modification. (Specific examples are available in the ATF FAQs.) Certain automatic firearms have been designated as C&R firearms, and a C&R may be used to acquire these as well.

Collectors may acquire C&R firearms in interstate commerce, e.g., via mail or phone order or the Internet, or in person. (This is especially important for collectors of pistols and revolvers since they may not otherwise be acquired outside a collector's state of residence.) Collectors are not considered to be FFL dealers and have no special privileges concerning non-C&R firearms, nor may they "engage in the business" of regularly selling C&R firearms to persons who do not have an FFL. Selling of C&R firearms does not require an FFL transfer across state lines, only if the firearm has a collectible status. The purpose of the C&R license is to enable a collector to acquire C&R firearms for their personal collection and not to become a firearms dealer.

=== Curio & relic compliance inspections ===
(D) At the election of a licensed collector, the annual inspection of records and inventory permitted under this paragraph shall be performed at the ATF office designed for such inspections which is located in closest proximity to the premises where the inventory and records of such licensed collector are maintained.

—ATF 2005 Regulations page 18. (ATF Publication 5300.4)

=== Conversion of C&R firearms ===
Any firearm sold as a C&R firearm once changed out of its original configuration cannot be resold as a C&R firearm. In regard to conversions; certain pistols have been approved for sale with added safety conversions (i.e. Polish and Romanian Tokarev pistols, to which a manual safety was added to meet import requirements). Certain other modifications, such as period sporterisations, are arguably C&R qualified as they represent the gun culture of the period. An example would be a Lee–Enfield or 98K Mauser military rifle that had been converted into a continental style sporter before World War II. These common conversions occurred more than 50 years ago, and represent a sub-type of special interest to collectors.

=== Antiques ===
Federal law defines guns manufactured in or before 1898 with unconventional firing mechanisms (such as percussion, flintlock and other combustion methods typically considered "black powder"), or cartridge firearms that have uncommon and not readily available ammo types (.30-40 Krag, .30 Mauser, .44 Russian, etc.) as "antique" (26 USC §5845(G)), (27 CFR §478.11) and they are generally unregulated in federal law. They may be bought and sold across state lines without an FFL. The only exceptions are short-barreled rifles, short barreled shotguns, and machine guns, which are regulated under the National Firearms Act of 1934. Unlike C&R guns, antique guns can be re-arsenalized, sporterized, re-barreled, or re-chambered, yet they will still retain their federally exempt status. Even if every part except the receiver is replaced, a pre-1899 "black powder" firearm still qualifies as an antique. FFL holders have been directed not to enter Pre-1899 guns into their Bound Books.

== Record keeping ==
FFL holders are required to keep a registry of firearms sales in an ATF-approved Bound Book, or a computerized equivalent using ATF-approved software, the records are required to be stored at the business premises listed on their FFL license. Licensed dealers must also maintain file copies of Form 4473 or eForm 4473 "Firearms Transaction Record" documents, for a period of not less than 20 years after the date of sale or disposition. Following the adoption of Final Rule 2021R-05F in April 2022, which expanded the definitions for frames & receivers and added new requirements for privately manufactured firearms, FFL holders are now required to keep all physical and electronic copies of Form 4473 documents for as long as they are in business and have a valid FFL, although paper forms over 20 years of age may be stored at a separate warehouse. When retiring or otherwise relinquishing a license, these records are sent to the ATF's out-of-business Records Center. Licensed collectors are not required to send their records to the ATF when relinquishing their license. The ATF is allowed to inspect, as well as request a copy of the Form 4473 from the dealer during the course of a criminal investigation. In addition, the sale of two or more handguns to a person at the same time, or in a five business day period, must be reported to ATF and the Chief Local Law Enforcement Official (CLEO) with a Form 3310.4 "Report of Multiple Sale or Other Disposition of Pistols and Revolvers". In response to the increasing illegal movement of firearms across the Southwest border, on August 1, 2011, the ATF began requiring all licensed Type 01 dealers and Type 02 pawnbrokers located in Arizona, California, New Mexico, and Texas to report multiple sales or transfers of all semi-automatic rifles capable of accepting a detachable magazine with a caliber greater than .22 (including .223 or 5.56 mm), such as the AR-15 and AK-style rifle, by submitting ATF Form 3310.12 "Report of Multiple Sale or Other Disposition of Certain Rifles". On October 1, 2024, the ATF extended the Form 3310.12 reporting requirement to all licensed Type 07 manufacturers and Type 08 importers located in Arizona, California, New Mexico, and Texas.

=== Location Activity ===
Activity that requires an FFL, i.e. dealing, importing or manufacturing firearms or ammunition, must be conducted on the premises of the location listed on the individual's or entity's license. A business premises is defined as "the property on which the manufacturing or importing of firearms or ammunition or the dealing in firearms is or will be conducted" and does not include any private dwelling of which no part is open to the public. Exceptions where licensed business activities may occur off-premises include:

- A licensee can temporarily conduct business at a gun show, provided: the gun show is located in same State as the licensee's business; the gun show is sponsored by an organization recognized by federal, State, or local government as being dedicated to the collection, competitive use, sporting use, or other lawful use of firearms and has all appropriate state licenses & permits; is in a fixed location; and records of all sales conducted at the gun show must include the address of the show's location.
- Licensed dealers, importers, and manufacturers may engage in dealing curios and relic firearms with another licensee at any location, so long as firearms are not prohibited in that location by federal, State, or local law.

A Federal Firearms License only covers the activity permitted for the particular location or place of business specified on the license. A separate license is required for each individual place of business where firearms or ammunition are manufactured, imported, or sold. For example, if someone owns two stores where firearms are sold, they would need separate Type 01 Dealer in Firearms Other Than Destructive Devices licenses for each store; or if a corporation manufactured and sold firearms at a factory in one location, while also selling their firearms at a store located elsewhere, the company would need a Type 07 Manufacturer of Firearms Other Than Destructive Devices license for their factory, and a separate Type 01 Dealer's license for their store. Exceptions where separate licenses aren't required include:

- A separate warehouse used by the licensee solely for the storage of firearms or ammunition, so long as the appropriate records pertaining to those items are kept on the warehouse's premises;
- Licensed collectors (Type 03 Collector of Curios & Relics FFL) may deal or dispose of firearms designated as curios & relics to other licensees or persons at any location that is within the same State where the collector's license is held, unless prohibited by State or local law;
- Licensees may temporarily conduct business at a gun show.

== Conditions of application ==
ATF will approve the application if the applicant:

- Is 21 years old or older
- Is not prohibited from handling or possessing firearms or ammunition
- Has not violated the Gun Control Act or its regulations
- Has not failed to disclose information or facts in connection with his application
- Has premises for conducting business or collecting

The applicant must also certify that:

1. The business to be conducted under the license is not prohibited by state law or local law in the place where the licensed premise is located, including local (city or county) zoning ordinances and not prohibited by the local homeowners association (HOA), if any
2. Within 30 days after the application is approved, the business will comply with the requirements of state and local law applicable to the conduct of the business, i.e. having a state firearm dealer license if required by the state where the FFL will be doing business
3. That business will not be conducted under the license until the requirements of state and local law applicable to the business have been met, i.e. obtaining business license, liability insurance, payment of all applicable taxes
4. The applicant has sent or delivered a form to the Chief Law Enforcement Officer (CLEO) of the jurisdiction where the premises is located notifying the officer that the applicant intends to apply for a license. The CLEO is the Chief of Police of the local Police Department if the business is located inside city limits, if the business is located in an unincorporated or rural area the CLEO is the County Sheriff, if the business is located in a city/incorporated area that does not have a municipal police department, or an unincorporated/rural area that does not have a County Sheriff (a few states like Alaska, Connecticut, & Hawaii don't have sheriffs) the CLEO is usually the Head of the State Police (typically called a Commissioner or Superintendent) or the commanding officer (usually a Major or Captain) of the state police division (usually called a Command or Troop) that covers the area where the business is located; a District Attorney can also be a CLEO for the purposes of notification
5. Secure gun storage and safety devices are used at any place in which firearms are sold or stored

== Application fees ==
=== Non-destructive devices ===
Licensee	Application fee	Renewal fee
Manufacturer	$150 for 3 years	$150 every 3 years
Importer	$150 for 3 years	$150 every 3 years
Pawnbroker	$200 for 3 years	$90 every 3 years
Dealer	$200 for 3 years	$90 every 3 years
Collector	$30 for 3 years	$30 every 3 years

Destructive device

Licensee	Application fee	Renewal fee
Manufacturer	$3,000 for 3 years	$3,000 every 3 years
Importer	$3,000 for 3 years	$3,000 every 3 years
Dealer	$3,000 for 3 years	$3,000 every 3 years

=== Ammunition ===
Licensee	Application fee	Renewal fee
Manufacturer	$30 for 3 years	$30 every 3 years

Importers and manufacturers of machine guns, short-barreled rifles and shotguns, and destructive devices must also pay a special occupational tax of $500 per year if gross revenues do not exceed $500,000, and $1,000 if revenues exceed $500,000.

== International Traffic in Arms Regulations registration ==
International Traffic in Arms Regulations (ITAR) is a set of United States government regulations that control the manufacture, export, import, or transfer of defense-related articles and services on the United States Munitions List (USML), which includes most all firearms components.

In general, the Department of State's Directorate of Defense Trade Controls (DDTC), which interprets and enforces ITAR, requires anyone engaged in such activities, including holders of a federal firearms license, to register annually and submit a fee (no less than $2,250 as of 2013). Registration exemptions exist for, among other things, work on unclassified intellectual property, and work or fabrication of an experimental or scientific nature including research and development. As of January 23, 2020, new regulations regarding ITAR are in the works.

== See also ==
- Arms trafficking
- Bureau of Alcohol, Tobacco, Firearms, and Explosives (ATF)
- Firearm Owners Protection Act (1986)
- Form 4473
- Gun Control Act of 1968
- Gun law in the United States
- Gun show loophole
- Gun shows in the United States
- Straw purchase
