= Form 4473 =

Form filled out when purchasing a firearm in the U.S.

ATF Form 4473, October 2016 revision

A Firearms Transaction Record, or ATF Form 4473, is a seven-page form prescribed by the Bureau of Alcohol, Tobacco, Firearms and Explosives (ATF) required in the United States of America to be completed when a person proposes to purchase a firearm from a Federal Firearms License (FFL) holder, such as a gun dealer.

Form 4473 contains the purchaser's name, address, date of birth, government-issued photo ID, National Instant Criminal Background Check System (NICS) background check transaction number, and a short affidavit stating that the purchaser is eligible to purchase firearms under federal law. It also contains the make, model, or serial numbering the firearm. Lying on the form is a felony punishable by up to five years in prison in addition to fines, even if the transaction is denied by the NICS. Prosecutions are rare in the absence of a felony committed with the gun purchased. Of 556,496 denied transactions between FY 2008 and FY 2015, federal prosecutors prosecuted an average of under 32 cases per year, including 24 in FY 2013, 15 in FY 2014 and 20 in FY 2015.

If a person purchases a firearm from a private individual who is not a FFL licensed dealer, the purchaser is not required in most states to complete a Form 4473. Some states (such as California, Colorado, Nevada, New Jersey, Virginia, and Washington) require individual sellers to sell through dealers.

These forms are given the same status as a tax return under the Privacy Act of 1974 and cannot be disclosed by the government to private parties or other government officials except in accordance with the Privacy Act. Individual dealers possessing a copy of the form are not subject to the Privacy Act's restrictions on disclosure. Formerly, dealers were required to maintain completed forms for 20 years in the case of completed sales, and for 5 years where the sale was disapproved as a result of the NICS check. Beginning in August 2022, dealers were required to keep completed forms indefinitely, with the option of sending forms over 20 years in to the ATF.

== eForm 4473 ==
In response to the Government Paperwork Elimination Act (GPEA), and based upon requests from the firearms industry, the ATF has developed the e-Form 4473 to assist in the proper completion of the Federal Firearms Transaction Record (ATF Form 4473). The ATF eForm 4473 is designed to help eliminate errors in completing Form 4473 for both the firearm purchaser and the licensed seller. The eForm 4473 is provided to the public, including major retailers, free of charge via the ATF eForm web site. ATF eForm 4473 is a downloadable application that runs locally on the seller's computer and supports both Windows and Mac OS X operating systems. (See "External links" section below.)

== Acquisition and Disposition Log ==
The firearm dealer is required to record some information from the Form 4473 into a "bound-book", called an "Acquisition and Disposition Log". The dealer must keep the Form 4473 on file for the lifetime of the FFL, and is required to surrender the log book to the ATF upon retirement from the firearms business.

The ATF is allowed to inspect, as well as request a copy of, the Form 4473 from the dealer during the course of a criminal investigation. In addition, the sale of two or more handguns to a person in a five-day period must be reported to the ATF on Form 3310.4.

== Revisions ==
=== 2016 ===
In 2016, the ATF made several changes to the form, including adding a warning statement that the use of marijuana is illegal under federal law, regardless of whether it has been legalized or decriminalized for medicinal or recreational purposes in the state where the transferee/buyer resides.

=== 2020 ===
In 2020, the ATF made further changes to the form, including adding a warning that "any person who exports a firearm without a proper authorization from either the Department of Commerce or the Department of State, as applicable, is subject to a fine of not more than $1,000,000 and up to 20 years imprisonment." As of November 1, 2020, all FFL holders were required to transition to the new revision.

Additional changes made to the form include:

- Relocating questions relating to the manufacturer, importer, model, serial number, type, caliber or gauge, and number of firearms to be transferred to a new Section A at the beginning of the form. These questions were previously located in Section D.
- New options for questions relating to personal information, such as the option to select Non-binary as a Sex, the option to include an Appeals Management Database Identification (AMD ID) as a Unique Personal Identification Number, and two new immigration-based questions.
- Additional criminal history questions, relating to dealings with a military court, misdemeanor domestic violence offenses, and orders of protection.

== Convictions ==
According to the US Sentencing Commission, approximately 5,000 to 6,000 people a year are convicted of receiving or possessing a firearm against one of the prohibitions above. In 2017, over 25.2 million actual background checks were performed in total. In 2024, Hunter Biden, who had lied on a question on a 4473 form, was convicted on three gun charges by a Federal Jury.
