= Haynes v. United States =

- Supreme Court of the United States

Argued October 11, 1967 Decided January 29, 1968
- Full case name: Miles Edward Haynes v. United States
- Citations: 390 U.S. 85 (more) 88 S. Ct. 722; 19 L. Ed. 2d 923

Holding
- Haynes' conviction under § 5851 for possession of an unregistered firearm is not properly distinguishable from a conviction under § 5841 for failure to register possession of a firearm, and both offenses must be deemed subject to any constitutional deficiencies arising under the Fifth Amendment from the obligation to register.

Court membership
- Chief Justice Earl Warren Associate Justices Hugo Black · William O. Douglas; John M. Harlan II · William J. Brennan Jr. Potter Stewart · Byron White; Abe Fortas · Thurgood Marshall

Case opinions
- Majority: Harlan, joined by Black, Douglas, Brennan, Stewart, White, Fortas
- Dissent: Warren
- Marshall took no part in the consideration or decision of the case.

Laws applied
- U.S. Const. amend. V

Haynes v. United States, 390 U.S. 85 (1968), was a United States Supreme Court decision interpreting the Fifth Amendment to the United States Constitution's self-incrimination clause. Haynes extended the Fifth Amendment protections elucidated in Marchetti v. United States.

== Background of the case ==
26 U.S.C. § 5841 (which codified part of the National Firearms Act of 1934) required "the possessor of [certain kinds of firearms] to register the weapon, unless he made it or acquired it by transfer or importation, and the Act's requirements as to transfers, makings and importations 'were complied with.'" Firearms subject to the act included short barrelled shotguns, machine guns, silencers, and other kinds of firearms primarily used by criminals. At the same time, 26 U.S.C. § 5851 made it a crime to possess a firearm required to be registered under section 5841 that had not been registered.

Miles Edward Haynes had been arrested for possessing an unregistered short barrelled shotgun in 1965 and was charged under section 5851. He moved to dismiss the case, arguing that the requirements of section 5841 and 5851 constituted forced self-incrimination in violation of the Fifth Amendment, since the registration requirement under section 5841 only applied to those who had violated the National Firearms Act. The trial court overruled the motion to dismiss, after which he plead guilty and was sentenced to four years in prison. On appeal, the United States Court of Appeals for the Fifth Circuit rejected his self-incrimination argument, ruling that possession of the firearm was the crime and not failure to register. The Supreme Court granted certiorari and the case was argued in October 1967.

== Majority opinion ==
In a 7-1 decision, the Court ruled in 1968 in favor of Haynes agreeing that the statute violated the Fifth Amendment. Earl Warren dissented in a one sentence opinion, which referenced his dissent in Grosso v. United States. Thurgood Marshall did not participate in the ruling.

The majority distinguished Haynes from cases like United States v. Sullivan, in which the statute requiring reporting information at issue did not just apply to suspect groups. The majority opinion stated:

The questions propounded by § 5841, like those at issue in Albertson, supra, are "directed at a highly selective group inherently suspect of criminal activities"; they concern not "an essentially noncriminal and regulatory area of inquiry," but "an area permeated with criminal statutes." 382 U.S. at 382 U. S. 79.

As with many other 5th amendment cases, felons and others prohibited from possessing firearms could not be compelled to incriminate themselves through registration. The National Firearms Act was amended after Haynes to cure the self incrimination problem. In this new form, the registration provision was upheld in United States v. Freed (1971). The court held that "to eliminate the defects revealed by Haynes, Congress amended the Act so that only a possessor who lawfully makes, manufactures, or imports firearms can and must register them." The original Haynes decision continues to block state prosecutions of criminals who fail to register guns as required by various state law gun registration schemes.
