= Silencer Shop Foundation v. ATF =

2026 U.S. district court case

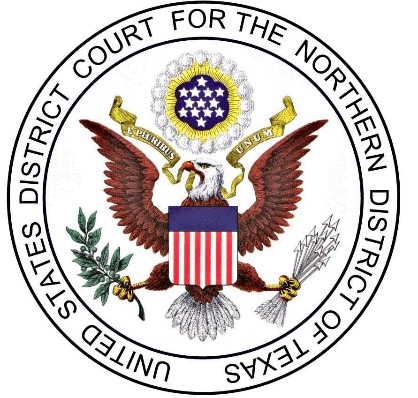
- Court: United States District Court for the Northern District of Texas
- Full case name: Silencer Shop Foundation, et al. v. Bureau of Alcohol, Tobacco, Firearms and Explosives, et al.
- Decided: August 5, 2026
- Docket nos.: 6:25-cv-00056-H

Case history
- Related actions: Jensen v. ATF, No. 6:26-cv-227

Holding
- Provisions of the National Firearms Act that require approval and registration for untaxed firearms exceed Congress's enumerated powers. Permanent injunction granted for the plaintiffs, their members and their customers.

Court membership
- Judge sitting: James Wesley Hendrix

Silencer Shop Foundation v. ATF is a 2026 decision of the United States District Court for the Northern District of Texas. On August 5, 2026, Judge James Wesley Hendrix ruled that parts of the National Firearms Act (NFA) exceed Congress's powers. The ruling covers the parts that require approval and registration for short-barreled rifles, short-barreled shotguns, silencers and certain other firearms. Congress ended the tax on those firearms in 2025. Hendrix ruled that, without that tax, the taxing power could no longer justify the registration rules. The Department of Justice did not appeal.

== Background ==
Congress passed the National Firearms Act in 1934 as a tax on making and transferring certain firearms. The law added registration and approval rules to help collect the tax. President Donald Trump signed the One Big Beautiful Bill Act on July 4, 2025. It ended the making and transfer tax for short-barreled shotguns, short-barreled rifles and silencers. The tax also ended for the NFA group called "any other weapons," but not for machine guns and destructive devices. That same day, the Silencer Shop Foundation and other plaintiffs filed suit.

== District court decision ==
Hendrix wrote that Congress enacted the challenged provisions only under the taxing power. He added that an untaxed firearm produces no revenue, so the provisions have no tax left to support. At the plaintiffs' invitation, Hendrix did not decide their Second Amendment claims. The ruling enjoined the Department of Justice and the Bureau of Alcohol, Tobacco, Firearms and Explosives (ATF) from enforcing the provisions. His injunction covered the plaintiffs' current members, future members and customers. Hendrix denied declaratory relief and stayed his order for seven days. When the stay ended without an appeal, the order took effect.

== Aftermath ==
On September 24, 2026, Solicitor General D. John Sauer wrote to Chuck Grassley, the chair of the Senate Judiciary Committee. Sauer said the Department of Justice had decided not to appeal. On October 9, 2026, ATF issued guidance about the NFA's approval, registration and tax-stamp requirements. Under the guidance, ATF would not enforce those requirements for short-barreled rifles, short-barreled shotguns, silencers and "any other weapons." The Attorney General decided to apply the policy to everyone, not only to those covered by the injunction. The guidance did not change state and local laws, or the Gun Control Act's dealer requirements and background checks.
