= United States v. Thompson-Center Arms Co. =

United States v. Thompson-Center Arms Company
- Supreme Court of the United States

Argued January 13, 1992 Decided June 8, 1992
- Full case name: United States v. Thompson-Center Arms Company
- Citations: 504 U.S. 505 (more) 112 S. Ct. 2102; 119 L. Ed. 2d 308; 1992 U.S. LEXIS 3391; 60 U.S.L.W. 4480; 69 A.F.T.R.2d (RIA) 1493; 92 Cal. Daily Op. Service 4793; 92 Daily Journal DAR 7605; 6 Fla. L. Weekly Fed. S 346

Case history
- Prior: Thompson/Ctr. Arms Co. v. United States, 19 Cl. Ct. 725 (1990); reversed, 924 F.2d 1041 (Fed. Cir. 1991); cert. granted, 502 U.S. 807 (1991).

Holding
- The Court held that the carbine conversion kit did not constitute a short barreled rifle, primarily because the kit contained both the stock and the 16-inch barrel.

Court membership
- Chief Justice William Rehnquist Associate Justices Byron White · Harry Blackmun; John P. Stevens · Sandra Day O'Connor; Antonin Scalia · Anthony Kennedy; David Souter · Clarence Thomas

Case opinions
- Plurality: Souter, joined by Rehnquist, O'Connor
- Concurrence: Scalia (in judgment), joined by Thomas
- Dissent: White, joined by Blackmun, Stevens, Kennedy
- Dissent: Stevens

Laws applied
- National Firearms Act

United States v. Thompson-Center Arms Company, 504 U.S. 505 (1992), was a case decided by the Supreme Court of the United States.

== Background ==
The legal dispute in United States v. Thompson-Center Arms Company arose when officials from the U.S. Bureau of Alcohol, Tobacco, and Firearms contacted Thompson Center Arms informing them that the kit of the Contender Pistol that included a stock and a 16-inch (410 mm) barrel constituted a short-barreled rifle under the National Firearms Act.

== Arguments ==
The U.S. Government's argument centered on the analogy of a disassembled bicycle still being a bicycle.

Stephen Halbrook argued on behalf of Thompson Center Arms and stated that the weapon would have to be assembled with both the stock and the 10-inch (250 mm) barrel attached for it to be a short-barreled rifle.

== Decision ==
The court ruled in Thompson Center Arms' favor in that the carbine conversion kit did not constitute a short-barreled rifle, primarily because the kit contained both the stock and the 16-inch barrel.

Justice Scalia also noted that there is a warning carved on the stock telling the user to not attach the stock to the receiver when the 10-inch barrel is attached to the receiver or vice versa.

This circumstance caused the court to apply the rule of lenity since the NFA carries criminal penalties with it. This meant that ambiguous statutes are interpreted against the government.

== See also ==
- Staples v. United States, illegal possession of a machine gun under U.S. federal law
- List of United States Supreme Court cases, volume 504
- List of United States Supreme Court cases
- Lists of United States Supreme Court cases by volume
- List of United States Supreme Court cases by the Rehnquist Court
