= Thompson Center =

Thompson Center may refer to:

- James R. Thompson Center, an office building in Chicago, Illinois
- Thompson Center Arms, an American firearms company
