= Hale v. Committee on Character and Fitness for the State of Illinois =

Hale v. Committee on Character and Fitness
- No. 14-2386
- Court: United States Court of Appeals for the Seventh Circuit
- Full case name: Matthew F. Hale, Plaintiff-Appellant, v. Committee on Character and Fitness for the State of Illinois, et al., Defendants-Appellees.
- Decided: July 14, 2003

Court membership
- Judges sitting: Diane P. Wood; Joel Flaum; William J. Bauer

Hale v. Committee on Character and Fitness for the State of Illinois, 335 F.3d 678 (7th Cir. 2003), was a decision made by the United States Court of Appeals for the Seventh Circuit in which the court refused on procedural grounds to disturb the Illinois Committee on Character of Fitness's denial of a license to practice law to Matthew F. Hale, on the ground that he lacked the moral character and fitness to practice law.

The committee denied Hale's application on December 16, 1998, and refused again after an appeal on June 30, 1999, citing his antisemitic and racist views were "Inconsistent with the letter and spirit of the Rules of Professional Conduct," regardless of his stated intentions to uphold the state's values. After his petition to the Illinois Supreme Court was denied, Hale then filed a case in federal court against the Board of Admissions to the Bar, the Third District Committee, members of the Hearing Panel, and the Illinois Supreme Court. The United States Court of Appeals for the Seventh Circuit, citing the Rooker-Feldman doctrine, concluded that Hale did in fact have an opportunity to litigate his challenges to the Illinois Supreme Court's ruling, and subsequently dismissed his case.

== Background ==
Matthew Hale was a former Bradley University student who was expelled for posting flyers inviting students to attend White Supremacy meetings without permission from the university. The KKK protested outside the university. Hale was later readmitted to Bradley University after writing a letter of apology and proclaiming he had changed. He graduated from Bradley University. Hale later formed the New Church of the Creator, which believes that "the white race are the creators of all worthwhile civilization," and encourages a "racial holy war." Hale later attended and graduated from Southern Illinois University School of Law, and passed the bar exam in that same year.

Hale then applied for a license to practice law in the state of Illinois. He was open about his racist and antisemitic views within his law application, but also stated that these views would not get in the way of him practicing law. Despite these claims Hale's application was rejected based on the committees findings that he "did not satisfy his burden of proving that he possessed the requisite character and fitness on several findings." and that his past actions and current views would likely lead him to actions inconsistent with the bar

== Illinois Supreme Court case ==
Immediately after his rejection, Hale petitioned the Illinois Supreme Court to reconsider his application, and questioned the constitutionality of rejecting his application based on a set of beliefs he held, citing the First Amendment. The Supreme Court denied his petition.

Justice James D. Heiple was the sole dissenting justice on the Illinois Supreme Court, writing in his dissenting opinion that the court was "speculating" about Hale's potential future actions, and argued for review to determine whether a law license may be denied based "on predictions of future actionable misconduct." The court of appeals pointed out that Heiple's dissent "does not reflect the state of the law," and is not binding.

== U.S. Court of Appeals for the Seventh Circuit decision ==
After the Supreme Court dismissed Hale's petition, Hale filed a case against the admissions board, the Third District Committee, members of the Hearing Panel, and the Illinois Supreme Court, feeling he did not receive proper judicial proceedings regarding the denial of his bar application and the perceived infringement upon his free speech rights. Hale cited 42 U.S.C. § 1983, which provides that "Every person who, under color of any statute, ordinance, regulation, custom, or usage, of any State ... subjects, or causes to be subjected, any citizen of the United States ... to the deprivation of any rights, privileges, or immunities secured by the Constitution and laws, shall be liable to the party injured in an action at law."

On July 14, 2003, the Seventh Circuit Court of Appeals issued its decision. The court rejected Hale's argument, citing the Rooker-Feldman doctrine, which states that federal courts "should not sit in direct review of state court decisions," and the question became whether the Supreme Court's allowance of Hale's application's rejection counted as judicial proceedings, and whether he had a chance to litigate his case in front of them. The court also held that the First Amendment did not guarantee him the right to incite racial discrimination as an "officer of the court." They also stated that he had a fair chance to litigate his case with the Supreme Court, and that he was denied anyway. They also stated that the Rooker-Feldman doctrine did not allow them to review the decision of the Illinois Supreme Court.

== Scholarly assessment ==
The case called scholarly attention and debate about the ramifications of denying admission to the bar to applicants with objectionable views, in light of the Supreme Court's 1971 decision in Baird v. State Bar of Arizona, which held that the "freedom of association guaranteed by the First Amendment prevents a state from excluding a person from a profession solely because of the applicant's beliefs."

Some commentators viewed the decisions as a mistake. Jason Billy, writing in Harvard BlackLetter Law Journal, noted that "the In re Hale decision has left unanswered many residual free-speech questions. One can easily imagine other scenarios wherein a bar association is confronted with an applicant with a spotless academic record, who is lacking evidence of any criminality, yet who openly espouses racist beliefs." Billy argued that minority groups are "far better served by a system within which bar associations do not paternalistically protect such groups from the private racism of lawyers: where members of the bar are not punished for their candor with regard to racial politics, minority groups may in fact increase their social, political, and economic savvy by fully and autonomously participating in the legal market without the viewpoint-based gate-keeping of bar authorities."

Matthew Stevenson wrote in the Montana Law Review that "Hale's imperfect record, standing alone, does not meet the cumulative standard by which applicants have traditionally been denied. Illinois committee members blended Hale's imperfect record with their personal repugnance at his political views to conjure up a formula worthy of their dismissal. Yet their repugnance should have played no role in the decision." Stevenson wrote that Hale's sworn claim that he would uphold the law should have been accepted: "The fallback position for the state is their right to disbar an applicant if his oath proves to be insincere, not to deny him on a hunch that the oath will be broken."

== Later developments ==
Two days after Hale's application was denied a member of his church went on a shooting spree, killing two and injuring 9. Hale stated after that his church "does not condone illegal activities." On April 6, 2005, Hale was convicted and sentenced to 40 years in prison for attempting to solicit the murder of Judge Joan Lefkow.
