= Thompson/Center Arms =

Firearms manufacturer

Thompson/Center Arms Inc
- Industry: Firearms
- Founded: 1965; 61 years ago
- Founder: K. W. Thompson Tool & Warren Center
- Headquarters: Rochester, New Hampshire, U.S.
- Products: rifles, pistols
- Website: http://www.tcarms.com/

Thompson/Center Arms is an American firearms company based in Rochester, New Hampshire. The company was best known for its line of interchangeable-barrel, single-shot pistols and rifles. Thompson/Center also manufactures muzzle-loading rifles and was credited with creating the resurgence of their use in the 1970s.

== History ==
In the 1960s, Warren Center developed an unusual break-action, single-shot pistol in his basement workshop that later became known as the Contender. Meanwhile, the K.W. Thompson Tool Company had been searching for a product to manufacture year-round. In 1965, Warren Center joined the K.W. Thompson Tool Company, and together, they announced Warren Center's Contender pistol in 1967. Although it sold for more than comparable hunting revolvers, the flexibility of being able to shoot multiple calibers by simply changing out the barrel and sights and its higher accuracy soon made it popular with handgun hunters. As K.W. Thompson Tool began marketing Center's Contender pistol, the company name was changed to Thompson/Center Arms Company. Then, in 1970, Thompson/Center created the modern black powder industry, introducing Warren Center's Hawken-styled black powder muzzle-loader rifle.

On January 4, 2007, Thompson/Center was purchased by S&W. On December 8, 2010, Smith & Wesson announced that the original Rochester, New Hampshire, plant would be closed and manufacturing was transferred to Springfield, Massachusetts. Following the closure of Thompson/Center arms in Rochester, New Hampshire, Thompson Investment Casting opened in the same town continuing production of metal products for various companies including Smith & Wesson.

Smith & Wesson announced in May 2021 that the Thompson/Center subsidiary was being phased out. Gregg Ritz, who owned Thompson/Center prior to the Smith & Wesson acquisition, announced in May 2024 that he had bought back the company from S&W and would be moving production back to Rochester, NH.

== Break-action pistols ==
Thompson/Center's success came with the emergence of long range handgun hunting, target shooting, and, especially, metallic silhouette shooting. Their break-action, single-shot design brought rifle-like accuracy and power in a handgun, which was a new concept at the time. Originally designed only for interchangeable barrels in .38 Special and .22 LR, subsequent handgun developments by Thompson/Center led to a wider range of interchangeable barrels for use with many more cartridges. Opening and closing the break-open action is accomplished by squeezing the outside bottom of the trigger guard toward the grip/buttstock, at which time the action opens, and an extractor manually extracts the cartridge.

=== Contender ===
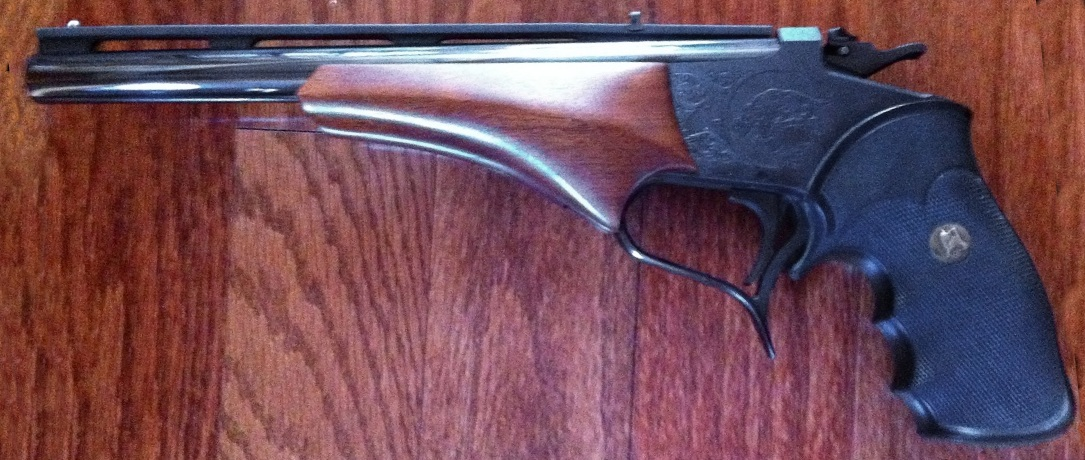
Contender in 45 Colt/.410 with ventilated rib

The Contender, first introduced in 1967, is a break-action, single-shot pistol or rifle with a number of unique features. The first unique feature is the way the barrel is attached to the frame. By removing the fore-end, a large hinge pin is exposed; by pushing this hinge pin out, the barrel can be removed. Since the sights and extractor remain attached to the barrel in the Contender design, the frame itself contains no cartridge-specific features. A barrel of another caliber can be installed and pinned in place, the fore-end replaced, and the pistol is ready to shoot with a different barrel and pre-aligned sights. This allowed for easy changes of calibers, sights, and barrel lengths, with only a flat screwdriver being required for change-out.

=== Encore ===
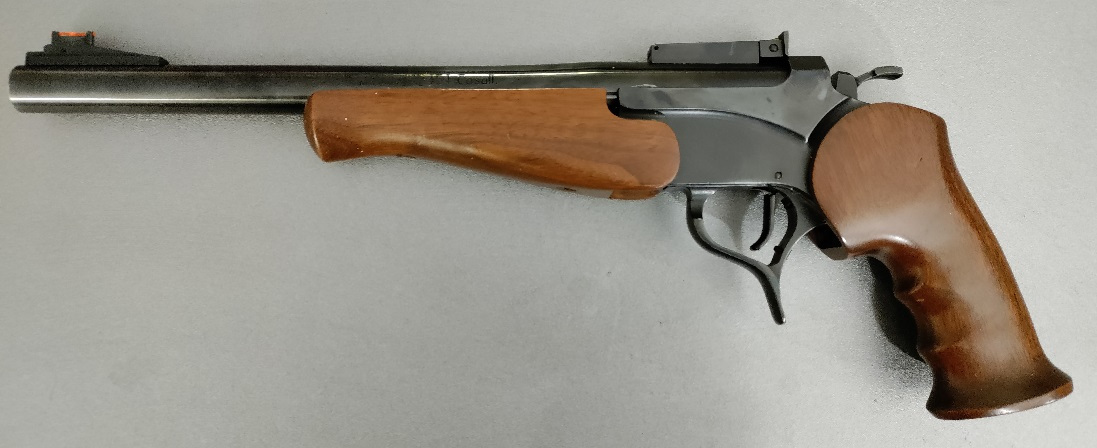
Thompson Center Encore Pistol in .454 Casull

The Encore was released in 1998. The Encore uses a different trigger mechanism, designed to be stronger than the original Contender's and to make the break-action easier to open. The Encore uses a considerably larger and stronger frame than the Contender, and accordingly, is found in over 86 cartridges - ranging from .22 Hornet to the huge .416 Rigby. There has even been one pistol-length stainless barrel made in .600 Nitro Express. The Encore barrel list also includes shotgun barrels in 28, 20, and 12 gauge, and muzzleloading barrels in .45, .50 caliber, and 12 gauge using #209 shotgun primers. In 2007, Encore rimfire barrels became available in 22 LR and 17 HMR, featuring a unique monoblock design that required no alteration to the frame assembly.

An upgraded Encore is called the Pro Hunter which generally includes stocks with rubber "Flex Tech" inserts and are stainless or carbon steel with weather shielding. There are other slight differences among the rifles including the breech plug on muzzleloader versions.

=== Contender G2 ===
The original Contender, now known as the generation one (G1) Contender, was replaced by the G2 Contender soon after the Encore came out. The G2 Contender is essentially dimensionally the same as the original Contender, but uses an Encore style trigger group. Due to the changes in the trigger mechanism, and to differences in the angle of the grip relative to the boreline of the gun, the buttstocks and pistol grips are different between the G1 and G2 Contenders and will not interchange. The G2, though, uses essentially the same barrels and fore-ends as the original Contender and barrels will interchange, with the only two exceptions being the G2 muzzleloading barrels, which will only fit the G2 frame, and the Herrett barrels/fore-ends, which are specific for use only on a G1 frame.

Unlike the original Contender, dry-firing of the G2 Contender is possible only in the center (safe) hammer position, located on the hammer between the centerfire and rimfire positions. Also, unlike the original Contender, the break-action does not need to be opened/closed (cycled) to practice dry-firing, provided the hammer is lowered between dry firing "shots". The adjustability of G2 Contender triggers is also slightly different from the original G1 Contender.

=== General legalities ===
The receiver on a Contender, whether G1 or G2, is the portion of the combined grip/buttstock assembly containing the trigger mechanism, and this is legally considered the serial-numbered gun. Hence, barrels with iron or telescopic sights, and even the hinge pin, are all simply gun parts, with no serial numbers, making the choice of changing cartridges from a multitude of rimfire, centerfire rifle and pistol cartridges, and even shotgun shells, very simple.

It is possible to fit a shoulder stock on a pistol frame in place of a pistol grip, and, when combined with a 16" or longer barrel (see "Thompson/Center Arms and the Supreme Court" below), a Contender may be legally converted from a pistol to a rifle or reversed. Although it is technically possible to fit a pistol grip on an original Contender rifle frame, and use a pistol barrel to convert it from being a rifle to a pistol, this is not legal in the US, being an illegal creation of a pistol from a rifle. In order to be able to go back and forth, the receiver must have been originally sold as a pistol, per ATF rules.

==== California Legalities ====
See Gun laws in California

- Possession of a Thompson/Center Arms .45/.410 pistol barrel is illegal in California, for both dealers and individuals, and such a barrel may not legally be shipped into the state, or even taken into California for a hunting trip, by reason of it being classified as a short barreled shotgun (SBSG) when used with a Contender receiver.

== Muzzleloading rifles ==
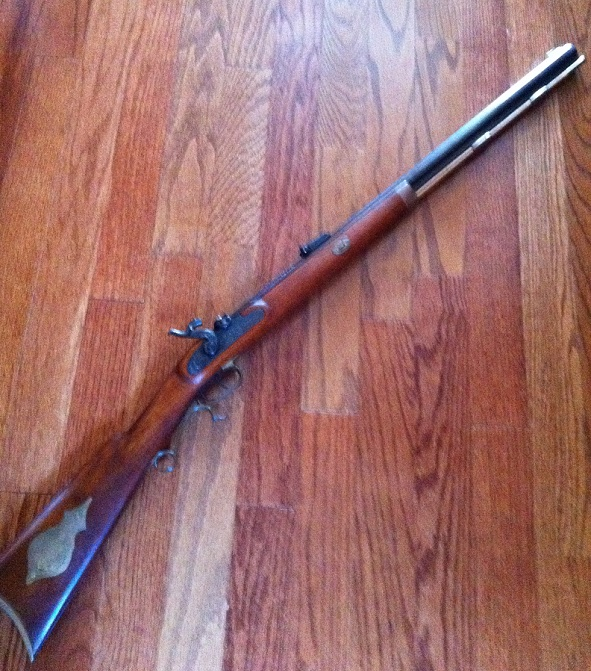
TC Hawken percussion rifle

Thompson/Center manufactures a variety of muzzleloading rifles of both traditional and inline designs, and sells percussion and flintlock rifles in a wide variety of bore diameters. Some of the better-known models are the Renegade, the Hawken, the Big Boar, and the White Mountain.

The traditional Thompson/Center muzzleloaders are largely responsible for the resurgence of black powder hunting that began in the U.S. in 1970 when Warren Center designed the firm's Hawken-styled rifle. Thompson/Center's reintroduced Hawken-styled rifle with solid brass hardware and an American walnut stock, styled in large part on "plains rifles" made by Hawken in the 1800s, has become one of the most-copied firearms designs in history. Thompson/Center produced these rifles in the following models and calibers:

Cherokee: Barrel: 24” octagonal, twist: 1:30 (32) & 1:48 (36 & 45), Trigger: double set, Caliber: 32, 36 & 45, Stock: American Walnut, Status: discontinued 1994, Ignition: percussion

Seneca: Barrel: 27” octagonal, twist: 1:30 (32) & 1:48 (36 & 45), Trigger: double set, Caliber: 32, 36 & 45, Stock: American Walnut, Status: discontinued 1987, Ignition: percussion

Hawken: Barrel: 28” octagonal, twist: 1:48, except 1:66 on 50 cal deep button rifling, Trigger: double set, Caliber: 45, 50 & 54, Stock: American Walnut, Status: 45 & 54 discontinued, 50 discontinued, many special editions, Ignition: flint & percussion

Cougar: Special edition of the Hawken, satin finish barrel, stainless furniture, highly figured wood

Renegade: Barrel: 26” octagonal, 1:38 (50), 1:48 (50 & 54), 1: 66 (50 deep button rifling), smoothbore (56), Trigger: double set, Caliber: 50, 54 & 56, Stock: American Walnut, Status: discontinued, Ignition: flintlock & percussion

New Englander Barrel: 24" round, 1:48 Trigger: single, Calibers: .50, .54, and 12 Gauge Stock: American Walnut or black synthetic Ignition: percussion Status: discontinued

White Mountain Carbine Barrel: 21" octagon to round, various twist rates Trigger: single Calibers .45, .50. 54 Stock: American Walnut or black synthetic Ignition: Percussion, Status: discontinued

Greyhawk Barrel 20" round, Stainless 1:48 Trigger: single Calibers: .50, .54 Stock: black synthetic Ignition: Percussion, Status: discontinued

Big Boar: Barrel: 26” octagonal, 1:48, Trigger: single, Caliber: 58, Stock: American Walnut, Status: discontinued, Ignition: percussion

Encore 209x50: A modern design muzzleloader that can interchange with centerfire barrels. Based on a single-shot, break-action, the 209x50 is capable of "minute of angle" accuracy. The 209x50 can handle charges of up to 150 grains (9.7 g) of black powder or Pyrodex equivalent. Using a 26" barrel and a 250-grain (16 g) bullet with 3 Pyrodex Pellets, it produces a muzzle velocity of 2203 ft./second.

G2 Contender: A modern design muzzleloader which accepts magnum charges for long range shooting. Charges of up to 150 grains (9.7 g) of FFG Black Powder or three (3) 50-grain Pyrodex Pellets produce velocities of approximately 2,400 ft/s (730 m/s) at the muzzle.

Omega: This T/C muzzleloader was offered in several barrel lengths and in calibers .45 and .50. It can handle 150 grains (9.7 g) of Black Powder or Pyrodex equivalent, or three 50-grain (3.2 g) Pyrodex pellets. Its breech plug design allows it to burn different types of black powder substitutes very efficiently.

Triumph: This T/C muzzleloader comes in .50 cal. with a 28" barrel and composite stock.

== Muzzleloading pistols ==
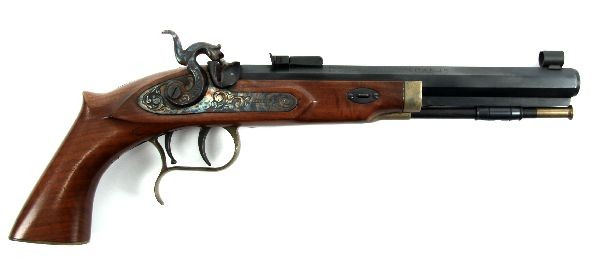
Thompson/Center Patriot Black Powder Muzzleloader Pistol chambered in .45.

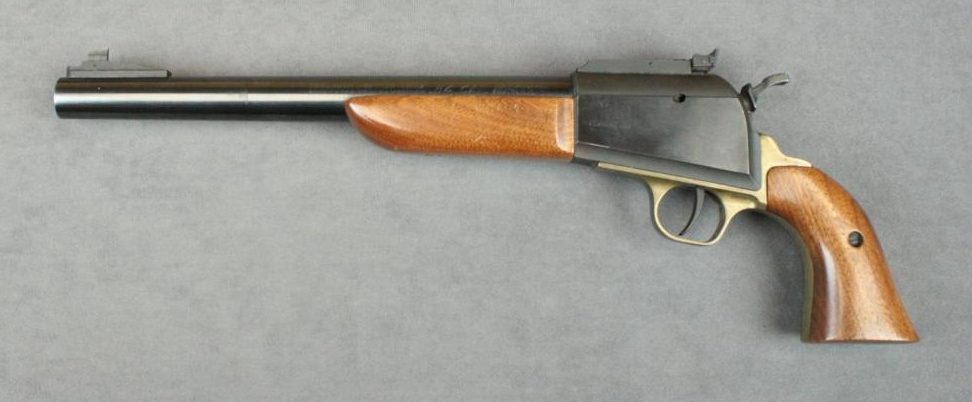
Thompson/Center Scout Black Powder Muzzleloader Pistol chambered in .54.

Patriot: Barrel: 9” octagonal, Trigger: double set, Caliber: .36 & .45, Stock: American Walnut, Status: discontinued 1997, Ignition: percussion.

Scout: Barrel: 15” round, Trigger: single set, Caliber: 45, 50 & 54, Stock: American Walnut, Status: discontinued 199?, Ignition: percussion.

A major factory fire at the Thompson/Center factory in 1996 destroyed all tooling and parts for the Scout and Patriot pistols and the Seneca rifle. As a result, they were discontinued for sale.

== Bolt action rifles ==
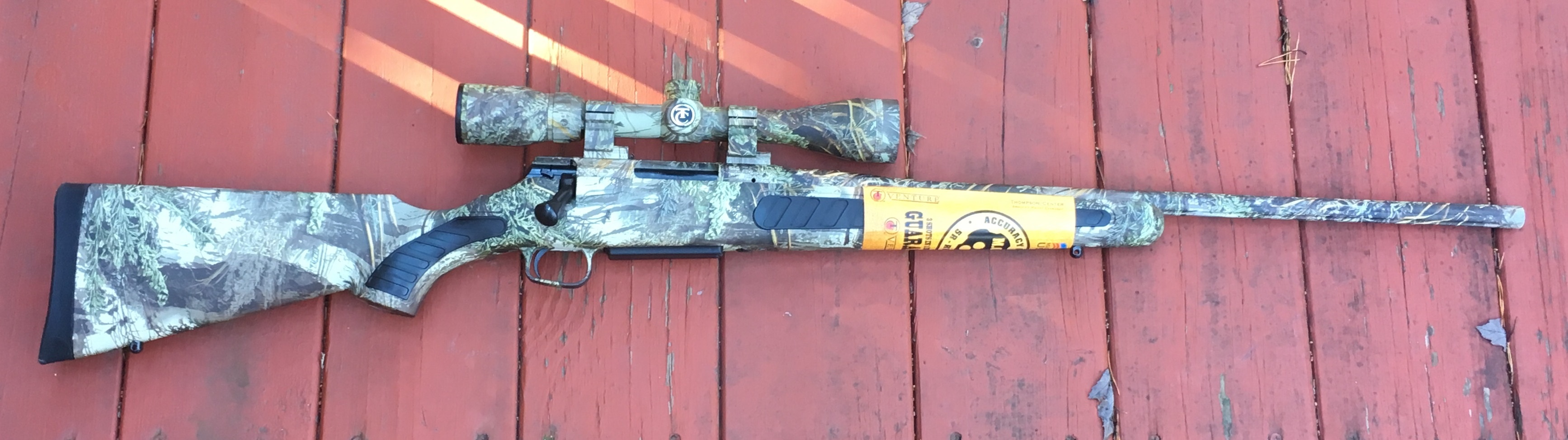
A T/C Venture Predator in Real Tree camouflage

Compass
Barrel: 22", 24"
Trigger: Single stage, adjustable
Caliber: .204 Ruger, .22-250 Remington, .223 Remington, .243 Winchester, .270 Winchester, .280 Remington, .300 Winchester Short Magnum, .300 Winchester Magnum, .308 Winchester, 6.5mm Creedmoor, .30-06 Springfield, 7mm Remington Magnum, and 7mm-08 Remington
Stock: Polymer
Status: In production

Venture
Barrel: 22", 24"
Trigger: Single stage, adjustable
Caliber: .204 Ruger, .22-250 Remington, .223 Remington, .243 Winchester, .25-06 Remington, .270 Winchester, .270 Winchester Short Magnum, .280 Remington, .300 Winchester Short Magnum, .300 Winchester Magnum, .308 Winchester, .338 Winchester Magnum, .30-06 Springfield, 7mm Remington Magnum, and 7mm-08 Remington
Variants: Blued, Weather Shield, Predator, Compact
Stock: Polymer
Status: In production

== Thompson/Center Arms and the Supreme Court ==
In the case of United States v. Thompson/Center Arms Co. (1992), the U.S. Supreme Court ruled in the company's favor by deciding that the rifle conversion kit that Thompson sold for their pistols did not constitute a short-barreled rifle under the National Firearms Act of 1934.

The Bureau of Alcohol, Tobacco, and Firearms contended that the mere possession of a pistol having a barrel less than 16 inches (410 millimetres) long, a shoulder stock, and a rifle-length (more than 16 inches (410 millimetres)) barrel constituted constructive intent to "make" an illegal short-barreled rifle (SBR) (by combining the pistol's frame, the pistol-length barrel, and the shoulder stock) even if the shoulder stock was intended to be used only with the rifle-length barrel.

The Supreme Court disagreed and its decision clarified the meaning of the term "make" in the National Firearms Act by stating that the mere possession of components that theoretically could be assembled in an illegal configuration was not in itself a violation as long as the components could also be assembled into a legal configuration.

One argument raised was the example of ammonium nitrate fertilizer and Diesel oil, which can very often be found together in a farmer's possession (fertilizer for the crops and fuel for the tractor). Both are lawful, and while they can easily be assembled into the blasting agent known as ANFO, possession of both has never been held to imply (without other evidence) that a farmer was "making" explosives.
