= National Firearms Act =

1934 US law regulating firearms including machine guns

- Long title: An Act to provide for the taxation of manufacturers, importers, and dealers in certain firearms and machine guns, to tax the sale or other disposal of such weapons, and to restrict importation and regulate interstate transportation thereof.
- Acronyms (colloquial): NFA
- Nicknames: National Firearms Act of 1934
- Enacted by: the 73rd United States Congress
- Effective: July 26, 1934

Citations
- Public law: Pub. L. 73–474
- Statutes at Large: 48 Stat. 1236

Codification
- Titles amended: 26 U.S.C.: Internal Revenue Code
- U.S.C. sections created: I.R.C. ch. 53 § 5801 et seq.

Legislative history
- Introduced in the House as H.R. 9741 by Robert L. Doughton (D–NC) on May 28, 1934; Committee consideration by House Ways and Means, Senate Finance; Passed the House on June 13, 1934 (Passed); Passed the Senate on June 18, 1934 (Passed); Signed into law by President Franklin D. Roosevelt on June 26, 1934

United States Supreme Court cases
- Sonzinsky v. United States, 300 U.S. 506 (1937); United States v. Miller, 307 U.S. 174 (1939); Haynes v. United States, 390 U.S. 85 (1968); United States v. Freed, 401 U.S. 601 (1971); United States v. Thompson-Center Arms Co., 504 U.S. 505 (1992); Staples v. United States, 511 U.S. 600 (1994); Garland v. Cargill, No. 22-976, 602 U.S. ___ (2024)

The National Firearms Act (NFA), 73rd Congress, Sess. 2, ch. 757, 48 Stat. 1236 was enacted on June 26, 1934, and currently codified and amended as I.R.C. ch. 53. The law is an Act of Congress in the United States that, in general, imposes an excise tax on the manufacture and transfer of certain firearms and mandates the registration of those firearms. The NFA is also referred to as Title II of the federal firearms laws, with the Gun Control Act of 1968 ("GCA") as Title I.

All transfers of ownership of registered NFA firearms must be done through the National Firearms Registration and Transfer Record (the "NFA registry"). The NFA also requires that the permanent transport of NFA firearms across state lines by the owner must be reported to the Bureau of Alcohol, Tobacco, Firearms and Explosives (ATF). Temporary transports of some items, most notably suppressors (also referred to as silencers), do not need to be reported.

== Background ==
The ostensible impetus for the National Firearms Act of 1934 was the gangland crime of the Prohibition era, including the St. Valentine's Day Massacre in 1929, and the attempted assassination of President-elect Franklin D. Roosevelt in 1933. Like the current National Firearms Act (NFA), the 1934 Act required NFA firearms to be registered and taxed. The $200 tax was quite prohibitive at the time (equivalent to $4,813 in 2025). According to a proponent of the Act, "We certainly don’t expect gangsters to come forward to register their weapons and be fingerprinted, and a $200 tax is frankly prohibitive to private citizens." Initial compliance with the law was mixed. The tax on silencers, short-barreled shotguns, short-barreled rifles, and AOWs was reduced to $0 on January 1, 2026.

Originally, pistols and revolvers were to be regulated as strictly as machine guns; towards that end, cutting down a rifle or shotgun to circumvent the handgun restrictions by making a concealable weapon was taxed as strictly as a machine gun. Conventional pistols and revolvers were ultimately excluded from the Act before passage, but other concealable weapons were not. Regarding the definition of "firearm", the language of the statute as originally enacted was as follows:

The term "firearm" means a shotgun or rifle having a barrel of less than eighteen inches in length, or any other weapon, except a pistol or revolver, from which a shot is discharged by an explosive if such weapon is capable of being concealed on the person, or a machine gun, and includes a muffler or silencer for any firearm whether or not such firearm is included within the foregoing definition.

Under the original Act, NFA weapons were machine guns, short-barreled rifles (SBR), short-barreled shotguns (SBS), any other weapons (AOW, i.e., concealable weapons other than pistols or revolvers), and silencers for any type of NFA or non-NFA weapon.

NFA categories have been modified by laws passed by Congress, rulings by the Department of the Treasury, and regulations promulgated by the enforcement agency assigned, known as the Bureau of Alcohol, Tobacco, Firearms and Explosives or ATF.

== Categories of regulated firearms ==
The current National Firearms Act (NFA) defines a number of categories of regulated firearms. These weapons are collectively known as NFA firearms and include the following:

Machine guns
"any weapon which shoots, is designed to shoot, or can be readily restored to shoot, automatically more than one shot, without manual reloading, by a single function of the trigger. The term shall also include the frame or receiver of any such weapon, any part designed and intended solely and exclusively, or combination of parts designed and intended, for use in converting a weapon into a machinegun, and any combination of parts from which a machinegun can be assembled if such parts are in the possession or under the control of a person."

Short-barreled rifles (SBRs)
Includes any firearm with a buttstock and either a rifled barrel less than 16″ long or an overall length under 26". The overall length is measured with any folding or collapsing stocks in the extended position. The category also includes firearms which came from the factory with a buttstock that was later removed by a third party.

Short-barreled shotguns (SBSs)
Similarly to SBRs, but with either a smoothbore barrel less than 18″ long or a minimum overall length under 26".

Suppressors
The legal term for a suppressor is silencer, and includes any portable device designed to muffle or disguise the report of a portable firearm, but does not include non-portable devices, such as sound traps used by gunsmiths in their shops which are large and usually bolted to the floor.

Destructive devices (DDs) – (added to the NFA of 1934 by the Omnibus Crime Control and Safe Streets Act of 1968)
There are two broad classes of destructive devices:
- Devices such as grenades, bombs, explosive missiles, poison gas weapons, etc.
- Any firearm with a bore over 0.50 inch except for shotguns or shotgun shells which have been found to be generally recognized as particularly suitable for sporting purposes. (Many firearms with bores over 0.50 inch, such as 10-gauge or 12-gauge shotguns, are exempted from the law because they have been determined to have a "legitimate sporting use".)

=== Any other weapon (AOW) ===
Firearms meeting the definition of "any other weapon", or AOW, are weapons or devices that can be concealed on the person and from which a shot can be discharged by the energy of an explosive. Many AOWs are disguised devices such as pens, cigarette lighters, knives, cane guns, and umbrella guns. AOWs can be pistols and revolvers with smooth bore barrels (e.g., H&R Handy-Gun, Serbu Super-Shorty) designed or redesigned to fire a fixed shotgun shell. While the above weapons are similar in appearance to weapons made from shotguns, they were originally manufactured in the described configuration rather than modified from existing shotguns. As a result, such weapons do not fit within the definition of shotgun or weapons made from a shotgun.

The AOW definition includes specifically described weapons with combination shotgun and rifle barrels 12 inches or more but less than 18 inches in length from which only a single discharge can be made from either barrel without manual reloading.

The ATF Firearms Technology Branch has issued opinions that when a pistol (such as an AR-type pistol) under 26" in overall length is fitted with a vertical fore-grip, it is no longer "designed, made and intended to fire ... when held in one hand," and therefore no longer meets the definition of a pistol. Such a firearm then falls only within the definition of "any other weapon" under the NFA.

In 1938, Congress recognized that the Marble Game Getter, a short .22/.410 sporting firearm, had "legitimate use" and did not deserve the stigma of a "gangster weapon" and reduced the $200 tax to one dollar for the Game Getter. In 1960 Congress changed the transfer tax for all AOW category firearms to $5. The transfer tax for machine guns, silencers, SBR and SBS remained at $200.

=== Parts associated with NFA items ===
In general, certain components that make up an NFA item are considered as regulated. For example, the components of a silencer are considered as "silencers" by themselves and the replacement parts are regulated. However, the repair of original parts without replacement can be done by the original manufacturer, FFL gunsmith, or by the registered owner without being subjected to new registration as long as the serial number and the dimension (caliber) are maintained. The length may be reduced in repair, but cannot be increased. Increasing the length is considered as making a new silencer. "Suppressor" is the term used within the trade/industry literature while the term "silencer" is the commonly used term that appears in the actual wording of the NFA. The terms are often used interchangeably depending on the source quoted.

Suppressors and machine guns are the most heavily regulated. For example, in Ruling 81-4, ATF declared that any AR-15 Drop-in Auto-Sear (DIAS) made after November 1, 1981, is itself a machine gun, and is therefore subject to regulation. While this might seem to mean that pre-1981 sears are legal to possess without registration, ATF closes this loophole in other publications, stating,

Regardless of the date of manufacture of a drop in auto sear, possession of such a sear and certain M-16 fire control parts is possession of a machine gun as defined by the NFA. Specifically, these parts are listed as "(a) combination(s) of parts" designed "Solely and exclusively" for use in converting a weapon into a machine gun and are a machine gun as defined in the NFA.

ATF machine gun technology letters written between 1980 and 1996 by Edward M. Owen—the then-chief of the ATF technology division defined "solely and exclusively" in all of his published and unpublished machine gun rulings with specific non-ambiguous language.

Owning for the parts needed to assemble other NFA firearms is generally restricted. One individual cannot own or manufacture certain machine gun sear (fire-control) components, unless, he owns a registered machine gun. The M2 carbine trigger pack is such an example of a "combination of parts" that is a machine gun in and of itself. Most of these have been registered as they were pulled from stores of surplus rifles in the early 1960s. In some special cases, exceptions have been determined to these rules by ATF. A semiautomatic firearm which could have a string or shoelace looped around the cocking handle of and then behind and in front of the trigger in such a way as to allow the firearm to be fired automatically is no longer considered a machine gun unless the string is attached in this manner.

Most current fully automatic trigger groups will not fit their semi-automatic firearm look-alike counterparts—the semi-automatic version is specifically constructed to reject the fully automatic trigger group by adding metal in critical places. This addition is required by ATF to prevent easy conversion of Title I firearms into machine guns.

For the civilian possession, all machine guns must have been manufactured and registered with ATF prior to May 19, 1986, to be transferable between citizens. These machine gun prices have drastically escalated in value, especially items like registered sears and conversion-kits. Only a Class-II manufacturer (a FFL holder licensed to manufacture firearms or Type-07 license that has paid a Special Occupational Tax Stamp or SOT) could manufacture machine guns after that date, and they can only be sold to government, law-enforcement, and military entities. Transfer can only be done to other SOT FFL-holders, and such FFL-holders must have a "demonstration letter" from a respective government agency to receive such machine guns. Falsification and/or misuse of the "demo-letter" process can and has resulted in long jail sentences and felony convictions for violators.

Owning both a short barrel and a legal-length rifle could be construed as intent to build an illegal, unregistered SBR. This possibility was contested and won in the U.S. Supreme Court case of United States v. Thompson-Center Arms Company. ATF lost the case, and was unable to prove that possession of a short barrel for the specific pistol configuration of a Thompson Contender is illegal. ATF later released ruling 2011-4 to clarify the legal status of owning such conversion kits.

Removal of a weapon from classification as an NFA firearm, such as the reclassification of the original Broomhandle Mauser with shoulder stock from "short barrel rifle" (SBR) to a curio or relic handgun, changed its status as a Title II NFA firearm but did not change its status as a Title I Gun Control Act firearm.

Muzzle-loading firearms are exempt from the Act (as they are defined as "antique firearms" and are not considered "firearms" under either the GCA or the NFA). Thus, though common muzzle-loading hunting rifles are available in calibers over 0.50 inch, they are not regulated as destructive devices. Muzzle-loading cannon are similarly exempt since the law makes no distinction about the size of muzzle-loading weapons. Thus it is legal for a civilian to build muzzle-loading rifles, pistols, cannon, and mortars with no paperwork. However, ammunition for these weapons can still be classified as destructive devices themselves, such as explosive shells. While an 'antique firearm' is not considered a 'firearm' under the NFA, some states (such as Oregon) have laws that specifically prohibit anyone that could not otherwise own/obtain an GCA or NFA defined 'firearm' (i.e., felons, recipients of dishonorable discharge from military service, the mentally adjudicated, etc.) from owning/obtaining an 'antique firearm'.

Individuals or companies seeking to market large-bore firearms may apply to ATF for a "sporting clause exception". If granted, ATF acknowledges that the firearm has a legitimate sporting use and is therefore not a destructive device. Certain large safari rifle calibers, such as .585 Nyati and .577 Tyrannosaur, have such exceptions. In addition to the sporting use exception, certain firearms that would otherwise be regulated under the NFA as a destructive device (or SBR/SBS), can be exempt from being an NFA item, if it is listed by the ATF as being an antique, or a collectors item as a curious or relic; for example the .600 Nitro Express is exempt from NFA registration as a destructive device as it is on the ATF's curios and relics list. However, firearms that are ONLY listed as a collectors item under the curios or relic status (like the .600 Nitro) are still regulated as a firearm under Title I of the GCA and require a background check and a Form 4477, or a valid type 03 Collector of Curios and Relics FFL. Items that also classify as an antique are not regulated as firearms under the GCA or NFA, and don't require a background check or an FFL; although machine guns and certain AOWs classified as curios or relics are still regulated under Title I & Title II of the GCA and the NFA.

The phrase "all NFA rules apply" is commonplace. This disclaimer is usually posted in bold print from firearm dealers holding an FFL license.

== Registration, purchases, taxes and transfers ==
It is a common misconception that an individual must have a "Class 3" license in order to own an NFA weapon. A federal firearms license (FFL) is not required to be an individual owner, although it is required as a prerequisite to become a Special Occupation Taxpayer (SOT, see Special Occupational Taxpayers): Class 1 importer, Class 2 manufacturer-dealer or Class 3 dealer in NFA weapons. There are generally three ways to own an NFA weapon: as an individual, through a gun trust, or as a Limited Liability Company (LLC). Legal possession of an NFA firearm by an individual requires transfer of registration within the NFA registry. An individual owner does not need to be an NFA dealer to buy Title II weapons. The sale and purchase of an NFA weapon is, however, taxed and regulated, as follows:

All NFA items must be registered with the Bureau of Alcohol, Tobacco, Firearms and Explosives (ATF). Private owners wishing to purchase an NFA item must obtain approval from the ATF, pass an extensive background check to include submitting a photograph and fingerprints, fully register the firearm, receive ATF written permission before moving the firearm across state lines, and pay a tax. The request to transfer ownership of an NFA item is made on an ATF Form 4. There have been several unfavorable lawsuits where plaintiffs have been denied NFA approval for a transfer. These lawsuits include: Lomont v. O'Neill, Westfall v. Miller, and Steele v. National Branch.

NFA items may also be transferred to corporations (or other legal entities such as a trust). When the paperwork to request transfer of an NFA item is initiated by an officer of a corporation, fingerprint cards and photographs of the official need to be submitted with the transfer request. This method has downsides, since it is the corporation (and not the principal) that owns the firearm. Thus, if the corporation dissolves, it must transfer its NFA weapon to the owners. This event would be considered a new transfer and would be subject to a new transfer tax.

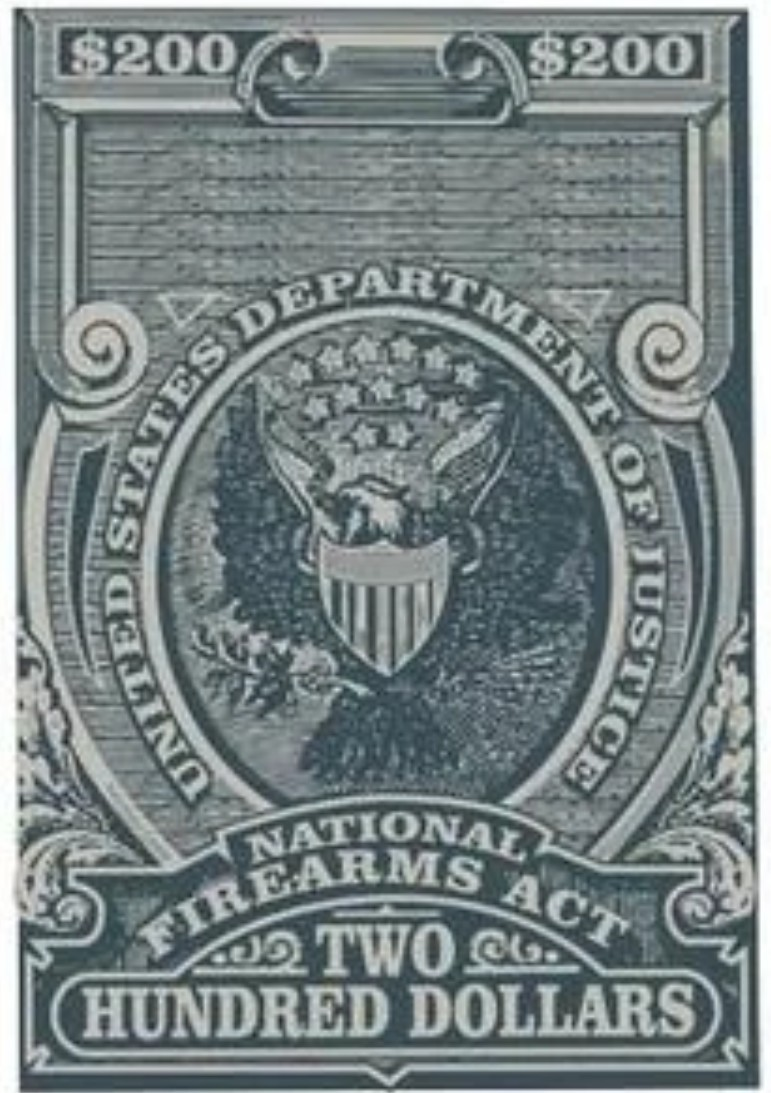
Prior version of the $200 tax stamp for previous approvals of certain NFA regulated items. It is still used for some NFA items not covered by the $0 tax stamp.

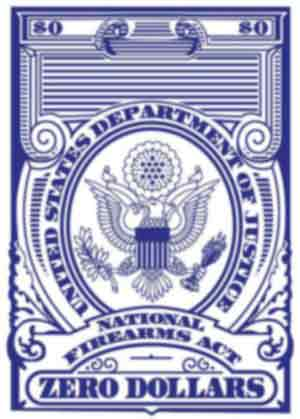
2026 release of the $0 tax stamp for new approvals of certain NFA regulated items.

The tax for privately manufacturing any NFA firearm (other than machine guns, which are illegal for individuals to manufacture) is $200. Before 2026, transferring required a $200 tax for all NFA weapons except AOWs, for which the transfer tax was $5 (although the manufacturing tax remained $200). In 2025, the passage of the One Big Beautiful Bill Act as H.R.1, which was signed into law by President Donald Trump on July 4, 2025, removed the $200 manufacturing and transfer tax for suppressors, short barreled rifles, short barreled shotguns, and AOWs, although the $200 tax remains for machine guns and destructive devices. After the new law went into effect on January 1, 2026, privately manufacturing, purchasing or transferring a suppressor, SBR, SBS, or AOW still requires filing an ATF Form 1 (manufacturing) or Form 4 (transfer) and submitting a photo and copy of fingerprints, but no longer requires the purchase of a tax stamp. In response to the change, applicants filed upwards of 150,000 e-forms for suppressors on January 1, 2026 alone.

All NFA weapons made by individuals must be legal in the State or municipality where the individual lives. The payment of a $200 "making tax" prior to manufacture of the weapon, although a subsequent transfer of AOWs after they are legally "made" is only $5. Only a Class-II manufacturer (a FFL holder licensed as a "Manufacture of Firearms" or Type-07 license that has paid a Special Occupational Tax Stamp or SOT) can manufacture NFA firearms (other than destructive devices) tax free, but they pay a larger annual tax which ranges from $500 to $1000 to cover manufacturing.

A Destructive Device manufacturing license (Type-10 FFL) holder can manufacture destructive devices tax-free. However, a type-07 license costs $150 for three years –– whereas a Type-10 destructive manufacturing license costs $3000 for three years. Both licenses still require the payment of the $500 (reduced-rate) Special Occupational Tax Stamp or SOT, (or the $1000 full tax) per year to conduct manufacturing of NFA weapons that they are respectively qualified to manufacturer. The SOT "reduced rate" applies to a business whose sales are less than $500,000 per year.

Transferable machine guns made or registered before May 19, 1986, are worth far more than their original, pre-1986 value and items like registered "auto-sears", "lightning-links", trigger-packs, trunnions, and other "combination of parts" registered as machine guns before the aforementioned date are often worth nearly as much as a full registered machine gun. For instance, as of September 2008, a transferable M16 costs approximately $11,000 to $18,000, while a transferable "lightning-link" for the AR-15 can sell for $8,000 to $10,000. New manufacture M-16s sell to law enforcement and the military for around $600 to $1000. As of August 2020, registered M60s are selling for $50,000 - $60,000. The increased popularity of online gun selling on websites like Gunbroker, combined with the hugely decreased processing time for NFA applications from the ATF switching to online filing in 2023, has served to drive the prices of transferable machine guns up even further since 2008. As of September 2025, transferable AR-15 full-auto conversions have gone from costing around $12,000 in 2003 to $30,000, with transferrable M16s ranging from $20,000 - $60,000. A Colt M16A1 sold for around $15,000 in 2003 and averages around $42,000 in 2025, with M16A2s costing over $60,000. In 2003, an RDIAS (Registered Drop-in Auto Sear) AR-15 conversion kit averaged about $12,000, by the end of 2024 they were averaging $50,000, prior to the ATF's rule change requiring auto-sears to be registered as machine guns in 1981, new ones were sold for only $29.95 (equal to $107.02 in 2025).

Upon the request of any ATF agent or investigator, or the Attorney General, the registered owner must provide proof of registration of the firearm.

In a number of situations, an NFA item may be transferred without a transfer tax. These include sales to government agencies, temporary transfers of an NFA firearm to a gunsmith for repairs, and transfer of an NFA firearm to a lawful heir after the death of its owner. A permanent transfer, even if tax-free, must be approved by ATF. The proper form should be submitted to ATF before the transfer occurs. For example, lawful heirs must submit a Form 5 and wait for approval before taking possession of any NFA item willed to them. Temporary transfers, such as those to a gunsmith or to the original manufacturer for repair, are not subject to ATF approval since they are not legally considered transfers. ATF does, however, recommend filing tax-free transfer paperwork on all such temporary transfers, to confer an extra layer of legal protection on both the owner and the gunsmith.

== Criminal conduct ==
The Act makes certain conduct a criminal offense, in relation to engaging in business as a manufacturer, importer, or dealer with respect to (NFA) firearms without having registered or paid a Special Occupational Tax (SOT); receiving or possessing a firearm transferred to oneself in violation of the NFA; receiving or possessing a firearm made in violation of the NFA; receiving or possessing a firearm not registered to oneself in the National Firearms Registration and Transfer Record; transferring or making a firearm in violation of the NFA; or obliterating, removing, changing, or altering the serial number of the firearm.

== Criminal penalties ==
Violations of the Act are punishable by up to 10 years in federal prison and forfeiture of all devices or firearms in violation, and the individual's right to own or possess firearms in the future. The Act provides for a penalty of $10,000 for certain violations. A willful attempt to evade or defeat a tax imposed by the Act is a felony punishable by up to five years in prison and a $100,000 fine ($500,000 in the case of a corporation or trust), under the general tax evasion statute. For an individual, the felony fine of $100,000 for tax evasion could be increased to $250,000.

== Exceptions ==
The United States Supreme Court has ruled in Haynes v. United States that the Fifth Amendment to the United States Constitution exempts felons—and, by extrapolation, all other prohibited possessors—from the registration requirements of the Act. The prohibited person who violates the possession prohibition can, however, be convicted under the Gun Control Act of 1968 for being a prohibited person in possession of a (any) firearm.

The Atomic Energy Act of 1954 was amended in 2005 and includes a provision (42 U.S.C. § 2201a) to allow Nuclear Regulatory Commission (NRC) licensees and authorized contractors to possess machine guns for the purpose of providing security.

== The market for NFA items ==
Importation of NFA firearms was banned by the 1968 Gun Control Act which implemented a "sporting" clause. Only firearms judged by ATF to have feasible sporting applications can be imported for civilian use. Licensed manufacturers of NFA firearms may still, with the proper paperwork, import foreign NFA firearms for research and development purposes, or for government use.

The domestic manufacture of new machine guns that civilians could purchase was effectively banned by language in the Firearm Owners Protection Act of 1986 (also known as "McClure-Volkmer"). The language was added in an amendment from William J. Hughes and referred to as the Hughes Amendment. Machine guns legally registered prior to the date of enactment (i.e. May 1986) are still legal for possession by and transfer among civilians where permitted by state law. The static and relatively small number of transferable machine guns has caused their price to rise, often over $10,000, although transferable MAC-10 and MAC-11 submachine guns can still be purchased for around $8,000. Machine guns manufactured after the FOPA's enactment can be sold only to law enforcement and government agencies, exported, or held as inventory or "dealer samples" by licensed manufacturers and dealers. Machine guns made after 1986 for law enforcement but not transferable to civilian registration are usually priced only a few hundred dollars more than their semi-automatic counterparts, whereas a pre-Hughes Amendment registered machine gun that can be legally transferred commands a huge premium.

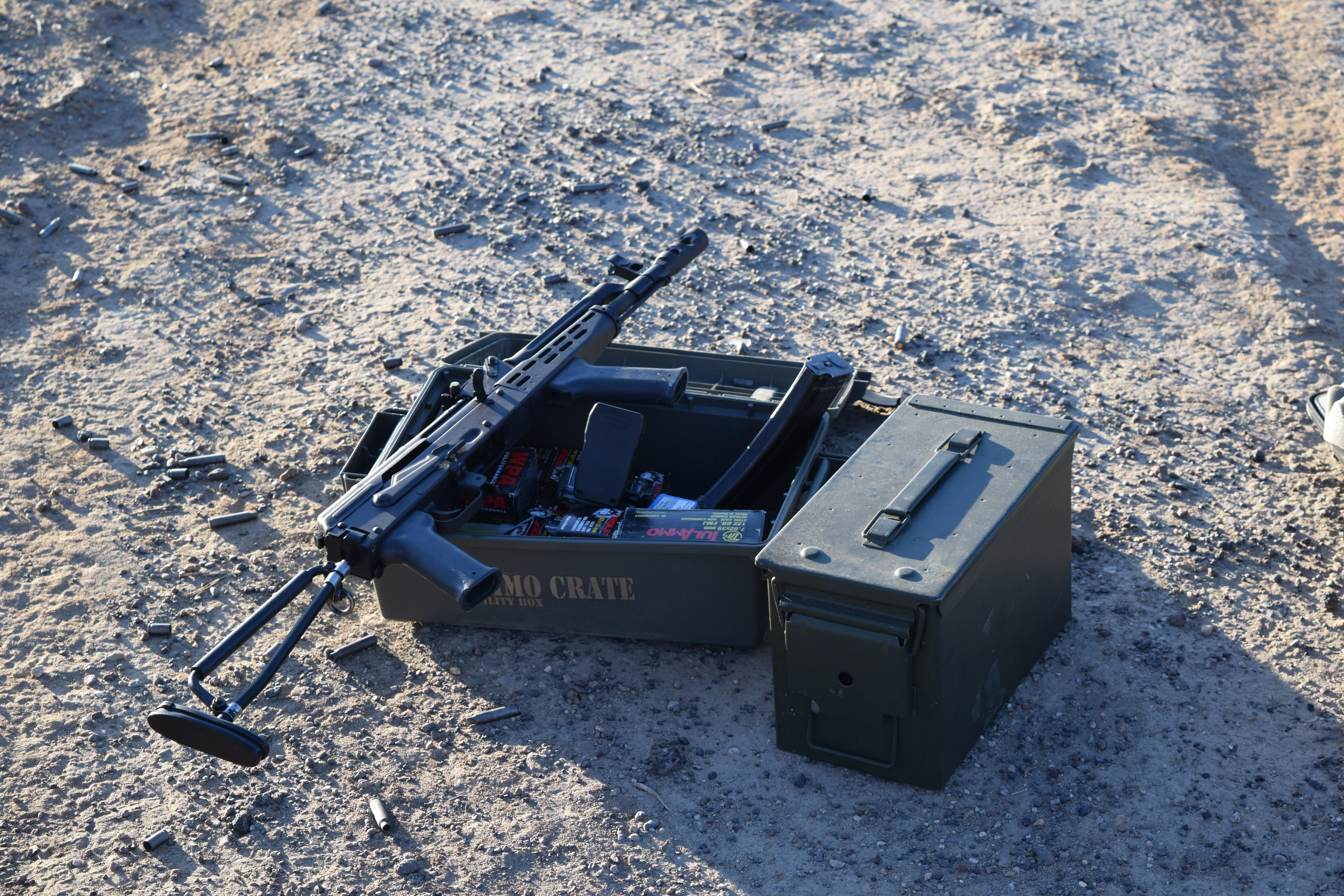
A select fire AMD-65, an example of a dealer sample

The Hughes Amendment affected only machine guns. All other NFA firearms are still legal for manufacture and registration by civilians under Form 1, and transfer of registration to civilians via Form 4 (though some states have their own laws governing which NFA firearms are legal to own there). Silencers and Short-Barreled Rifles are generally the most popular NFA firearms among civilians, followed by Short-Barreled Shotguns, Destructive Devices, and "Any Other Weapons". While most NFA firearms are bought from manufacturers and transferred to civilians through a dealer, many are made by civilians themselves after they file a Form 1 and pay the $200 tax. Some types of NFA firearms can be relatively simple to make: a Short-Barreled Rifle can be made by swapping out the upper receiver for one containing a short barrel, and a Short-Barreled Shotgun can be created by using a pipe cutter to shorten the barrel length. Other NFA firearms, such as suppressors, require more technical skill.

== NFA trust ==
An NFA trust (also known as a gun trust, Title II trust, ATF trust, or Class 3 trust) is a legal trust that is used in the United States to register and own NFA firearms. Under regulations, use of a trust allows prospective purchasers of NFA items to avoid some of the federal transfer requirements that would otherwise be imposed on an individual. Like other trusts, it allows for estate planning in inheriting firearms. In 2013, ATF proposed new rules, often referred to as ATF Proposed Rule 41p, which, if adopted, would require all "responsible persons" of an entity being used to purchase NFA items to comply with the same procedures as individuals in obtaining NFA items. In an NFA trust, a responsible person is defined as "any grantor, trustee, beneficiary, ... who possesses, directly or indirectly, the power or authority under any trust instrument, ... to receive, possess, ship, transport, deliver, transfer, or otherwise dispose of a firearm for, or on behalf of, the entity." ATF finalized the rule on January 15, 2016, to become effective 180 days later. The previous requirement for "chief law enforcement officer" approval was eliminated, while all responsible people for a trust must now comply with the same restrictions as individual owners.

== Miller case ==
In 1938, the United States District Court for the Western District of Arkansas ruled the statute unconstitutional in United States v. Miller. The defendant Miller had been arrested for possession of an unregistered short double-barreled shotgun, and for "unlawfully ... transporting [it] in interstate commerce from Claremore, Oklahoma to Siloam Springs, Arkansas" which perfected the crime. The government's argument was that the short barreled shotgun was not a military-type weapon and thus not a "militia" weapon protected by the Second Amendment, from federal infringement. The District Court agreed with Miller's argument that the shotgun was legal under the Second Amendment.

The District Court ruling was overturned on a direct appeal to the United States Supreme Court (see United States v. Miller). No brief was filed on behalf of the defendants, and the defendants themselves did not appear before the Supreme Court. Miller himself had been murdered one month prior to the Supreme Court's decision. No evidence that such a firearm was "ordinary military equipment" had been presented at the trial court (apparently because the case had been thrown out—at the defendants' request—before evidence could be presented), although two Supreme Court justices at the time had been United States Army officers during World War I and may have had personal knowledge of the use of such weapons in combat. The Supreme Court indicated it could not take judicial notice of such a contention.

The Supreme Court reversed the District Court and held that the NFA provision (criminalizing possession of certain firearms) was not in violation of the Second Amendment's restriction and therefore was constitutional.

Subsequent rulings have been allowed to stand, indicating that short-barreled shotguns are generally recognized as ordinary military equipment if briefs are filed (e.g., see: Cases v. United States), describing use of short-barreled shotguns in specialized military units.

== Silencer Shop Case ==
On August 5, 2026, in the case of Silencer Shop Foundation v. ATF (2026), the United States District Court for the Northern District of Texas held that the National Firearm Act's registration requirements are unconstitutional as applied to $0 tax items (SBRs, SBSs, AOWs, & Suppressors). Specifically, the court found that requiring the registration of untaxed items violated Article I, § 8, Clause 1 of the Constitution, which is known as the Taxing and Spending Clause. Prior challenges to the NFA's registration requirements failed because courts — including the Supreme Court in Sonzinsky v. United States (1937) — upheld the registration requirement as falling within Congress' authority under the Taxing and Spending Clause to keep track of taxes and revenue. In this case, the court ruled that since the registration requirements for NFA items was solely for the purpose of the collection and enforcement of the taxes paid on NFA items, once Congress eliminated the making and transfer tax on these items, they were no longer producing revenue for the government and therefore the registration provisions can no longer be upheld under Congress' taxing power.

The court issued a permanent injunction against the Department of Justice and the ATF that went into effect on August 13, 2026, prohibiting them from enforcing NFA registration requirements against $0 tax items. However, the injunction only applies to the plaintiffs of the case and their customers and members, both current and future. The plaintiffs are: Silencer Shop Foundation, B&T USA, Palmetto State Armory (PSA), SilencerCo, Gun Owners of America (GOA), Firearms Regulatory Accountability Coalition (FRAC), and Gun Owners Foundation (GOF). Fifteen states were also plaintiffs in the case: Alaska, Georgia, Idaho, Indiana, Kansas, Louisiana, Montana, North Dakota, Oklahoma, South Carolina, South Dakota, Texas, Utah, West Virginia, and Wyoming; the injunction also applies to these "states, their agencies, and their political subdivisions." With respect to the plaintiff states, before there was clarification from the ATF, the court’s injunction only extended to their agencies and political subdivisions. It did not initially cover the citizens of those states at large. The plaintiffs authored a letter to both the Department of Justice and the ATF, requesting guidance in writing from the ATF on what steps it will take to cease enforcement of the challenged NFA provisions against the named plaintiffs, and whether or not the citizens of these states will be covered by the injunction if the Department of Justice decides not to appeal the ruling to the United States Court of Appeals for the Fifth Circuit. On September 24, 2026, the Solicitor General told Congress in a letter that the Department had determined not to file an appeal.

Under the terms of the injunction, members of GOA, FRAC, and GOF (who are not prohibited by state and local law) are able to purchase a suppressor from one of the aforementioned companies, i.e. PSA, SilencerCo, and Silencer Shop, without having to go through the NFA process, such as filing an ATF Form 4, submitting a photo and fingerprints, and waiting for ATF approval. Instead, for those covered by the injunction, purchasing a suppressor is the same as any Title I firearm: completing a Form 4473 and passing a NICS background check.

How the injunction applied to AOWs, SBRs, and SBS's was more complex. Under the terms of the injunction, all plaintiffs in the case who purchased a standard Title I rifle, pistol, or shotgun from a plaintiff company — B&T, PSA, SilencerCo, Silencer Shop — are entitled to reconfigure it into an SBR or SBS without going through the NFA process and filing a Form 1 and waiting for ATF approval (assuming it is not prohibited by state or local law). But ONLY if ALL components, i.e. receiver, barrel, stock etc., were purchased from a plaintiff company. The injunction also extended to the NFA’s regulation of AOWs, but ONLY for the Silencer Shop plaintiffs, which are GOA, FRAC, & GOF (it does not cover AOWs from B&T and PSA). However, since this injunction did not apply to the Gun Control Act of 1968 (GCA), anyone buying a premanufactured SBR or SBS from a plaintiff company still had to file a Form 4 and wait for ATF approval. This was because of a provision in the GCA, enacted at 18 U.S.C. § 922(b)(4), which states that a federal licensee may not sell or deliver a short-barreled rifle, short-barreled shotgun, machine gun, or destructive device to any person "except as specifically authorized by the Attorney General consistent with public safety and necessity", with the approval of a Form 4 serving as the Attorney General's authorization. The injunction also did not enjoin 26 U.S.C. § 5861(j), (k), which makes it unlawful “to transport, deliver, or receive any firearm in interstate commerce which has not been registered as required by the NFA”.

The injunction also does not enjoin the maker identification requirements at 26 U.S.C. § 5842(a) and 27 C.F.R. § 479.102, which require someone manufacturing an NFA item to engrave it with their unique marking and a serial number (if it doesn't already have a serial number), whether or not a plaintiff manufacturing one of these items would be required to engrave it is also uncertain at this time. Although in May, 2026, the ATF proposed a new rule which would eliminate the requirement for individuals to add custom "maker's marks" or re-engrave a serial number when converting an existing factory-marked firearm into an SBR, or SBS, but it hasn't been officially adopted yet.

This injunction does not affect state or local laws that pertain to NFA items. Even if someone is a plaintiff in the case, the injunction does not apply to them if they live in one of 23 states that either have laws banning affected NFA items, or requiring them to be federally registered. As of August, 2026 there are nine states where the possession of either some, or all, of the items covered by the injunction is prohibited by law: California, Delaware, Hawaii, Illinois, Massachusetts, New Jersey, New York, Rhode Island, and Washington D.C. There are 15 states with laws that require some form of approval and/or registration from the Federal government under the National Firearms Act to legally possess NFA items, which potentially prevents the injunction from applying to plaintiffs in the following states: Alaska, Colorado, Connecticut, Georgia, Michigan, Mississippi, Montana, Nevada, North Carolina, North Dakota, Ohio, Oregon, Pennsylvania, Washington, and Wisconsin.

=== ATF Guidance ===
In an open letter dated October 9, 2026, ATF Director Robert Cekada announced that as a matter of their discretion, the ATF and the Attorney General "will no longer require individuals to seek ATF approval under the NFA before making or transferring short-barreled rifles, short-barreled shotguns, silencers, and “any other weapon[s]” as defined in 26 U.S.C. § 5845(e). ATF will also no longer require such items to be registered in the National Firearms Registration and Transfer Record. These policies apply uniformly to anyone otherwise subject to these requirements, not just to the plaintiffs in the litigation". Under this guidance, the ATF will no longer be enforcing the requirement for individuals to obtain prior approval before manufacturing or transferring $0 NFA items (SBRs, SBSs, AOWs, & suppressors), and they are no longer enforcing the requirement for them to be registered in the National Firearms Registration and Transfer Record (NFRTR). The ATF is also no longer enforcing the requirement for SOT FFLs to submit a Form 2 when manufacturing or importing a $0 NFA item, nor are SOT FFLs required to submit a Form 3 when transferring applicable NFA items between SOT dealers. This applies to all individuals, corporations, and FFLs nationwide, not just the plaintiffs of the Silencer Shop case. As with the Court's injunction, this guidance does not apply to machine guns or destructive devices, nor does it supersede state and local laws that restrict NFA firearms. Under this guidance, FFLs may transfer the aforementioned NFA items using a standard Form 4473 and a NICS background check, unless prohibited from doing so by state or local law.

For those living in states with laws requiring NFA registration, or for those who otherwise wish to do so, the ATF will continue to administer the NFA on a voluntary basis. Individuals manufacturing $0 NFA items can voluntarily register them using a Form 1 application, and many FFL's are offering individuals the choice to transfer affected NFA items using a Form 4 or Form 5 if they so chose. SOT FFLs may also continue to voluntarily submit Form 2 and Form 3 notifications. Individuals who have NFA items subject to the injunction that are currently registered in the NFRTR (including NFA items registered prior to the removal of the tax) can have these items unregistered by writing or emailing the NFA Division to request their removal from the registry; although once these items are removed from the registry, they cannot be re-registered unless the Attorney General declares an amnesty.

Since the Court's injunction did not affect the GCA's provisions regarding the transport of short-barreled rifles and short-barreled shotguns in interstate commerce (18 U.S.C. § 922(a)(4)), anyone transporting a SBR or SBS across state lines is still required to file a Form 20 prior to doing so, even if the firearm is unregistered. Even with the filing of a Form 20, individuals with unregistered NFA items should exercise caution when traveling through states that require NFA items to be registered, as it is currently unclear whether state courts will honor the safe passage provisions of the Firearm Owners Protection Act (FOPA) regarding the interstate transport of unregistered NFA firearms.

As the Court's injunction did not apply to Special Occupational Taxes (SOT), Federal Firearms License (FFL) holders are still required to pay the applicable taxes in order to be engaged in the businesses of dealing (class 3 SOT), manufacturing (class 2 SOT), or importing (class 1 SOT) short-barreled rifles, short-barreled shotguns, any other weapons, or silencers.

The ATF and legal experts have both pointed out that individuals choosing to manufacture or transfer unregistered NFA items, or choosing to un-register prior NFA items, should keep in mind that there are potential future legal risks in doing so. This is simply an enforcement policy change due to an injunction, the NFA has not been repealed and material changes in legal or factual circumstances could cause NFA enforcement to resume. For example, a future decision by the United States Court of Appeals for the Fifth Circuit or the Supreme Court of the United States could vacate the injunction or overturn the District Court's ruling in this case. An administration change could result in a new ATF Director and/or a new Attorney General deciding to rescind the enforcement guidelines. Congress could impose a new tax on NFA items, rendering the injunction moot since it rests squarely on the fact that these items are no longer generating revenue for the government. The tax on these NFA items was removed through a budget reconciliation and the tax can easily be restored through another budget reconciliation, which is very likely to happen after the changes in the makeup of the House and Senate following the 2026 midterm elections. If the NFA tax is restored and enforcement of the NFA resumes, any unregistered NFA items would immediately be considered contraband and individuals who make, possess, transfer, or receive unregistered NFA firearms are subject to felony penalties and forfeitures. Federal law does not usually allow subsequent registration of unregistered NFA items that have already been manufactured and/or transferred, and there are no guaranteed provisions that would automatically grandfather unregistered NFA firearms should enforcement resume. There is only one exception to this, but it exists solely at the discretion of the Attorney General. The NFA (at 27 CFR § 479.101) permits the Attorney General to create an amnesty period for up to 90 days to facilitate registration of unregistered items, and allows the making and transfer tax to be waived during the amnesty period (such as the amnesty period following Final Rule 2021R-08F in 2023 requiring braced AR pistols to be registered as SBRs). However, the Attorney General is not required to hold an amnesty period or waive the tax.

== See also ==
- Firearm case law in the United States
- Gun Control Act of 1968
- Gun law in the United States
- Gun politics in the United States
- Uniform Firearms Act
