= In re Stolar =

- Supreme Court of the United States

Argued December 9, 1969 Reargued October 14–15, 1970 Decided February 23, 1971
- Full case name: Application of Martin Robert Stolar
- Citations: 401 U.S. 23 (more) 91 S. Ct. 713; 27 L. Ed. 2d 657; 1971 U.S. LEXIS 82; 57 Ohio Op. 2d 26

Case history
- Prior: Cert. to the Supreme Court of Ohio

Holding
- The First Amendment prohibits Ohio from requiring bar applicants to list every organization they belonged to since age 17.

Court membership
- Chief Justice Warren E. Burger Associate Justices Hugo Black · William O. Douglas; John M. Harlan II · William J. Brennan Jr. Potter Stewart · Byron White; Thurgood Marshall · Harry Blackmun

Case opinions
- Plurality: Black, joined by Douglas, Brennan, Marshall
- Concurrence: Stewart
- Dissent: Harlan
- Dissent: White
- Dissent: Blackmun, joined by Burger, Harlan, White

In re Stolar, 401 U.S. 23 (1971), was a case in which the Supreme Court of the United States held that requiring bar applicants, like Martin Stolar, to list every organization that they belonged to since age 17 is a violation of the First Amendment.

== See also ==
- List of United States Supreme Court cases, volume 401
- In re Anastaplo
