= Handgun hunting =

Hunting animals using specialized handguns

Handgun hunting is a form of hunting primarily done with specialized handguns that have long barrels and mounted scopes (optical aiming devices).

Even the largest animals, such as elephants, can be killed with modern hunting handguns, although most handgun hunters only use handguns when hunting medium-sized game like deer and wild hogs.

The .44 Magnum, developed in 1955, was the beginning of handgun hunting for mainstream hunters. Handgun hunters consider their activity more 'sporting' than using rifles. The comparatively short sight radius of a handgun and typically less powerful ammunition than used with rifles, means that any handgun hunter must stalk closer to the prey in order to kill the animal humanely, giving said animal more chance of detecting and avoiding the hunter.

Most hunting handguns are either single-shot pistols, single-action revolvers, or double-action revolvers.

Handgun hunting differs from rifle or shotgun hunting because a significant amount of shooting practice must be undertaken in order to become and remain proficient. It is not uncommon for a skilled handgun hunter to be able to cleanly take game at ranges exceeding 100 yards, even 200 yards or more is possible with a single-shot, scoped hunting pistol.

With the exception of small-game hunting using rimfire cartridges, very few semi-automatic handguns are well suited for hunting, typically lacking both the power necessary and proper sights. Nonetheless, some of the more powerful semi-automatic pistols are sometimes used for hunting medium and large game, particularly those chambered for 10mm Auto, .45 Super, .460 Rowland, .41 Magnum, .44 Magnum, and .50 AE. Double-action revolvers can be cocked using the hammer spur to allow for a shorter and lighter trigger which can result in fewer disturbances of the sight alignment during the trigger pull, thus aiding a hunter's accuracy. Single-action revolvers that require cocking the hammer with the spur also benefit from the short, light trigger but often have longer lock times. The design of the single-action revolver typically secures the cylinder more positively because the cylinder does not swing out as it does on most double-action revolvers. This design strength and the simplicity of the single-action make them popular for big-bore hunting revolvers, but the strength of a revolver comes mostly from the integrity of the cylinder which holds the combustion pressure within the metallic cartridge. The amount and type of material surrounding a chamber give it strength. Larger bore diameters and a greater number of chambers will increase the diameter of the cylinder and the height of the frame and the overall size of the revolver.

== See also ==
- Howdah pistol large calibre backup pistols carried by British hunters hunting dangerous game
- Remington XP-100
- Thompson Center Arms
- Performance Center by Smith and Wesson
