= H&R Handy-Gun =

Single-shot, breech-loading handgun

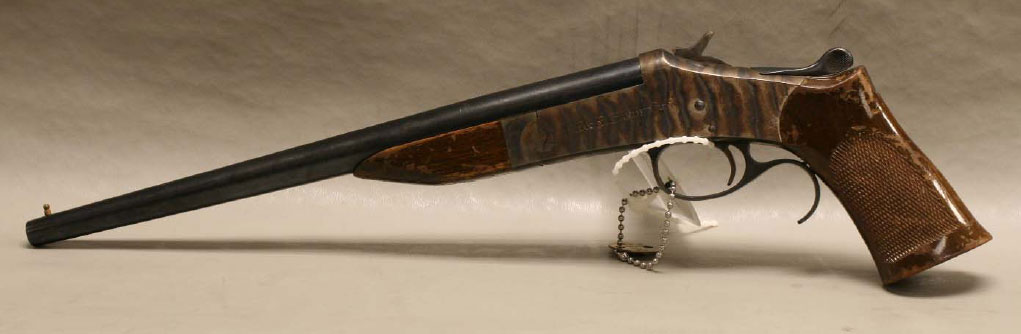
An H&R Handy-Gun.

The H&R Handy-Gun is a single-shot, breech-loading handgun produced from 1921 to 1934 by Harrington & Richardson. Two principal variants were produced: one with a rifled barrel and one smooth-bore.

The rifled-barrel variant was produced from 1930 to 1934 and it featured a 12 1/4" barrel. It was available in .22 WRF, .32-20, and possibly other centerfire cartridges. Some guns were originally factory-fitted with a wire stock. Production was halted with the passage of the National Firearms Act of 1934 (NFA34). Rifled versions with a detachable wire stock are a short-barreled rifle under federal law and require registration. Pistols without the stock are exempt.

The smooth-bore version was produced from 1921 to 1934 and sports an 8" or 12 1/4" barrel. The gun was available in .410-bore (most 2½") and 28-gauge. After the passage of NFA34, the smooth-bore Handy-Gun was classed as an "any other weapon". Production halted after the passage of the act, after approximately 54,000 Handy-Guns had been produced.

== See also ==
- Garden gun
- Marble Game Getter
- Title II weapons
