= Hill v. California =

- Supreme Court of the United States

Argued January 19 and October 21, 1970 Decided April 5, 1971
- Full case name: Archie William Hill, Jr. v. State of California
- Citations: 401 U.S. 797 (more)

Case history
- Prior: Certiorari to the Supreme Court of California

Holding
- Although the search incident to arrest was based on mistaken identity, the officers acted in good-faith based on probable cause. Chimel not applied retroactively.

Court membership
- Chief Justice Warren E. Burger Associate Justices Hugo Black · William O. Douglas; John M. Harlan II · William J. Brennan Jr. Potter Stewart · Byron White; Thurgood Marshall · Harry Blackmun

Case opinions
- Majority: White, joined by Burger, Brennan, Stewart, Blackmun
- Concurrence: Black
- Concur/dissent: Harlan, joined by Marshall
- Douglas took no part in the consideration or decision of the case.

Laws applied
- Chimel v. California

Hill v. California, 401 U.S. 797 (1971) was a U.S. Supreme Court decision that ruled against the retroactive application of Chimel v. California. The Court also ruled that evidence from mistaken identity arrests can be admissible as long as other factors support probable cause.

== Background ==
A day after four armed men robbed a Studio City residence, Los Angeles Police arrested Alfred Baum and Richard Bader for narcotics possession during a June 5, 1966 traffic stop. The stopped car was registered to Archie William Hill Jr. Both Bader and Baum confessed to taking part in the Studio City robbery after items from the crime were found in the car; they further implicated Hill. Bader told the police that he shared a Sepulveda Boulevard apartment with Hill. Bader also stated that firearms used in the robbery and other stolen property were hidden in Hill's apartment. On June 6, Baum and Bader again implicated Hill as one of the robbers.

After Hill's association with Bader was verified, and his description was connected with statements from the Studio City victims, four officers knocked on the door of Hill's apartment; the officers possessed no search or arrest warrants. (Note: The counsel for California claimed that it was impossible to obtain warrants as the search was conducted in the evening.) Miller, a man who matched Hill's description, opened the door; the LAPD officers arrested him in the living room under the assumption that he was allegedly involved in the robbery. (Note: Miller was only 10 pounds heavier and 2 inches taller than Hill.) While he confirmed that the apartment was Hill's and that he was waiting for him, Miller emphasized that there was a case of mistaken identity, and denied knowledge of any guns or stolen property.

The police testified that a semi-automatic pistol and an ammunition-feeding device were lying on a coffee table in plain view. (Note: Court records mention that there was an "automatic pistol and a clip" in plain view, but the specific model of handgun was not mentioned. It is therefore currently unknown whether the justices were referring to an external magazine.) Officers then searched the apartment despite Miller producing identification. Two switchblades, a starter pistol, two improvised masks, rent receipts, property from the robbery, and two pages of Hill's diary containing a confession to the robbery were seized from the bedroom. A .22 caliber revolver was seized from under the living room sofa as well.

Hill pled innocence, and filed motions to suppress the evidence found during the search. The trial court denied the motion on the basis that the officers acted in good faith. Although the prosecution's eyewitnesses were unable to identify him as one of the robbers, Hill was convicted on October 20, 1966. The California Court of Appeals reversed his conviction by arguing that the apartment search was unreasonable. However, the California Supreme Court reversed the decision.

== Opinion of the Court ==
In a 6-2 decision delivered by Justice Byron White, the Supreme Court declined to apply Chimel retroactively. Additionally, the Court upheld the conviction due to factors supporting probable cause for Miller's initial arrest and the subsequent search. Even though the officers made a mistake, their actions were conducted in good faith based on a combination of reasonable inferences and objective observations.

Miller attempted to challenge the diary evidence as a 5th Amendment violation under Boyd v. United States, but the Court rejected this objection as the issue was not brought up during the initial state proceedings.

=== Harlan's Concurrence-Dissent ===
While Justice John M. Harlan II agreed that there was probable cause behind the mistaken arrest of Miller and the search of the living room, he vehemently disagreed with the decision not to apply Chimel retroactively. He opined that the officers should have obtained a search warrant before searching the bedroom on the basis of Baum and Bauder revealing Hill's role a day before the search happened.

== Impact ==
Although modern police officers have to navigate within the confines of Chimel, the decision allows officers to search a person and the immediate area on the basis of probable cause even if the arrest originated from a mistaken identity.
