= United States v. White =

- Supreme Court of the United States

Argued November 10, 1969 Reargued October 20, 1970 Decided April 5, 1971
- Full case name: United States v. White
- Citations: 401 U.S. 745 (more) 91 S. Ct. 1122; 28 L. Ed. 2d 453; 1971 U.S. LEXIS 132

Case history
- Prior: 405 F.2d 838 (7th Cir. 1969); cert. granted, 394 U.S. 957 (1969).
- Subsequent: Rehearing denied, 402 U.S. 990 (1971); on remand, 454 F.2d 435 (7th Cir. 1971); cert. denied, 406 U.S. 962 (1972); conviction and sentencing affirmed, 470 F.2d 170 (7th Cir. 1972).

Holding
- Conversations recorded and monitored at various locations, including defendant's home, by use of a concealed radio transmitter worn by an informant did not violate the Fourth Amendment protection against unreasonable searches and seizures.

Court membership
- Chief Justice Warren E. Burger Associate Justices Hugo Black · William O. Douglas; John M. Harlan II · William J. Brennan Jr. Potter Stewart · Byron White; Thurgood Marshall · Harry Blackmun

Case opinions
- Plurality: White, joined by Burger, Stewart, Blackmun
- Concurrence: Black
- Concurrence: Brennan
- Dissent: Douglas
- Dissent: Harlan
- Dissent: Marshall

Laws applied
- U.S. Const. amend. IV

United States v. White, 401 U.S. 745 (1971), was a United States Supreme Court decision which held that recording conversations using concealed radio transmitters worn by informants does not violate the Fourth Amendment protection against unreasonable searches and seizures, and thus does not require a warrant.

== Facts and procedural history ==
Criminal defendant White was convicted of narcotics charges in the United States District Court for the Northern District of Illinois, Eastern Division. The conviction was based on evidence obtained from recorded conversations in 1965 and 1966 between the defendant White and a government informant wearing a concealed radio transmitter. White appealed the conviction, claiming the conversations were recorded without his permission, that he had a reasonable expectation of privacy (see Katz), and the conversations were recorded without a warrant, violating his Fourth Amendment protection against unreasonable searches and seizures. Thus, White argued that the recorded conversations should not have been admitted as evidence. The United States Court of Appeals for the Seventh Circuit, 405 F.2d 838, reversed the district court and remanded, and certiorari was granted.

== Decision and rationale ==
The Supreme Court reversed the decision of the Seventh Circuit Court of Appeals with a four-vote plurality, arguing that the use of government agents to reveal conversations does not violate the Fourth Amendment. The court stated that a defendant's expectation that his colleague will not reveal incriminating information to the police is not protected under the Constitution. Furthermore, since a police informant may write down records of conversations with a defendant and admit them into evidence without a warrant, electronically recorded conversations should not be treated any differently under the constitution. So long as the police informant's actions are considered to be reasonable investigative efforts, the officer's records are lawful and admissible evidence, despite a lack of a warrant.

The plurality opinion also found that it was an error for the Court of Appeals to apply the reasoning of Katz v. United States, which held that wiretapping a public phone booth required a search warrant, since the Katz decision from 1967 did not retroactively apply to conversations recorded between 1965 and 1966.

== Dissenting opinion ==
Justice Douglas dissented, stating: "Electronic Surveillance is the greatest leveler of human privacy ever known. The concepts of privacy which the Founders enshrined in the Fourth Amendment vanish completely when we slavishly allow an all powerful government, proclaiming law and order, efficiency, and other benign purposes, to penetrate all the walls and doors which men need to shield them from the pressures of a turbulent life around them and give them the health and strength to carry on. Today no one perhaps notices because only a small obscure criminal is the victim. But every person is the victim, for the technology we exalt today is everyone's master." He goes on to warn: "I would stand by Katz and reaffirm the need for judicial supervision under the Fourth Amendment of the use of electronic surveillance which, uncontrolled, promises to lead us into a police state."

Justice Harlan dissented separately, noting that "the uncontrolled consensual surveillance in an electronic age is a tolerable technique of law enforcement given the values and goals of our political system." However, he added that this tolerance should be balanced against the utility as a technique of law enforcement "to the extent of its likely impact on individual’s sense of security." Alluding to "the Orwellian Big Brother," he wrote that warrantless "electronic monitoring, subject only to the self-restraint of law enforcement officials, has no place in our society," and dissented on the grounds that the risks of the electronic listener or observer should not be imposed on citizens "without at least the protection of a warrant requirement."

Justice Marshall also dissented separately, arguing that the Court's plurality opinion takes a giant step backward in that it precludes lower courts from resolving wholly disparate controversies, in the light of constitutional principles, in ways best suited to their individual jurisdictions, even going so far as to remind the majority that the Supreme Court is not the only tribunal in the entire federal system:

Apparently Desist is now to be understood as holding that all lower federal courts are disabled from adjudicating on their merits all allegations of Fourth Amendment error not squarely supported by a prior decision of this Court. If so, one wonders what purpose is served by providing intermediate appellate review of constitutional issues in the federal criminal process. We must not forget that this Court is not the only tribunal in the entire federal system charged with a responsibility for the nurture and development of the Fourth Amendment. It is one thing to disable all federal courts, including this Court, from applying the settled law of the land to cases and controversies before them -- as Desist does with Katz -- and at least another giant step backward to preclude lower courts from resolving wholly disparate controversies in the light of constitutional principles. Can it be seriously contended, as the plurality opinion necessarily implies, that the Court of Appeals should not be reversed today on these alternative grounds had it simply omitted to discuss Katz. To force lower federal courts to adjudicate controversies either mechanistically or disingenuously is, for me, indefensible. Yet this is precisely what the plurality opinion does with its assertion that it is error for lower courts to "dispose" of a case based on their "understanding of the principles announced" in Katz for the next year or so.

== See also ==
- List of United States Supreme Court cases, volume 401
- Katz v. United States, 389 U.S. 347 (1967)
