= In re Anastaplo =

- Supreme Court of the United States

Decided April 24, 1961
- Full case name: In re Anastaplo
- Citations: 366 U.S. 82 (more)

Holding
- Denying a bar applicant's character and fitness because they would not answer questions about membership in the Communist Party did not violate the applicant's rights.

Court membership
- Chief Justice Earl Warren Associate Justices Hugo Black · Felix Frankfurter; William O. Douglas · Tom C. Clark; John M. Harlan II · William J. Brennan Jr. Charles E. Whittaker · Potter Stewart

Case opinions
- Majority: Harlan
- Dissent: Black, joined by Warren, Douglas, Brennan

In re Anastaplo, 366 U.S. 82 (1961), was a United States Supreme Court case in which the Court held that denying a bar applicant's character and fitness because they would not answer questions about membership in the Communist Party did not violate the applicant's rights.

== Background ==
During a hearing with the Committee on Character and Fitness required for George Anastaplo to join the Illinois bar and become a lawyer, the committee asked Anastaplo whether he was a member of the Communist Party. Anastaplo refused to answer because he felt the question violated his freedom of speech and association, and his application was denied for interference with the committee's questioning. Anastaplo appealed and a court ruled that the question was proper, so Anastaplo received a second hearing in which the Committee asked him again. Anastaplo refused to answer a second time for the same reason.

== Supreme Court ==
When the case made it to the Supreme Court, the Court upheld the decision to deny him membership in the Bar because refusing to answer a "material" question from the Committee on Character and Fitness was a reason to deny someone membership to the Bar on its own. For that matter, when Anastaplo asserted that the question was arbitrary and discriminatory, the Court replied that the application of the rule regarding refusals to answer specific questions was neither arbitrary nor discriminatory.

There was never any evidence that Anastaplo was a member of the Communist Party, but this was immaterial to the Court. The Court described the question as one posed in good faith to determine if Anastaplo had the moral character appropriate of a lawyer, so it was fine whether the Committee knew him to be a member or came up with the question arbitrarily.

== See also ==
- In re Stolar
