= George Anastaplo =

American law professor (1925–2014)

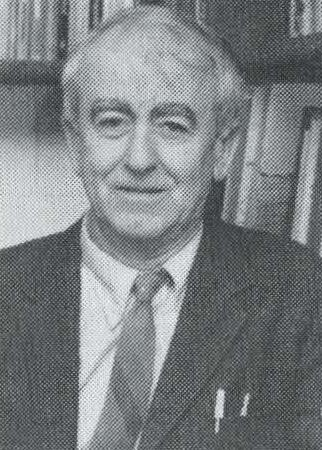
- Anastaplo c. 1985
- Born: November 7, 1925
- Died: February 14, 2014 (aged 88); Chicago, Illinois
- Occupations: Professor and author
- Known for: Supreme Court case, In re Anastaplo

George Anastaplo (November 7, 1925 – February 14, 2014) was a professor at Loyola University Chicago School of Law and author who was famously denied admission for many years to the Illinois Bar. The denial of his admission became a Supreme Court case, In re Anastaplo, in which he insisted that the First Amendment of the U.S. Constitution protects the privacy of political affiliations, specifically, his refusal to answer questions about membership in the Communist Party. Anastaplo's stand was based on constitutional principles and his consequent rejection of McCarthyism, and nobody alleged that he had been a member of the Communist Party. The Supreme Court's majority upheld the lower courts' ruling in favor of the Illinois Bar, with Justice Hugo Black dissenting. After his Supreme Court case and denial of admission to the Bar, Anastaplo supported his family by teaching at the University of Chicago and other universities and colleges. He wrote many articles and books on philosophy, many of which acknowledged the influence of his teacher, Leo Strauss.

== Early life ==
The son of Greek immigrants, Anastaplo served in the United States Army Air Corps during World War II as a navigator of B-17s and B-29s. After the war he attended the University of Chicago where he earned his B.A. in 1948 and his J.D. in 1951. Even while a law student, Anastaplo attended the lectures and seminars of Leo Strauss.

== Illinois Bar Exam ==
After he had passed the Bar Exam, Anastaplo was asked a series of questions typical during the age of the Red Scare. He was asked whether members of the Communist Party should be allowed to enter the Bar and so be able to practice law, to which he replied yes. This prompted a series of questions where the interviewers asked him about the nature of Communism in America to which he retorted that political dissent and even the right of revolution were part of the American constitutional heritage. When asked whether he was a Communist, Anastaplo replied that freedom of association was guaranteed by the First Amendment, and that it was improper for the Bar to ask about political affiliations of applicants.

He continued to refuse to answer the question and eventually sued the Bar association, which countersued him. Almost a decade later the case reached the Supreme Court. In 1961 Professor Leo Strauss bolstered Anastaplo's spirits when he was petitioning for admission to the Illinois Bar by writing the two-sentence letter: "This is only to pay you my respects for your brave and just action. If the American Bench and Bar have any sense of shame they must come on their knees to apologize to you."

== Supreme Court ==
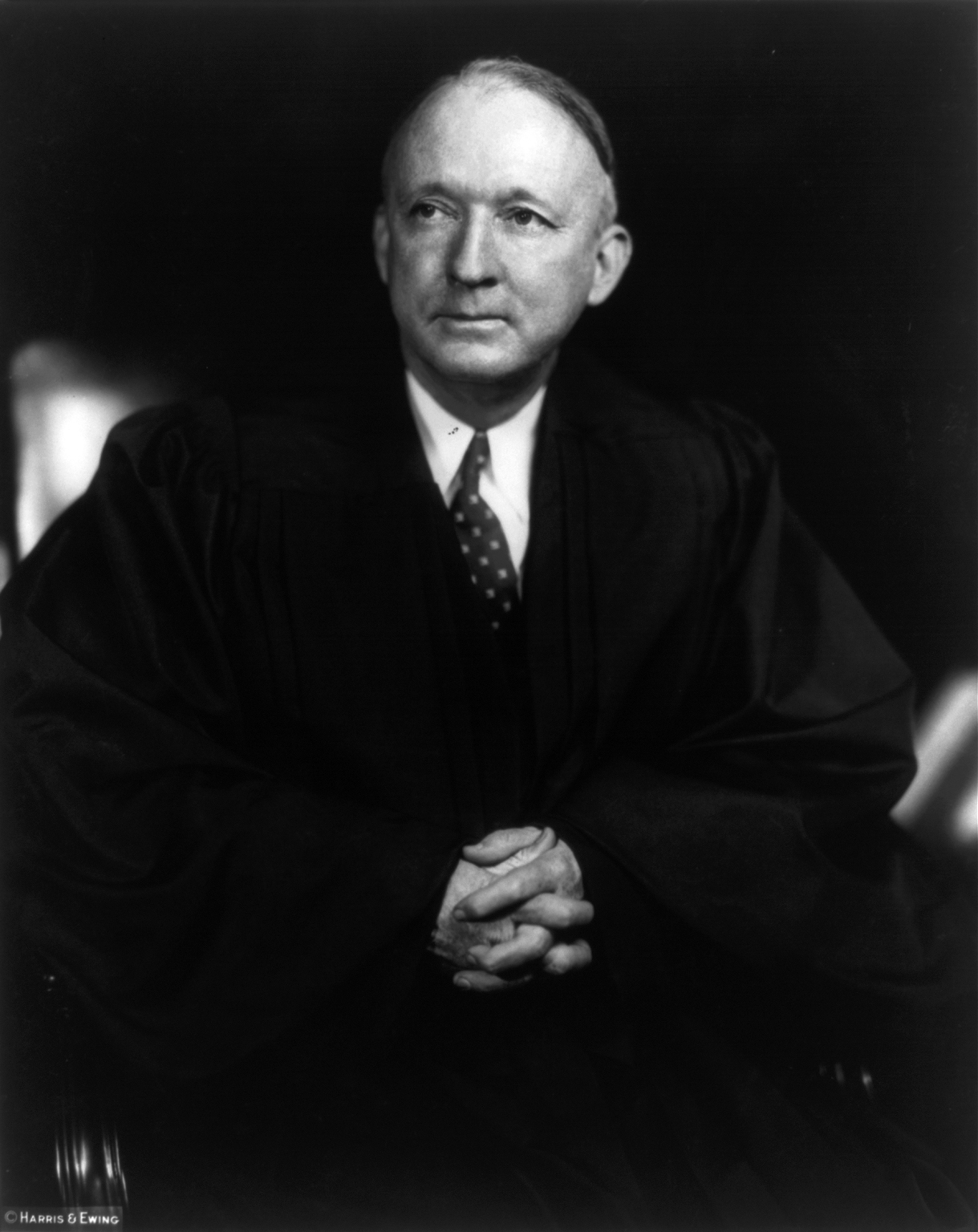
Justice Hugo Black's dissent In re Anastaplo would "immortalize Anastaplo", said Justice Brennan upon reading it. Black's dissent was read at Black's funeral, by his instructions.

Anastaplo argued his case himself before the U.S. Supreme Court, losing the case but praised by Justice Hugo Black in his dissent:

The effect of the Court's 'balancing' here is that any State may now reject an applicant for admission to the Bar if he believes in the Declaration of Independence as strongly as Anastaplo and if he is willing to sacrifice his career and his means of livelihood in defense of the freedoms of the First Amendment. But the men who founded this country and wrote our Bill of Rights were strangers neither to a belief in the 'right of revolution' nor to the urgency of the need to be free from the control of government with regard to political beliefs and associations. Thomas Jefferson was not disclaiming a belief in the 'right of revolution' when he wrote the Declaration of Independence. And Patrick Henry was certainly not disclaiming such a belief when he declared in impassioned words that have come on down through the years: 'Give me liberty or give me death.' This country's freedom was won by men who, whether they believed in it or not, certainly practiced revolution in the Revolutionary War.

Since the beginning of history there have been governments that have engaged in practices against the people so bad, so cruel, so unjust and so destructive of the individual dignity of men and women that the 'right of revolution' was all the people had left to free themselves. As simple illustrations, one government almost 2,000 years ago burned Christians upon fiery crosses and another government, during this very century, burned Jews in crematories. I venture the suggestion that there are countless multitudes in this country, and all over the world, who would join Anastaplo's belief in the right of the people to resist by force tyrannical governments like those.

In saying what I have, it is to be borne in mind that Anastaplo has not indicated, even remotely, a belief that this country is an oppressive one in which the 'right of revolution' should be exercised. Quite the contrary, the entire course of his life, as disclosed by the record, has been one of devotion and service to his country-first, in his willingness to defend its security at the risk of his own life in time of war and, later, in his willingness to defend its freedoms at the risk of his professional career in time of peace. The one and only time in which he has come into conflict with the Government is when he refused to answer the questions put to him by the Committee about his beliefs and associations. And I think the record clearly shows that conflict resulted, not from any fear on Anastaplo's part to divulge his own political activities, but from a sincere, and in my judgment correct, conviction that the preservation of this country's freedom depends upon adherence to our Bill of Rights. The very most that can fairly be said against Anastaplo's position in this entire matter is that he took too much of the responsibility of preserving that freedom upon himself.

This case illustrates to me the serious consequences to the Bar itself of not affording the full protections of the First Amendment to its applicants for admission. For this record shows that Anastaplo has many of the qualities that are needed in the American Bar. It shows, not only that Anastaplo has followed a high moral, ethical and patriotic course in all of the activities of his life, but also that he combines these more common virtues with the uncommon virtue of courage to stand by his principles at any cost. It is such men as these who have most greatly honored the profession of the law-men like Malsherbes, who, at the cost of his own life and the lives of his family, sprang unafraid to the defense of Louis XVI against the fanatical leaders of the Revolutionary government of France---men like Charles Evans Hughes, Sr., later Mr. Chief Justice Hughes, who stood up for the constitutional rights of socialists to be socialists and public officials despite the threats and clamorous protests of self-proclaimed superpatriots---men like Charles Evans Hughes, Jr., and John W. Davis, who, while against everything for which the Communists stood, strongly advised the Congress in 1948 that it would be unconstitutional to pass the law then proposed to outlaw the Communist Party---men like Lord Erskine, James Otis, Clarence Darrow, and the multitude of others who have dared to speak in defense of causes and clients without regard to personal danger to themselves. The legal profession will lose much of its nobility and its glory if it is not constantly replenished with lawyers like these. To force the Bar to become a group of thoroughly orthodox, time-serving, government-fearing individuals is to humiliate and degrade it.

But that is the present trend, not only in the legal profession but in almost every walk of life. Too many men are being driven to become government-fearing and time-serving because the Government is being permitted to strike out at those who are fearless enough to think as they please and say what they think. This trend must be halted if we are to keep faith with the Founders of our Nation and pass on to future generations of Americans the great heritage of freedom which they sacrificed so much to leave to us. The choice is clear to me. If we are to pass on that great heritage of freedom, we must return to the original language of the Bill of Rights. We must not be afraid to be free. (Footnotes removed)

Upon reading Black's dissent, Justice William J. Brennan said that it would "immortalize Anastaplo." Black's dissent was read at Black's funeral, by his instructions.

== Aftermath ==
Although he had lost the case, he became a figure of American liberty everywhere. He was described as the "Socrates of Chicago". He spoke all around the country about the importance of liberties. He taught liberal arts courses for nearly sixty years at the University of Chicago's Graham School of Continuing Liberal and Professional Studies. He also taught at Rosary College and the University of Dallas. He eventually became a professor at Loyola University Chicago School of Law. He also authored books that outline his experience and the impact it had.

== Death ==
Anastaplo, a resident of Hyde Park, Chicago, died February 14, 2014, of prostate cancer. He was survived by his wife of 65 years, Sara Jacqueline Prince Anastaplo, four children (Helen Scharbach Newlin (née Helen Margaret Anastaplo), George Malcolm Davidson Anastaplo, Miriam Irene Redleaf (née Sara Maria Anastaplo), and Theodora McShan Anastaplo), and eight grandchildren.

== Books ==
- The Bible: Respectful Readings (Lexington Books, 2008)
- Reflections on Freedom of Speech and the First Amendment (University Press of Kentucky, 2007)
- Plato's Meno: Translation and Commentary (Focus Publishing, 2006)
- The Constitutionalist: Notes on the First Amendment (Lexington Books, 2005)
- On Trial: From Adam & Eve to O.J. Simpson (Lexington Books, 2004)
- But Not Philosophy: Seven Introductions to Non-Western Thought (Lexington Books, 2002)
- Abraham Lincoln: A Constitutional Biography (Rowmen & Littlefield, 1999)
- Liberty, Equality & Modern Constitutionalism: A Source Book (Focus Publ., 1999)
- Campus Hate-Speech Codes, Natural Right, and Twentieth Century Atrocities (Edwin Mellen Press, 1999)
- Campus Hate-Speech Codes and Twentieth Century Atrocities (Edwin Mellen Press, 1997)
- The Thinker as Artist: From Homer to Plato & Aristotle (Ohio University Press, 1997)
- The Amendments to the Constitution: A Commentary (Johns Hopkins University Press, 1995)
- The American Moralist: On Law, Ethics and Government (Swallow Press/Ohio University Press, 1992)
- The Constitution of 1787: A Commentary (Johns Hopkins University Press, 1989)
- The Artist As Thinker: From Shakespeare to Joyce (Ohio University Press, 1983)
- Human Being and Citizen: Essays on Virtue, Freedom, and the Common Good (Swallow Press, 1975)

== See also ==
- Ronald Collins & Sam Chaltain, We Must not be Afraid to be Free: Stories of Free Expression in America 4-16 (Oxford University Press, 2011) (account of GA and his case)
- Leo Strauss's students, about whom Anastaplo has written essays:
  - Allan Bloom
  - Harry Jaffa
- Sidney Hook, Philosopher who corresponded with Anastaplo on due process and Communists
