= List of United States Supreme Court cases, volume 401 =

This is a list of all the United States Supreme Court cases from volume 401 of the United States Reports:

Case name	Citation	Date decided
Baird v. State Bar of Arizona	401 U.S. 1	1971
In re Stolar	401 U.S. 23	1971
Younger v. Harris	401 U.S. 37	1971
Samuels v. Mackell	401 U.S. 66	1971
Boyle v. Landry	401 U.S. 77	1971
Perez v. Ledesma	401 U.S. 82	1971
Magnesium Casting Co. v. NLRB	401 U.S. 137	1971
Sanks v. Georgia	401 U.S. 144	1971
Law Students Civil Rights Research Council, Inc. v. Wadmond	401 U.S. 154	1971
Dyson v. Stein	401 U.S. 200	1971
Byrne v. Karalexis	401 U.S. 216	1971
Harris v. New York	401 U.S. 222	1971
Boilermakers v. Hardeman	401 U.S. 233	1971
United States v. Weller	401 U.S. 254	1971
Monitor Patriot Co. v. Roy	401 U.S. 265	1971
Time, Inc. v. Pape	401 U.S. 279	1971
Ocala Star-Banner Co. v. Damron	401 U.S. 295	1971
Ramsey v. Mine Workers	401 U.S. 302	1971
Zenith Radio Corp. v. Hazeltine Research, Inc.	401 U.S. 321	1971
Relford v. Commandant	401 U.S. 355	1971
Boddie v. Connecticut	401 U.S. 371	1971
Tate v. Short	401 U.S. 395	1971
Citizens to Preserve Overton Park, Inc. v. Volpe	401 U.S. 402	1971
Griggs v. Duke Power Co.	401 U.S. 424	1971
Gillette v. United States	401 U.S. 437	1971
Askew v. Hargrave	401 U.S. 476	1971
Grove Press, Inc. v. Md. Board of Censors	401 U.S. 480	1971
Durham v. United States (1971)	401 U.S. 481	1971
Mine Workers v. Railing	401 U.S. 486	1971
Schlanger v. Seamans	401 U.S. 487	1971
Ohio v. Wyandotte Chem. Corp.	401 U.S. 493	1971
United States v. Randall	401 U.S. 513	1971
United States v. Dist. Ct. I	401 U.S. 520	1971
United States v. Dist. Ct. II	401 U.S. 527	1971
Radich v. New York	401 U.S. 531	1971
Labine v. Vincent	401 U.S. 532	1971
Whiteley v. Warden	401 U.S. 560	1971
Transp. Union v. State Bar of Mich.	401 U.S. 576	1971
United States v. Freed	401 U.S. 601	1971
Investment Co. Inst. v. Camp	401 U.S. 617	1971
Williams v. United States	401 U.S. 646	1971
Mackey v. United States	401 U.S. 667	1971
United States v. U.S. Coin & Currency	401 U.S. 715	1971
United States v. White	401 U.S. 745	1971
Hill v. California	401 U.S. 797	1971
Rewis v. United States	401 U.S. 808	1971
Rogers v. Bellei	401 U.S. 815	1971
Johnson v. United States (1971)	401 U.S. 846	1971
Kitchens v. Smith	401 U.S. 847	1971
Jackson v. Indiana	401 U.S. 973	1971
Karr v. Schmidt	401 U.S. 1201	1971
Haywood v. NBA	401 U.S. 1204	1971
