= Baird v. State Bar of Arizona =

- Supreme Court of the United States

Argued December 8–9, 1969 Reargued October 14, 1970 Decided February 23, 1971
- Full case name: Baird v. State Bar of Arizona
- Citations: 401 U.S. 1 (more) 91 S.Ct. 702; 27 L. Ed. 2d 639; 1971 U.S. LEXIS 81

Holding
- A State's power to inquire about a person's beliefs or associations is limited by the First Amendment, which prohibits a State from excluding a person from a profession solely because of membership in a political organization or because of his beliefs.

Court membership
- Chief Justice Warren E. Burger Associate Justices Hugo Black · William O. Douglas; John M. Harlan II · William J. Brennan Jr. Potter Stewart · Byron White; Thurgood Marshall · Harry Blackmun

Case opinions
- Plurality: Black, joined by Douglas, Brennan, Marshall
- Concurrence: Stewart
- Dissent: Harlan
- Dissent: White
- Dissent: Blackmun, joined by Burger, Harlan, White

Baird v. State Bar of Arizona, 401 U.S. 1 (1971), was a United States Supreme Court case in which the Court ruled:

A State's power to inquire about a person's beliefs or associations is limited by the First Amendment, which prohibits a State from excluding a person from a profession solely because of membership in a political organization or because of his beliefs.

In this case, a law school graduate who had passed the Arizona written bar examination had applied to be admitted to the Arizona bar, but had refused to answer a question as to whether she had ever been a member of the Communist party. On that basis, the State Bar of Arizona refused to admit her.

== See also ==
- State Bar of Arizona
