= Staples v. United States =

- Supreme Court of the United States

Argued November 30, 1993 Decided May 23, 1994
- Full case name: Harold E Staples III v. United States
- Citations: 511 U.S. 600 (more)

Holding
- A conviction of possessing an unregistered machine gun requires mens rea in that the defendant knew the weapon was fully automatic.

Court membership
- Chief Justice William Rehnquist Associate Justices Harry Blackmun · John P. Stevens; Sandra Day O'Connor · Antonin Scalia; Anthony Kennedy · David Souter; Clarence Thomas · Ruth Bader Ginsburg

Case opinions
- Majority: Thomas, joined by Rehnquist, Scalia, Kennedy, Souter
- Concurrence: Ginsburg (in judgment), joined by O'Connor
- Dissent: Stevens, joined by Blackmun

Laws applied
- National Firearms Act

Staples v. United States, 511 U.S. 600 (1994), was a case where the United States Supreme Court ruled that the crime of possessing an unregistered machine gun requires knowledge that the firearm is a machine gun under the National Firearms Act.

== Background ==
During a search warrant on Harold Staples' residence by the BATF, agents recovered an AR-15 rifle with a filed metal stop (that normally prevents an M16 selector switch from rotating to the full auto position) and several M16 parts. The agents testified that the rifle fired multiple shots on one trigger pull when testing it. Staples testified that the rifle only fired in semiautomatic mode (with frequent stoppages) when it was in his possession. The trial court rejected his request to include a defense of ignorance in the jury instructions, and he was subsequently convicted. The United States Court of Appeals for the Tenth Circuit affirmed his conviction, claiming that proving a defendant possessed knowledge of a weapon's physical properties was not necessary in proving guilt.

== Decision ==
In a 7-2 opinion delivered by Justice Clarence Thomas, the Court ruled that due to historical tradition of private individuals owning firearms, guns are not as dangerous as hard drugs or hand grenades. In the case of the latter, such "public welfare" offenses consider mens rea as the knowledge that the defendant was selling or possessing such items. Therefore, possessing an unregistered machine gun requires the defendant's knowledge that the firearm fired more than one shot per trigger pull when in their possession.

=== Stevens' dissent ===
Justice John P. Stevens, joined by Justice Harry Blackmun, dissented; Stevens argued that the NFA was intended to be a public welfare law, and that machine guns are not commonly owned by civilians.
