= Short-barrelled shotgun =

Type of shotgun

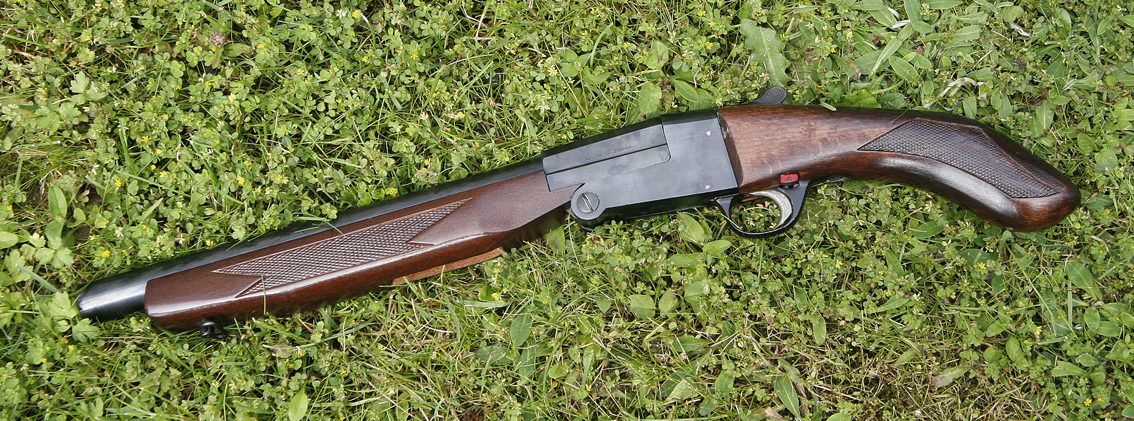
A sawn-off break-action shotgun of the type commonly known as a lupara

A short-barrelled shotgun (SBS), also called a scattergun, shorty, or boom stick, is a type of shotgun with a shorter gun barrel—typically under 18 inches (46 cm)—and often a pistol grip instead of a longer shoulder stock. When shortened by cutting with a saw, these are colloquially termed sawn-off shotguns or sawed-off shotguns. Barrels can be manufactured at shorter lengths as an alternative to traditional, longer barrels. This makes them easier to transport and conceal due to their smaller profile and lighter weight. The design also makes the weapon more portable when maneuvering in confined spaces and for that reason law enforcement and military personnel find it useful in close-quarters combat scenarios. As a result of the shorter barrel length, any shotgun with a tubular magazine will have a reduction in its magazine capacity.

In the 1930s, the United States, United Kingdom and Canada mandated that a permit be required to own these firearms. They are subject to legal restrictions depending upon jurisdiction. They are used by military forces and police agencies worldwide.

== Description ==
Compared to a standard shotgun, the short-barrelled shotgun has a shorter effective range, due to a lower muzzle velocity; however, its reduced length makes it easier to maneuver and conceal. Powerful and compact, the weapon is especially suitable for use in small spaces, such as close-quarters combat in a military context. Military vehicle crews use short-barrelled combat shotguns as ancillary weapons. In urban combat zones, military entry teams often use entry shotguns when breaching and entering doorways.

Many jurisdictions have a minimum legal length for shotgun barrels to make these more concealable shotguns unavailable for criminal purposes. Many gun makers in the U.S. have not offered sawn-off shotguns to the public since 1934, when shotguns with barrel lengths of under 18 inches were restricted, although they had previously been sold. To abide by NFA regulations, anyone may complete a Form 1 "making" form, and have the approved tax stamp for the shotgun in question, in order to legally reduce its barrel length to less than 18 inches by cutting the barrel or replacing it with a shorter one.

A sawn-off shotgun is often an unofficial modification of a standard shotgun. In countries where handguns are more costly or difficult to obtain, criminals can convert legally purchased or stolen shotguns into concealable weapons.

The term is often applied to illegal weapons that are created by cutting off the barrel of a standard shotgun. The barrel of a shotgun without a tube magazine can be cut to any length; pump-action or semi-automatic shotguns usually have a tube magazine attached to the underside of the barrel which limits the practical minimum barrel length to about the length of the magazine tube, unless it also is modified, technically much more challenging than shortening the barrel. Repeating-fire shotguns with box magazines do not lose shell capacity when sawn off, but they are far less common than those with tubular magazines. Shotguns manufactured with barrels under the legal minimum length frequently fall into special categories.

== Legal restrictions ==
Many nations have placed legal restrictions on short-barrelled or sawn-off shotguns due to their concealability. The following are the restrictions for specific nations. Although not listed here, they are also subject to laws governing guns in general.

=== Australia ===
In the state of Victoria a shotgun may not have its barrel shortened so as to change the category under which that shotgun would be classified. In some states, any alteration to the length of the barrel requires permission from the Chief Commissioner of Police.

=== Canada ===
Short-barrelled, manually operated shotguns (non-semi-automatics) only require a non-restricted class licence as long as the barrel remains unmodified from the original factory length. There is no legal minimum for shotgun barrels as long as they are not handguns; shotguns with barrels as short as 8.5 inches are available in Canada.

The act of reducing the length of the barrel of a shotgun to less than 457 mm (18 inches) by sawing, cutting, or "otherwise", by anyone other than a recognized gun manufacturer, is prohibited.

=== Czech Republic ===
Czech Firearms Act classifies shotguns with a barrel of up to 300mm or overal length of up to 600mm as category R3 Firearm (e.g. same as pistols or modern sporting rifles), the acquisition, possession and carrying of which requires a firearms authorization.

=== Germany ===
In Germany, the possession of a sawn-off shotgun is legal with a firearms license (Waffenbesitzkarte), just like any other firearm. Restrictions only apply to pump-action shotguns, which require a minimum barrel length of 45 cm and a minimum overall length of 90 cm to be legal. Other shotguns may be of any length. If the barrel length is less than 30 cm or the overall length is less than 60 cm, the firearm is considered a handgun, and treated accordingly under the law.

=== Ireland ===
Shortening the barrel of a shotgun or rifle results in a presumptive five-year minimum sentence of imprisonment upon conviction for a first offence, and a mandatory five-year sentence for second or subsequent offences.

=== Russia ===
On 13 December 1996, president of the Russian Federation, Boris Yeltsin, signed the federal law No. 150, which entered into force on 1 July 1997. In accordance with this law, possession of any firearm with a barrel length of less than 500 mm and an overall length of less than 800 mm (including sawn-off rifles and sawn-off shotguns) was prohibited. As a result, since 1 July 1997, sawn-off shotguns and sawn-off rifles were banned on the territory of the Russian Federation and they had to be handed over to government law enforcement agencies for destruction.

=== United Kingdom ===
Within the United Kingdom, side-by-side, over-under, bolt-action and lever-action shotguns are required to conform to the specification of a 24-inch minimum barrel length if held on a shotgun certificate. If held on a firearms certificate, the applicant having demonstrated 'good reason' for possession, they must comply with the standard configuration of 12-inch minimum barrel length, 24-inch minimum overall length, in common with other Section 1 firearms.

Shotguns held on a shotgun certificate must either have no magazine, or a non-removable magazine capable of holding no more than two rounds. Shotguns held on firearms certificates are not subject to any magazine restrictions.

Semi-automatic and pump-action shotguns, whether held on shotgun or firearms certificates, are always required to comply with the specification of 24-inch minimum barrel length, 40-inch minimum overall length.

Muzzleloading firearms held on firearms certificates are exempt from any restrictions on barrel and overall length. A smoothbore muzzleloader held on a shotgun certificate would be subject to the standard 24-inch minimum barrel length specification.

=== USSR ===
Changing the length of the barrel of a firearm was not prohibited. It was possible to buy, sell or own old smooth-bore hunting shotguns with already shortened barrels (if the barrel length is at least 500 mm). Owners were allowed to shorten the buttstock or barrel of their hunting shotgun or rifle if they do it in a gun workshop. It was allowed to re-equip shotguns with pistol grip and detachable buttstock. Firearms with a barrel length of less than 500 mm were illegal and had to be confiscated.

=== United States ===
Under the National Firearms Act (NFA), it is illegal for a private citizen to possess a sawn-off modern smokeless powder shotgun (a shotgun with a barrel length shorter than 18 inches (46 cm) or a minimum overall length of the weapon, total, including the 18-inch minimum barrel, of under 26 inches (66 cm)) (under U.S.C. Title II), without a tax-paid registration from the Bureau of Alcohol, Tobacco, Firearms and Explosives, requiring a background check and a $5 tax for every transfer, depending upon the specific manufacturing circumstances of the particular sawn-off modern shotgun being transferred. Gun trusts have become an increasingly popular means of registering SBSs with the BATFE. Short-barrelled muzzleloading blackpowder shotguns are not illegal under federal law, and require no tax-stamped permit, although they may be illegal under state law. As with all NFA regulated firearms, a new tax stamp must be purchased before every transfer. All transfers must be facilitated through a Federal Firearms Licensee (FFL).

On October 9th, 2026, the BATFE made a press release stating that they would no longer enforce tax stamps and registration of SBSs following the ruling in Silencer Shop Foundation v. Bureau of Alcohol, Tobacco, Firearms and Explosives.

In the US, shotguns originally manufactured without shoulder stocks (and thus not legally shotguns), with a total length under 26 inches, are classified as an "Any Other Weapon" by the BATFE and have a $5 transfer tax, if they are manufactured by a maker possessing the appropriate Class 2 Special Occupational Taxpayer Federal Firearms License. In order to convert an existing shoulder-stocked shotgun to a short-barrelled shotgun or an existing pistol-grip-only shotgun to an "Any Other Weapon", a private citizen must pay the standard $200 NFA tax.

== Police and military use ==
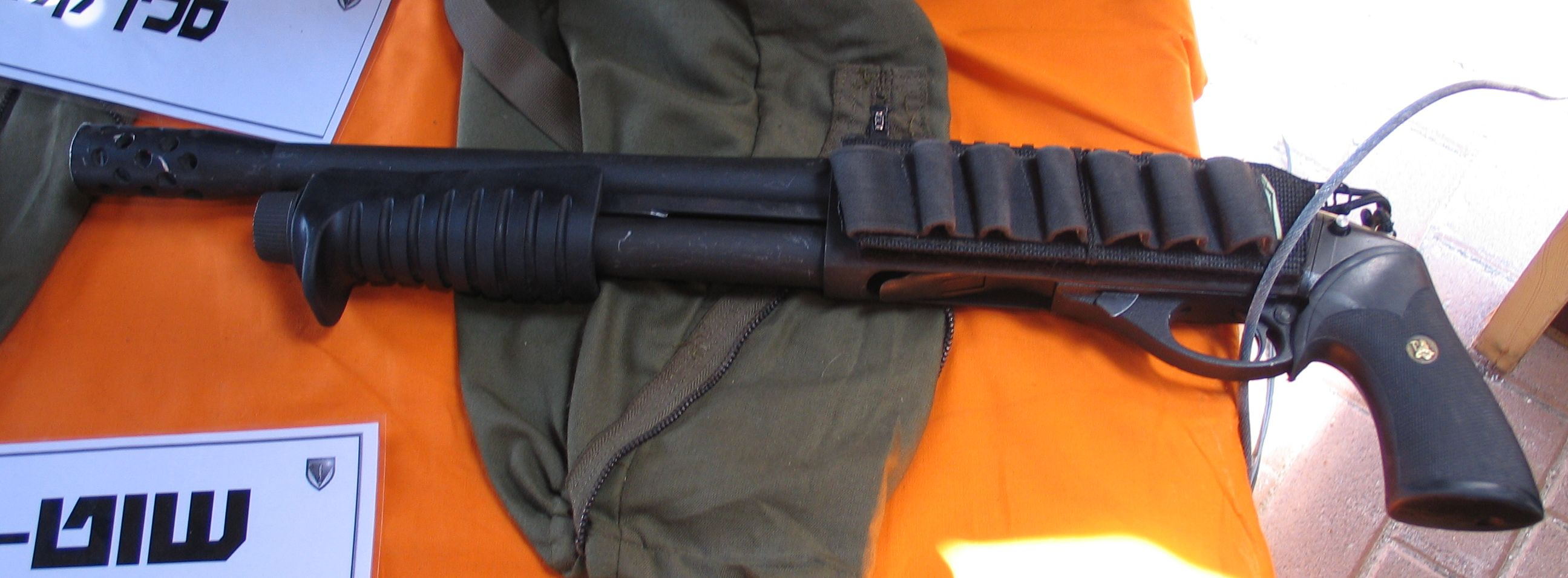
This short-barrelled shotgun was manufactured with a reduced-length barrel, rather than being modified after its manufacture.

Historical military use of sawn-off shotguns includes use as a primary weapon for Confederate cavalry during the American Civil War. These muzzle-loaded weapons were used primarily for close-range combat and to supplement the availability of more traditional short-range weapons such as the saber or carbine. The availability of the source weapons and the ability to use a single ball, shot, or a mix of both as the situation required were reasons why they were initially desired by those establishing Confederate cavalry units. They were replaced over time as more conventional arms became available and as the tactical use of cavalry shifted towards use as mounted infantry.

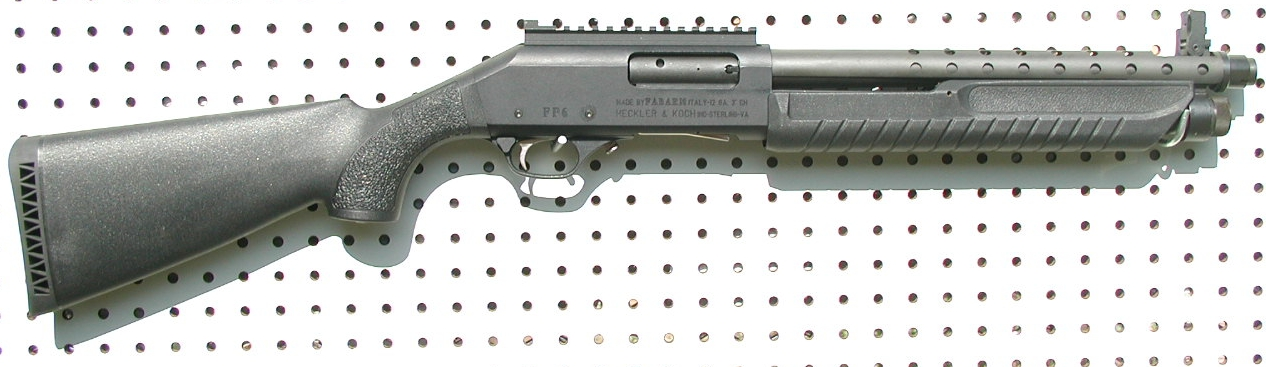
Fabarm FP6 Entry – features a 14-inch barrel and is classified as a short-barrelled shotgun in the U.S.A.

In modern usage, minimum length and barrel length restrictions only apply to civilian use; military and police departments may issue short-barrelled shotguns, and major manufacturers offer special models with barrels in the range of 10 to 14 inches (25 to 36 cm) as riot shotguns or combat shotguns for use in areas with restricted space. These are generally referred to as "entry shotguns", because they are often used for forcing entry into buildings, where the short easy handling is more important than the increased ammunition capacity of a longer shotgun. Breaching rounds provide another use for very short shotguns. These rounds are usually made of sintered powdered metal, but a normal buckshot or bird shot round will also work. A shotgun is used for breaching by placing the gun next to a door lock (0 to 2 inches away, 0 to 5 cm), and firing at a 45 degrees downward angle through the door between the lock or latch and the door frame. The impact of the projectile(s) opens a hole through the door, removing the latch or locking bolt. When through the door, the shot or sintered metal disperses quickly, and because it was aimed downwards, the risk of harming occupants on the other side of the breached door is minimized. Breaching guns used by police and the military may have barrels as short as 10 inches (25 cm), and they often have only a pistol grip rather than a full butt stock. Some models use a special cup-like muzzle extension to further minimize the risk of debris injuring the shooter. Because few rounds are fired, any sporting shotgun with a 3-round capacity could be shortened and used as a capable breaching shotgun.

== Barrel length and shot spread ==
It is a common misconception that shortening the length of a shotgun barrel itself significantly affects the pattern or spread of the pellets; this only becomes true when the barrel is reduced to less than 50% of a typical length. A standard-length barrel (e.g. 30 inches [76 cm]) is this long to move the center of gravity of the firearm away from the body and give it an ergonomic heft, and in order for the barrel to extend out into the shooter's field of vision right up to the target, as well as to make the weapon safer, as it is difficult to inadvertently point a long gun at one's own body. The pattern is primarily affected by the type of cartridge fired and the choke, or constriction normally found at the muzzle of a shotgun barrel.

The primary reason that the pattern is altered is because cutting off the end of the barrel removes the choke, which generally only extends about two inches (5.1 cm) inward from the muzzle. This results in a cylinder bore, which causes the widest spread generally found in shotgun barrels (see choke for more information on the impact of chokes, shotgun shell for information on spreader loads, and details on shot patterning for other relevant information). However, many qualified gunsmiths can re-tap and reinstall the choke in the shortened barrel.

== Civilian use ==
A sawn-off shotgun with exposed, manually cocked hammers and dual triggers is known as a lupara ("wolf-shot") in Italy and, while associated with organized crime, was originally used by Sicilian farmers and shepherds to protect their vineyards and flocks of animals. In rural areas of North India, where it is seen as a weapon of authority and prestige, it is known as a dunali, literally meaning "two pipes". It is especially common in Bihar, Purvanchal, Uttar Pradesh, Haryana and Punjab.

The light weight of short-barrelled shotguns, particularly in configurations that lack substantial stocks, leads some users to use short "minishells" with lower shot and powder loading for comfortable casual use.

== Criminal use ==
In the United Kingdom, Australia, Canada, and New Zealand, where handguns are not easily obtainable, the sawn-off shotgun was a common weapon in armed robberies during and shortly after the 1960s. This use has become the main association with the weapon.

The American bank robber Clyde Barrow modified his Browning A-5 shotgun by cutting the barrel down to the same length as the magazine tube, and shortening the stock by 5 to 6 inches (125 to 150 mm) to make it more concealable. A small, 10–12-inch (250–300 mm) strap was attached to both ends of the butt of the gun, and was looped around his shoulder, concealing the gun between his arm and chest under his jacket in the manner of a shoulder holster. The gun was drawn up quickly and fired from the shoulder under which it was carried. Barrow dubbed it the "Whippit", as he was able to "whip it" out easily.

Randy Weaver, a central actor in the 1992 Ruby Ridge standoff, agreed to sell two sawed-off shotguns to an undercover ATF agent in 1989.

Eric Harris and Dylan Klebold, the perpetrators of the Columbine High School massacre, had sawn off their Savage Arms 67H pump action shotgun and Stevens 311D double barrel shotgun in the months prior to conceal them under their duster coats on the day of the massacre.

== Derived uses ==
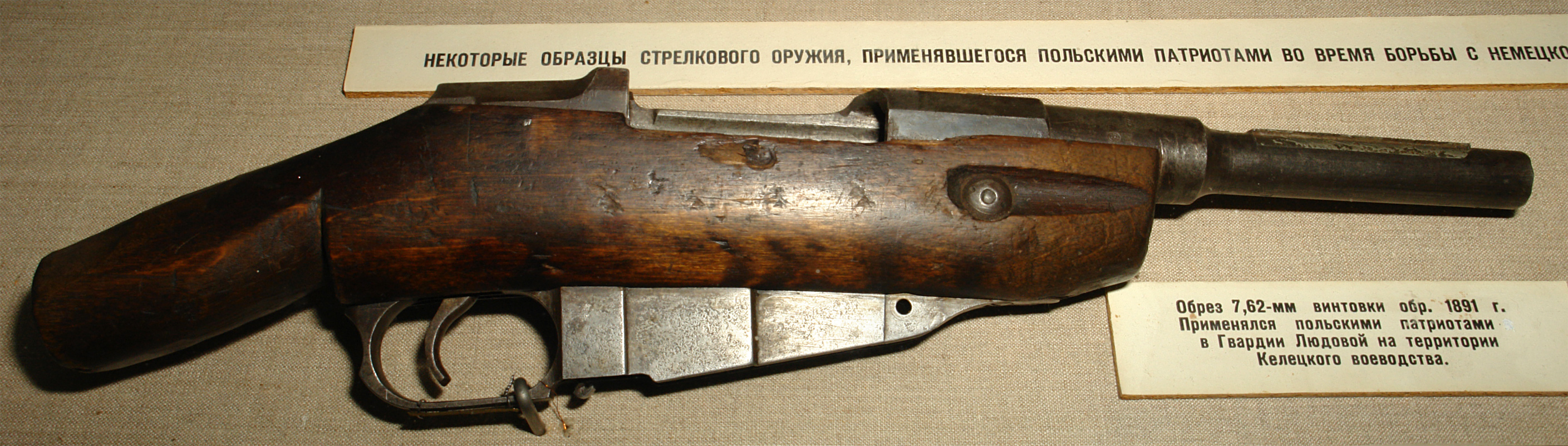
A sawed-off Mosin–Nagant rifle. Nicknamed Obrez (Обрез).

Outside area weapons such as shotguns, sawed-off barrels have been used on other firearms such as rifles and in some cases even pistols usually for concealment in particular by criminals and insurgents. Although it can reduce the weight of the weapon, it can waste propellant, cause huge muzzle blasts affecting target acquisition, give away position of the user and decrease accuracy of the ranged weapon.

Familiarity with descriptions and images of sawed-off shotguns via crime reports in the public media has led to "sawed-off" or "sawn-off" being used sometimes colloquially as "small or stripped version of"; such as the Sawn-Off Daimler (SOD).

== See also ==
- Coach gun
- H&R Handy-Gun
- KAC Masterkey
- M26 Modular Accessory Shotgun System
- Marble Game Getter
- Serbu Super-Shorty
- Short-barrelled rifle
- Title II weapons
