= United States v. Freed =

- Supreme Court of the United States

Argued January 11, 1971 Decided April 5, 1971
- Full case name: United States v. Freed, et al.
- Citations: 401 U.S. 601 (more) 91 S. Ct. 1112; 28 L. Ed. 2d 356; 1971 U.S. LEXIS 57

Holding
- (1) The National Firearm Act's registration requirements do not implicate the Fifth Amendment's privilege against self incrimination. (2) The Act's restrictions against possession of unregistered firearms do not require specific intent.

Court membership
- Chief Justice Warren E. Burger Associate Justices Hugo Black · William O. Douglas; John M. Harlan II · William J. Brennan Jr. Potter Stewart · Byron White; Thurgood Marshall · Harry Blackmun

Case opinions
- Majority: Douglas, joined by Burger, Black, Harlan, Stewart, White, Marshall, and Blackmun
- Concurrence: Brennan (in judgment)

Laws applied
- U.S. Const. amend. V

United States v. Freed, 401 U.S. 601 (1971), was a United States Supreme Court case in which the Court held the National Firearms Act's registration requirements do not violate the Fifth Amendment to the United States Constitution. Additionally, the Court held that the Act's restrictions against a person's "receiv[ing] or possess[ing] a firearm which is not registered to him," did not require the recipient to have the specific intent to possess an unregistered firearm. Consequently, the Court ruled that the buyer of unregistered hand grenades was subject to criminal liability, despite a lack of a requirement that the defendant have had a "specific intent or knowledge that the hand grenades were unregistered."

== Decision of the Court ==
The Court concluded, "This is a regulatory measure in the interest of the public safety, which may well be premised on the theory that one would hardly be surprised to learn that possession of hand grenades is not an innocent act."
