= Short-barreled rifle =

Type of rifle

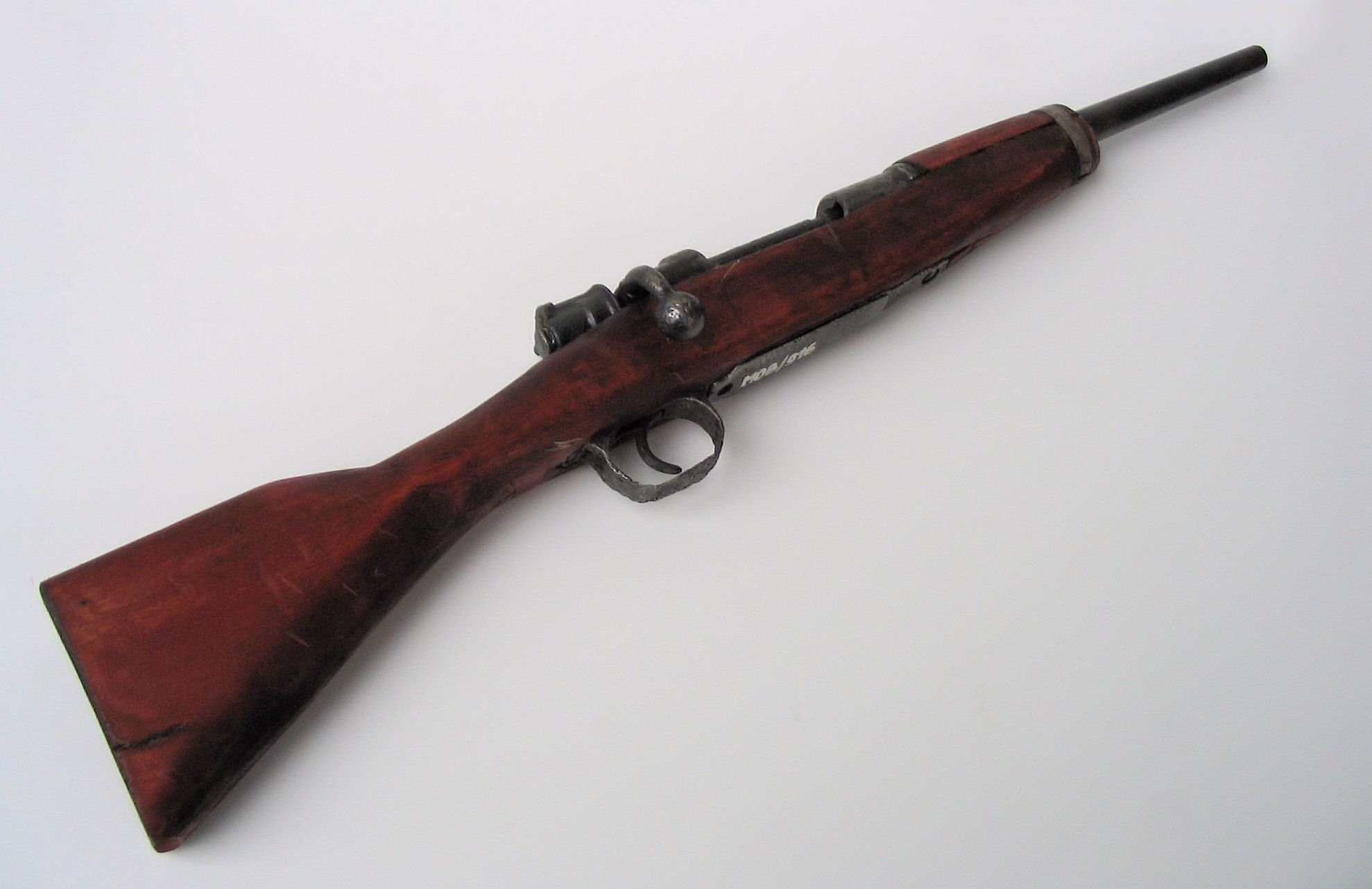
A "sawn-off" Mauser 98

Short-barreled rifle broadly refers to any rifle with an unusually short barrel. The term carbine describes a production rifle with a reduced barrel length for easier handling in confined spaces. Concern about concealment for illegal purposes has encouraged regulations specifying minimum barrel lengths and overall lengths.

== Measurement method ==
Barrel length is measured from the end of the muzzle to the front of the breechface, typically by inserting a measuring rod into the barrel. Barrel length may partially comprise a permanently attached muzzle accessory (such as a recoil compensator or flash suppressor). Overall length is measured between the extreme ends of the gun, along a centerline which passes through the middle of the barrel. For rifles fitted with folding or telescoping stocks (such as U.S. Carbine M1A1), US Federal guidelines state that measurement is performed with the stock unfolded as intended for use as a rifle. In some states, such as California and Michigan, the rifle's overall length is measured with the stock folded.

== Production ==
Short-barreled rifles can be created through end-user modification by trimming down a larger rifle, by building a rifle with an original barrel shorter than 16 in (41 cm), or by adding a shoulder stock to a handgun which is fitted with a barrel shorter than 16 in (41 cm), which would legally redefine it as a rifle rather than a handgun. In the United States, each of these processes must legally be accompanied by ATF registration.

Many older handguns originally designed with shoulder stocks, such as broomhandle Mausers, Lugers, Browning Hi-Power and Inglis as well as many lever action Winchesters with 14 to 15.5 in (36 to 39 cm) barrels, are considered relics instead of NFA restricted, and not regulated by federal SBR rules; however, they may still be subject to local laws. The ATF maintains a list of Curio & Relic of gun models and serial number ranges. While they are not considered NFA devices under the 1934 National Firearms Act, most are regulated by the Gun Control Act of 1968. Those made before 1899 and exempt in the ATF Curio and Relic list, are also exempt from the GCA.

=== Pistol brace ===
When used as designed, a pistol brace should only support the firearm by the shooter's forearm. According to the ATF, putting the pistol brace against one's shoulder does not constitute a redesign of the brace. It is based upon the item's manufacturer design and intent. This means registration is not required if a shooter intends to use a brace as a stock. Other jurisdictions, such as Canada, do not tend to have such rules.

On 31 January 2023 ATF published a 52-page regulation (Final Rule 2021R-08F) outlining a point-based worksheet of stabilizing brace criteria. Existing stabilizing braces not conforming to the new criteria were required to be registered by 23 May 2023. After that date, non-conforming stabilizing braces in the United States are regulated as short-barreled rifles. In Mock v Garland, the ATF was prohibited from enforcing this regulation in a decision issued in October 2023.

== Legislative history ==
British, American, and Canadian lawmakers tightened laws on concealable weapons in the 1930s.

=== United States ===
The United States' regulation of short-barreled rifles was the result of the National Firearms Act of 1934 which also imposed restrictions on short barreled shotguns, suppressors and machine guns. The reasoning for the restrictions on short-barrelled rifles and shotguns was not because they are more dangerous, but rather to prevent circumventing of the act's ban on handguns. However, the handgun ban was removed from the act prior to it being passed.

Short-barreled rifle (SBR) is a legal designation in the United States, referring to a shoulder-fired, rifled firearm, made from a rifle, with a barrel length of less than 16 in (41 cm) or overall length of less than 26 in (66 cm), or a handgun fitted with a buttstock and a barrel of less than 16 inches length. In the United States, an SBR is an item regulated by the Bureau of Alcohol, Tobacco, Firearms and Explosives (ATF) as a Title II weapon. In the absence of local laws prohibiting ownership, American civilians may own an SBR. Prior to October 9, 2026, the ATF required SBRs to be registered, and, prior to January 1, 2026, a $200 tax be paid. This tax was reduced to $0 as of January 1, 2026, under the One Big Beautiful Bill Act (OBBBA), which was enacted July 4th the previous year. This elimination of cost but retention of the paperwork was a compromise position taken up by the OBBBA, which originally included outright removal of SBRs and suppressors from the NFA in the version first passed by Congress. However, the Senate parliamentarian, the non–partisan referee of such things, determined removal was non–budgetary, and therefore not allowable in a reconciliation (budgetary) bill. In order to avoid needing 60 votes to pass, impossible with no Democratic Party members willing to vote against the party whip, the compromise was adopted and later confirmed in the House and signed into law.

It is a federal felony to possess an SBR in the USA unless it is registered with the ATF to the person who possesses it. Class 2 manufacturers, Class 3 dealers, and government agencies can transfer these firearms, tax exempt. The individual buyer or owner is responsible for paying the $200 tax (or at least filling in the forms from 2026 on) when purchasing, manufacturing, or transferring an SBR. They must also notify the ATF when transporting it across state lines.

As a result of the Supreme Court decision in United States v. Thompson/Center Arms Company, 504 U.S. 505 (1992), it is not illegal to possess a "kit" allowing a handgun to be fitted with a buttstock and with barrels both under and over the 16 inch minimum for a rifle, so long as the firearm is only assembled into legal (handgun with no buttstock, rifle with buttstock and 16 inch or longer barrel) configurations. Assembling the firearm into an NFA-regulated configuration (rifle with buttstock but barrel shorter than 16 inches) was a violation of the National Firearms Act.

On October 9, 2026, the ATF issued a press release stating that, due to the Silencer Shop Foundation v. Bureau of Alcohol, Tobacco, Firearms and Explosives ruling in August of the same year, they would no longer be enforcing the requirements to apply for, and be approved for, creation or ownership of SBRs.

=== Canada ===
Canadian regulations prohibit firearms adapted from a rifle or shotgun by sawing, cutting or any other alteration to an overall length less than 660 mm (26 in) or a barrel length less than 457 mm (18.0 in). Handguns with a barrel length less than 105 mm (4.1 in) are also prohibited.

Semi-automatic, centerfire firearms with a barrel shorter than 470mm (18.5 in) are restricted. Any firearm that can be fired in a folded configuration where the overall length is shorter than 660 mm (26 in) is restricted, however this minimum length does not apply to firearms that are not semi-automatic and centerfire and which do not fold or reduce in length in another way. Possessing a restricted firearm requires a restricted class licence (RPAL) and registration of the restricted firearm.

=== United Kingdom ===
United Kingdom regulations include among prohibited, without authority, firearms breechloading rifles with an overall fixed length less than 60 cm (24 in) or with a barrel length less than 30 cm (12 in). All such weapons are considered small firearms and are covered in general prohibition by Section 5 of the Firearms Act 1968.

=== Australia ===
Legally, most Australian legislation prescribes a minimum allowable barrel length which is typically about 330 mm (13 in) for rifles.

== See also ==
- Glossary of firearms terms
- Overview of gun laws by nation
- Title II weapons
