= Gun culture in the United States =

Behaviors and attitudes about firearms in the United States

Percent of households with guns in 2016. RAND Corporation.

Gun culture in the United States refers to the behaviors, attitudes, and beliefs surrounding the ownership and use of firearms by private citizens. Gun ownership is deeply rooted in the country's history and is legally protected by the Second Amendment to the United States Constitution. Firearms in the U.S. are commonly used for self-defense, hunting, and recreational activities.

Gun politics in the United States is highly polarized. Advocates of gun rights, typically aligned with conservative or libertarian views, emphasize the importance of the Second Amendment and oppose gun control. In contrast, those who support stricter gun control, often with more liberal perspectives, advocate for more regulations to protect human life and reduce gun violence. The gun culture in the United States is unique among developed nations due to the massive volume of firearms owned by civilians, the popularity of firearms for self-defense, hunting, and sporting activities, and a generally permissive regulatory environment.

== History ==
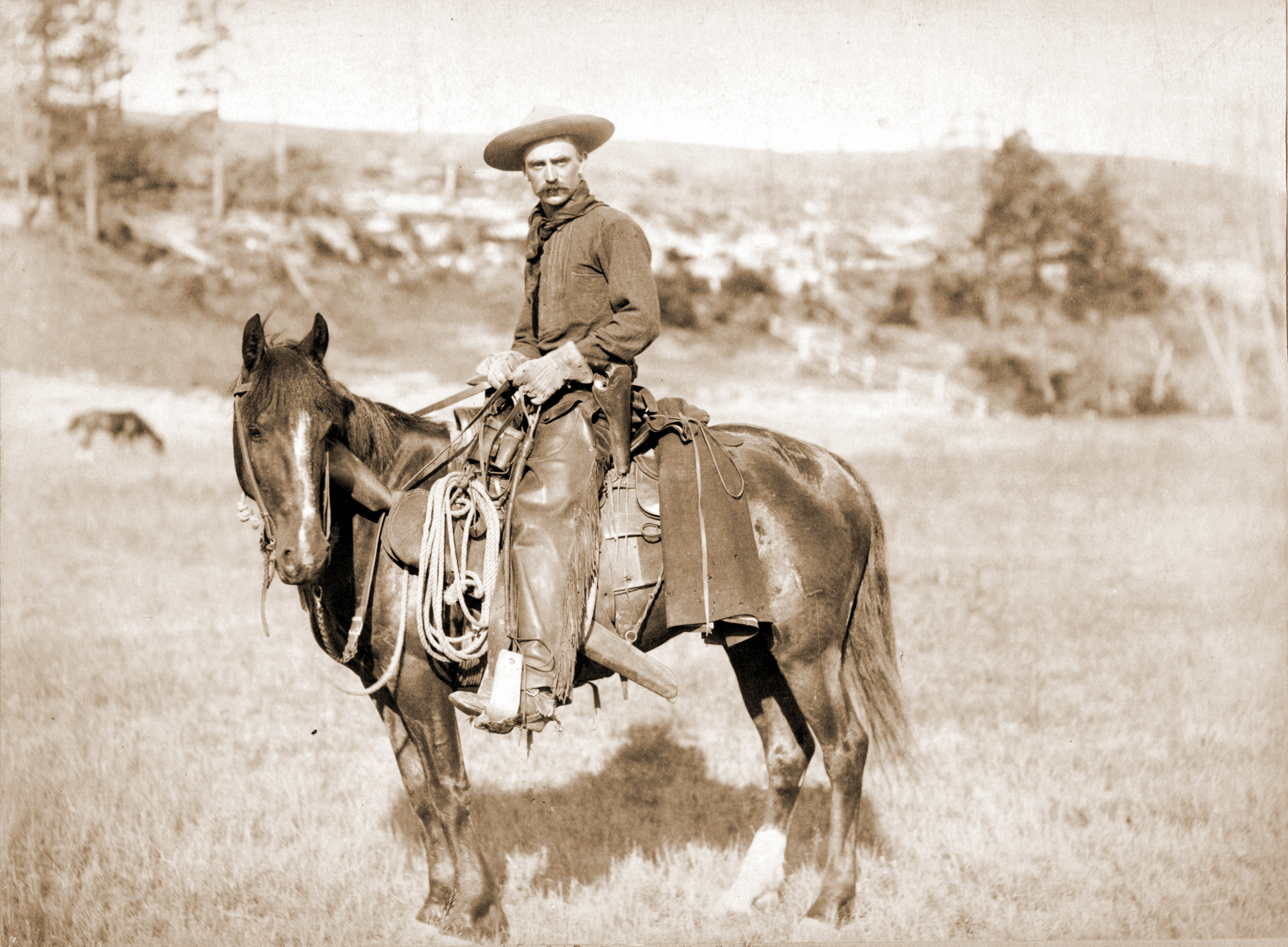
Firearms became readily identifiable symbols of westward expansion.

=== American militia culture ===
American attitudes on gun ownership date back to the American Revolutionary War, and also arise from traditions of hunting, militias, and frontier living.

Justifying the unique attitude toward gun ownership in the United States, James Madison wrote in Federalist No. 46, in 1788:

Those who are best acquainted with the last successful resistance of this country against the British arms, will be most inclined to deny the possibility of it. Besides the advantage of being armed, which the Americans possess over the people of almost every other nation, the existence of subordinate governments, to which the people are attached, and by which the militia officers are appointed, forms a barrier against the enterprises of ambition, more insurmountable than any which a simple government of any form can admit of. Notwithstanding the military establishments in the several kingdoms of Europe, which are carried as far as the public resources will bear, the governments are afraid to trust the people with arms. And it is not certain, that with this aid alone they would not be able to shake off their yokes. But were the people to possess the additional advantages of local governments chosen by themselves, who could collect the national will and direct the national force, and of officers appointed out of the militia, by these governments, and attached both to them and to the militia, it may be affirmed with the greatest assurance, that the throne of every tyranny in Europe would be speedily overturned in spite of the legions which surround it.

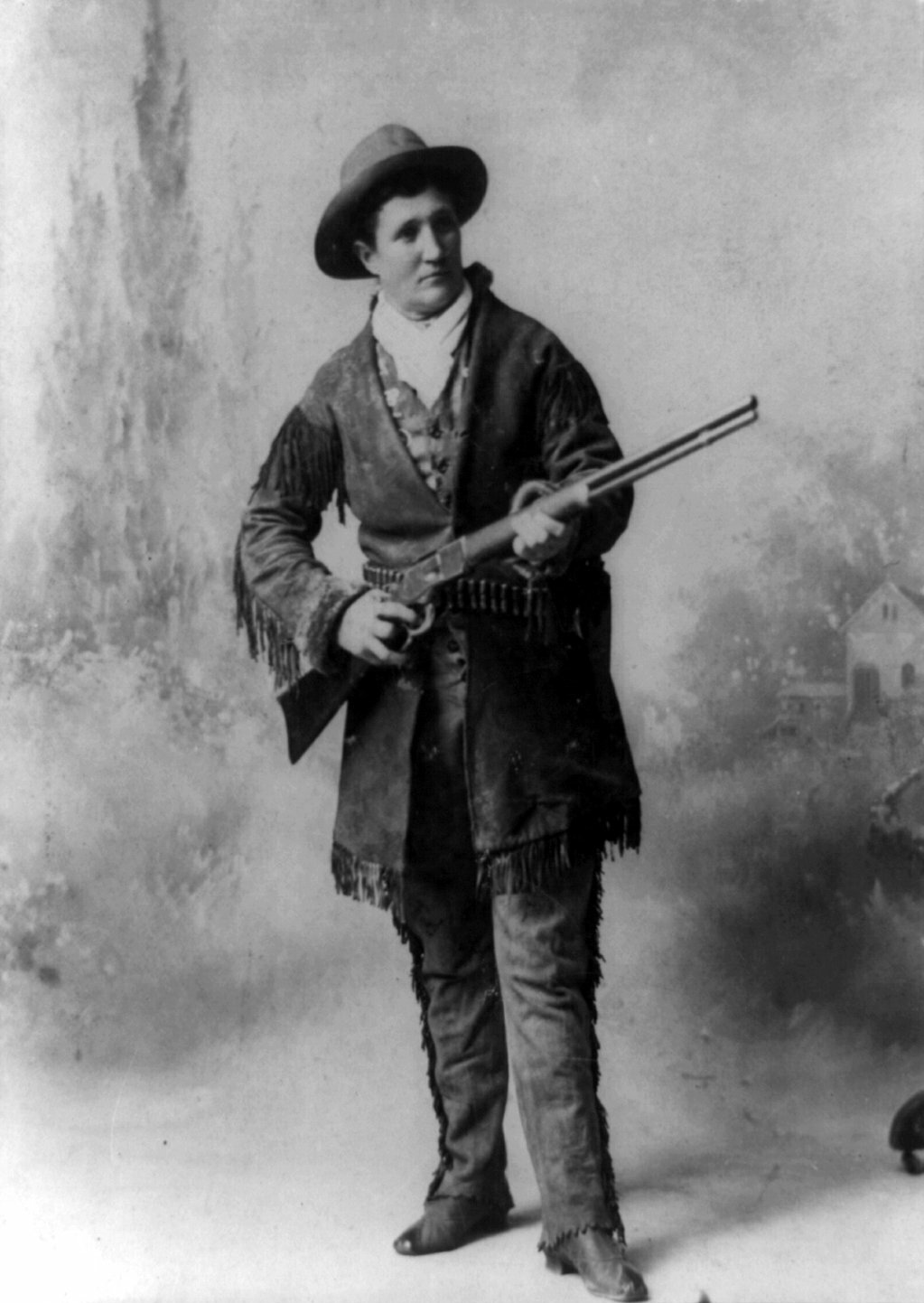
Calamity Jane, pioneer frontierswoman and scout, at age 43. Photo by H.R. Locke.

The American hunting and sporting passion comes from a time when the United States was an agrarian, subsistence nation where hunting was a profession for some, an auxiliary source of food for some settlers, and also a deterrence to animal predators. A connection between shooting skills and survival among rural American men was in many cases a necessity and a rite of passage for manhood. Hunting endures as a central sentimental component of a gun culture to control animal populations across the country, regardless of modern trends away from subsistence hunting and rural living.

The militia spirit derives from an early American dependence on arms to protect themselves from foreign armies and hostile Native Americans. Survival depended upon everyone being capable of using a weapon. Before the American Revolution there was neither budget nor manpower nor government desire to maintain a full-time army. Therefore, the armed citizen-soldier carried the responsibility. Enrollment in the militia was mandatory for most men, and the enlisted were responsible for providing their own weapons and ammunition. Yet, as early as the 1790s, the mandatory universal militia duty gave way to voluntary militia units and a reliance on a regular army. Throughout the 19th century, the institution of the civilian militia began to decline.

Closely related to the militia tradition was the frontier tradition with the need for a means of self-protection closely associated with the nineteenth-century westward expansion and the American frontier. In popular literature, frontier adventure was most famously told by James Fenimore Cooper, who is credited by Petri Liukkonen with creating the archetype of an 18th-century frontiersman through such novels as The Last of the Mohicans (1826) and The Deerslayer (1840).

Scotch-Irish Americans emigrated from areas of Ireland and Scotland that had historically been economically repressed and subject to violence. These immigrants brought with them an intense pride, individualism and love of guns which would shape future descendants' views and help form the origin of American gun culture. Settling in Appalachia, the Scots-Irish would lead the push westward and eventually populate a band stretching from Appalachia to Texas and Oklahoma, and particularly after the Dust Bowl into Southern California.

=== African American gun culture ===
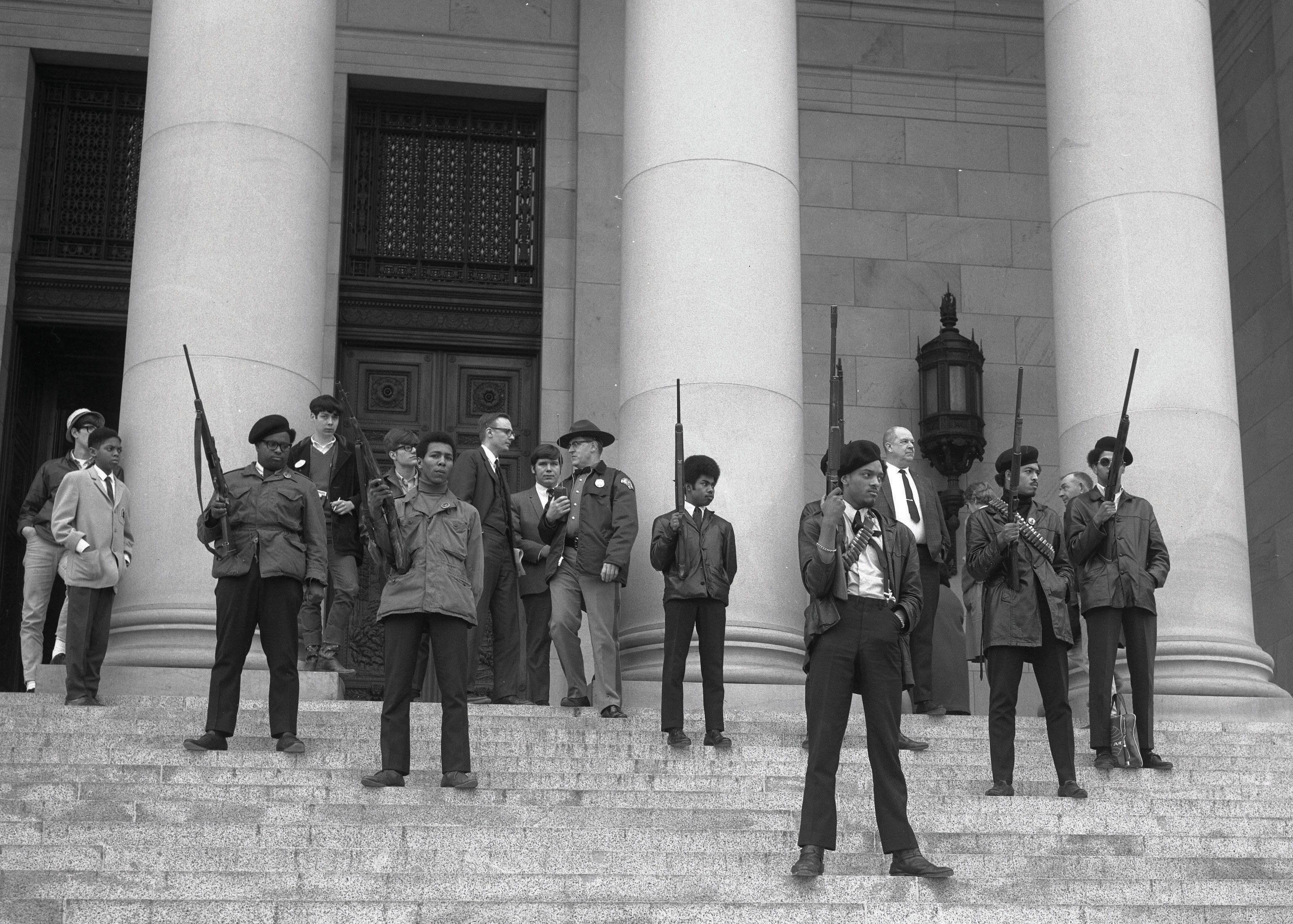
Black Panther Party armed demonstration at the Washington State Capitol on February 28, 1969

A distinct and growing sub-culture of American gun culture has been developed and promoted by African Americans since at least the end of the American Civil War. From Frederick Douglass, Du Bois, Ida B. Wells and Marcus Garvey, the American Civil Rights movement, and the Pan-African movement, an array of African American gun cultures and philosophies of violence and self-defense have proliferated in American life.

== Ownership levels ==
Annual gun production in the U.S. has increased substantially in the 21st century, after having remained fairly level over preceding decades. By 2023, a majority of U.S. states allowed adults to carry concealed guns in public.

U.S. gun sales have risen in the 21st century, peaking during the COVID-19 pandemic. "NICS" is the FBI's National Instant Background Check System.

Almost every major gunmaker produces its own version of the AR-15, with ~16 million Americans owning at least one.

Gun death rates correlate strongly (ρ = +0.76) with gun ownership rates.

According to statistics in the 2017 Small Arms Survey, "Americans made up 4 percent of the world's population but owned about 46 percent of the entire global stock of 857 million civilian firearms." U.S. civilians own 393 million guns. When compared to other countries in the Small Arms Survey, American civilians own more guns "than those held by civilians in the other top 25 countries combined."

In 2018 it was estimated that U.S. civilians own 393 million firearms, and that 40% to 42% of the households in the country have at least one gun. However, record gun sales followed in the following years. The U.S. has by far the highest estimated number of guns per capita in the world, at 120.5 guns for every 100 people.

As per 2023 survey, 32% of Americans own at least one firearm. From 1994 to 2023, gun ownership in America increased 28%. In which women's ownership increased by 13.6%, and Hispanic ownership increased by 33.3%.

Although historically there have been significant differences in respect to gun ownership between different races and sexes, that gap may be closing. For example, women and ethnic minorities saw the sharpest rise of private gun ownership in the United States in 2020 and the ongoing ownership trends do not indicate any sign of abatement. Also, in 2020 and 2021 a sharp increase in gun ownership was seen due to the riots and pandemic. Nearly half of the gun buyers appeared to be first-time owners. Over 2 million firearms were purchased during the pandemic alone.

According to Gallup, in 2020, 32% of U.S. adults said they personally own a gun, while a larger percentage, 44%, report living in a gun household.

== Popular culture ==
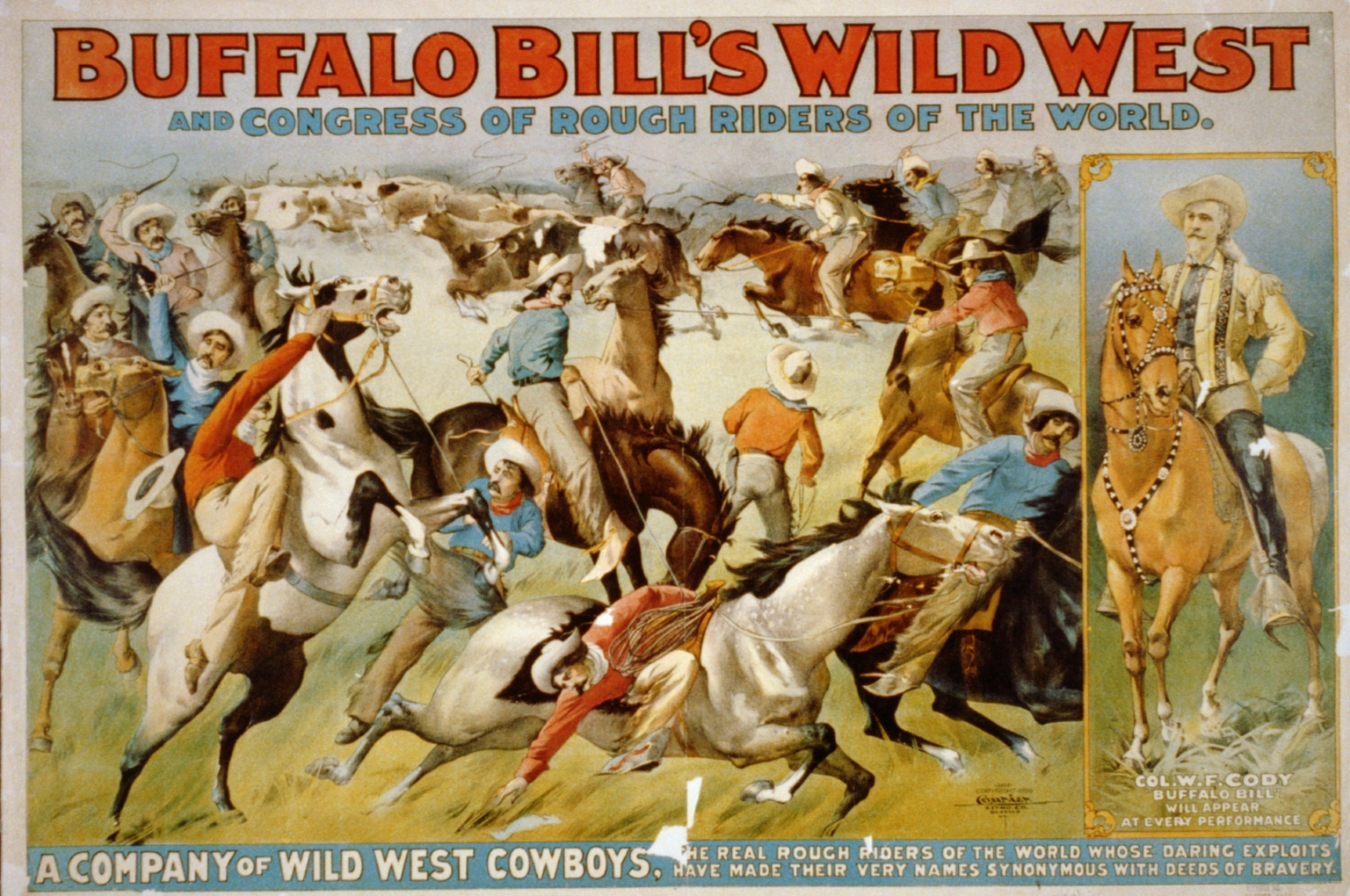
A handbill for Buffalo Bill's Wild West and Congress of Rough Riders of the World

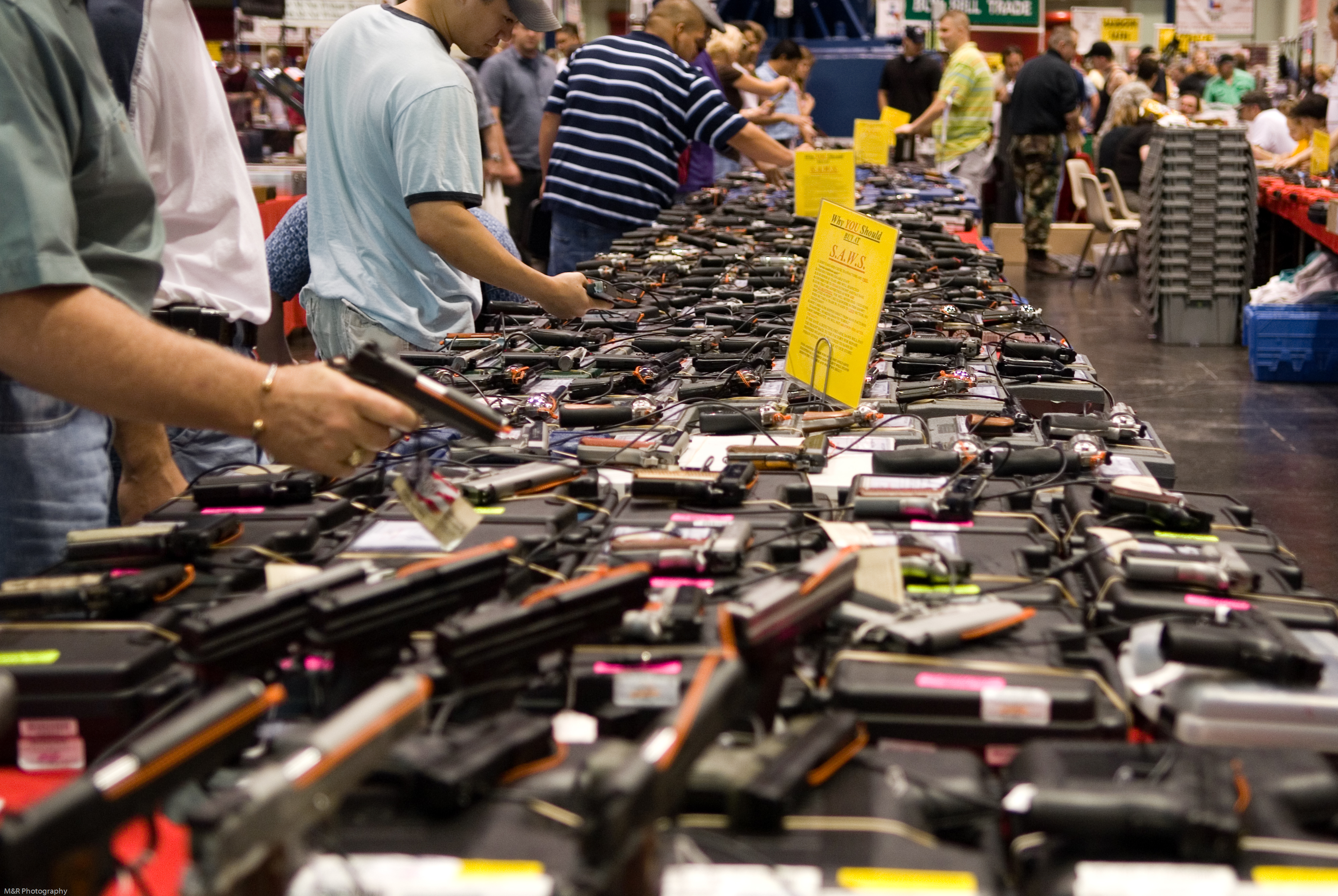
Visitors at a gun show, U.S.

In the late 19th century, cowboy and "Wild West" imagery entered the collective imagination. The first American female superstar, Annie Oakley, was a sharpshooter who toured the country starting in 1885, performing in Buffalo Bill's Wild West show. The cowboy archetype of the individualist hero was established largely by Owen Wister in stories and novels, most notably The Virginian (1902), following close on the heels of Theodore Roosevelt's The Winning of the West (1889–1895), a history of the early frontier. Cowboys were also popularized in turn of the 20th century cinema, notably through such early classics as The Great Train Robbery (1903) and A California Hold Up (1906)—the most commercially successful film of the pre-nickelodeon era.

Gangster films started in 1910, but became popular only with the advent of sound in film in the 1930s. The genre was boosted by the events of the prohibition era, such as bootlegging and the St. Valentine's Day Massacre of 1929, the existence of real-life gangsters such as Al Capone and the rise of contemporary organized crime and escalation of urban violence. These movies flaunted the archetypal exploits of "swaggering, cruel, wily, tough, and law-defying bootleggers and urban gangsters".

Since World War II, Hollywood has produced many morale-boosting movies, patriotic rallying cries that affirmed a sense of national purpose. The image of the lone cowboy was replaced in these combat films by stories emphasizing group efforts and the value of individual sacrifices for a larger cause, often featuring a group of men from diverse ethnic backgrounds who were thrown together, tested on the battlefield, and molded into a dedicated fighting unit.

Guns frequently accompanied famous heroes and villains in late 20th-century American films, from the outlaws of Bonnie and Clyde (1967) and The Godfather (1972), to fictional law and order avengers such as Dirty Harry (1971) and RoboCop (1987). In the 1970s, fictional madmen ostensibly produced by the Vietnam War were central to films such as Taxi Driver (1976) and Apocalypse Now (1979), while the 1978 films Coming Home and The Deer Hunter told stories of fictional veterans who were victims of the war and in need of rehabilitation. Many action films continue to celebrate the gun-toting hero in fictional settings. The negative role of the gun in fictionalized modern urban violence has been explored in films such as Boyz n the Hood (1991) and Menace 2 Society (1993). Bowling for Columbine was a 2002 documentary by Michael Moore exploring gun culture in the United States.

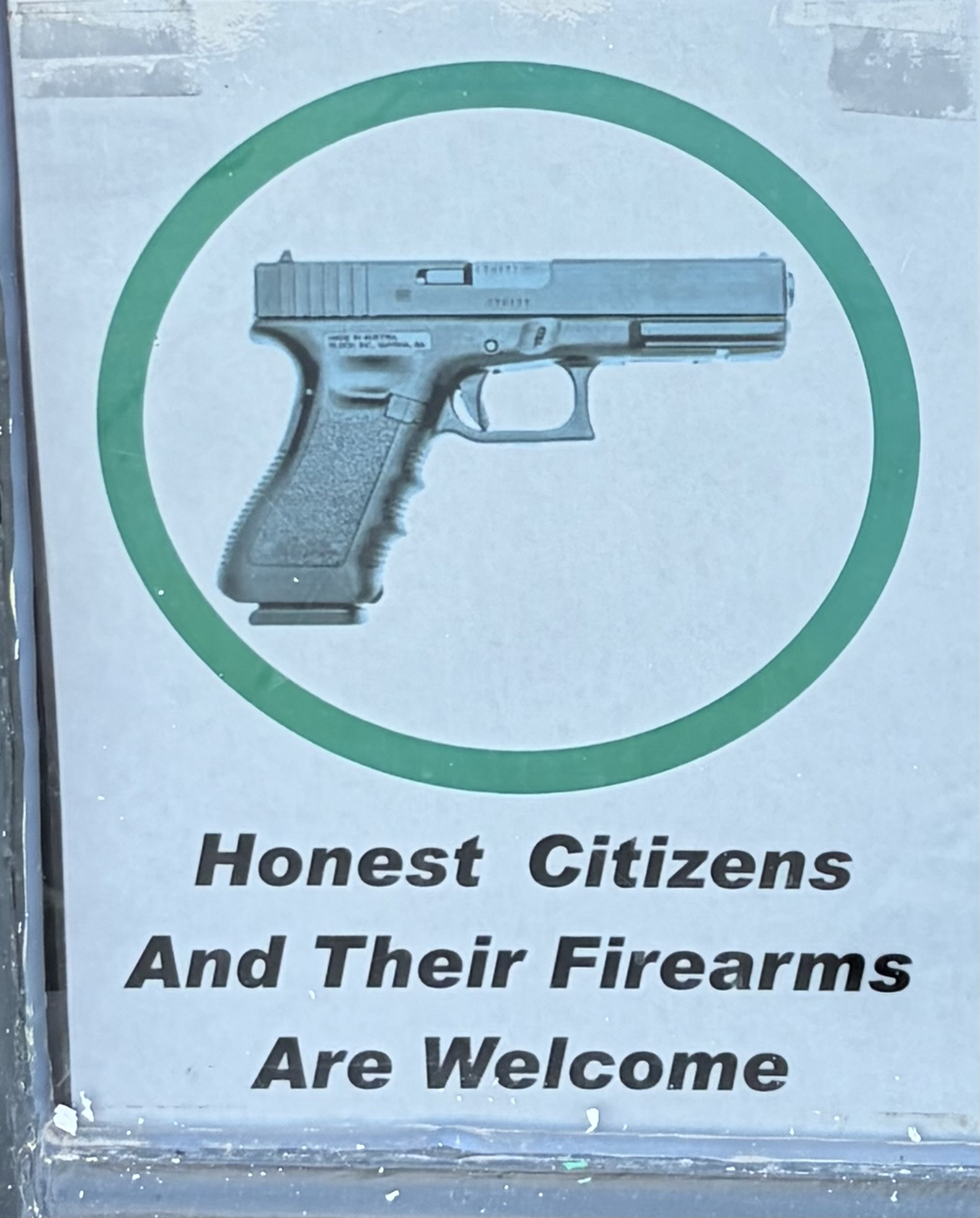
Firearms welcome sign in a shop window

== Political and cultural theories ==
U.S. opinion on gun control issues is deeply divided along political lines, as shown in this 2021 survey.

Gun culture and its effects have been at the center of major debates in the U.S. public sphere for decades. In his 1970 article "America as a Gun Culture," historian Richard Hofstadter used the phrase "gun culture" to characterize America as having a long-held affection for guns, embracing and celebrating the association of guns and an overall heritage relating to guns. He also noted that the US "is the only industrial nation in which the possession of rifles, shotguns, and handguns is lawfully prevalent among large numbers of its population". In 1995, political scientist Robert Spitzer said that the modern American gun culture is founded on three factors: the proliferation of firearms since the earliest days of the nation, the connection between personal ownership of weapons and the country's revolutionary and frontier history, and the cultural mythology regarding the gun in the frontier and in modern life. In 2008, the US Supreme Court affirmed that the right of individuals to possess firearms is guaranteed by the Second Amendment.

== Terms applied to opponents ==
Terms used by gun rights and gun control advocates to refer to opponents are part of the larger topic of gun politics.

The term gun nut refers to firearms enthusiasts who are deeply involved with the gun culture. It is regarded as a pejorative stereotype cast upon gun owners by gun control advocates as a means of implying that they are fanatical, exhibit abnormal behavior, or are a threat to the safety of others. Some gun owners embrace the term affectionately.

The term hoplophobia refers to an "irrational aversion to firearms", and US Marine Jeff Cooper claimed to have invented the term in the 1960s.

== Foreign perspective ==
The U.S. relationship with guns often perplexes those in other developed countries, many of whom do not understand the unusual permissiveness of American gun laws, and believe that the American public should push for harsher gun control measures due to mass shootings. Critics contrast the US reaction to terrorism given how few deaths it causes, with their high death rates from non-terror related gun crime.

== See also ==
- Gun control
- Gun ownership
- Gun politics
- Gun show loophole
- Gun violence in the United States
- Index of gun politics articles
- Second Amendment sanctuary
