= 2024 Interstate 75 Kentucky shooting =

Mass shooting in Kentucky, U.S.

- Location: 37°13′35.3″N 84°12′55.0″W; Interstate 75; Laurel County, Kentucky, US
- Date: September 7, 2024; 2 years ago c. 5:30 p.m. (EDT)
- Target: People in cars
- Attack type: Mass shooting
- Weapon: Cobalt Kinetics AR-15-style semi-automatic rifle
- Deaths: 1 (the perpetrator)
- Injuries: 8 (5 by gunfire)
- Perpetrator: Joseph Allen Couch
- Motive: Undetermined

On September 7, 2024, eight people were wounded during a mass shooting on Kentucky's Interstate 75. A gunman, subsequently identified as Joseph A. Couch, fired at least 20 rounds at passing cars from the overpass at Exit 49. He escaped from the scene and was the subject of a manhunt. Couch's body was found 11 days later, having died from a self-inflicted gunshot.

== Shooting ==
At around 5:30 p.m., a lone gunman fired 20–30 rounds at people in passing vehicles from a ledge on the side of a cliff overlooking Interstate 75, striking seventeen vehicles and seriously injuring five people. Victims were transported to Saint Joseph London Hospital and the UK HealthCare by ambulances and other law enforcement vehicles due to the severity of their injuries. All victims survived.

== Victims ==
Eight people were injured, five by gunshot and three by vehicle collisions caused by the gunfire. All of the victims were in stable condition.

== Perpetrator ==
The perpetrator was identified as Joseph Allen Couch (August 6, 1992 – September 7, 2024), a 32-year-old male resident of Woodbine, Kentucky. He previously served in the Army Reserve from March 2013 to January 2019 as a combat engineer (MOS 12B) with the rank of private. Before the shooting, Couch had legally purchased a firearm along with 1,000 rounds of ammunition from the gun store Center Target Firearms and then texted his ex-wife that he was going to "kill a lot of people" and then kill himself. Couch had previously been arrested and charged on February 5, 2024, for making third-degree terroristic threats after threatening to kill his neighbor and his neighbor's dog with an AR-15. Couch's body was found on September 18, having died from a self-inflicted gunshot.

== Aftermath ==
Eight people were injured, including three people due to vehicle crashes caused by the shooting; seventeen cars were shot and damaged. The highway was closed for three hours until around 9:30 p.m., an SOS alert was sent out, a state of emergency was declared and a manhunt ensued in search of the gunman, which resumed on September 8 at around 9 a.m. A suspected shooting on September 11 near Hal Rogers Parkway in Hazard prompted the Perry County school district to put schools on lockdown and cancel classes the next day. The preliminary investigation by the Hazard Police Department indicated that there was no shooting and there was no danger to the public.

On September 12, Governor Andy Beshear expressed his appreciation for the recovery of four of the five victims and acknowledged the efforts of first responders.

On September 13, Exit 49 was reopened after having been blocked off since the attack.

On September 24, Couch was laid to rest at the Resthaven Cemetery in Corbin.

== Manhunt ==
The manhunt for the suspect resumed on September 8, 2024, involving drones, police dogs, helicopters and dozens of police officers in the Daniel Boone National Forest. The police stated the shooting was a random attack, and was not road rage-related. The Laurel County Sheriff's Office said they located the suspect's silver Honda CR-V, a semi-automatic Cobalt Kinetics AR-15 mounted with a Holosun red dot sight, a gun case, several additional magazines, a phone, spent shell casings and a green Army-style duffel bag with "Couch" written on it in black marker, in a wooded area next to the interstate. Schools in the area were closed on September 9 through September 11 as the manhunt continued. A $35,000 reward was offered for information leading to the arrest of the perpetrator.

On September 18, two people found a decomposed body in a forested area near the Interstate exit. The body, believed to be Couch, was found after the couple noticed vultures circling the area. An initial DNA test was inconclusive, but an autopsy revealed the cause of death to be a self-inflicted gunshot wound to the head. Couch's body was identified on September 20.

== See also ==
- 1965 Highway 101 sniper attack
- Midland–Odessa shootings
- D.C. sniper attacks
- Ohio highway sniper attacks
- Phoenix freeway shootings
- 1969 Pennsylvania Turnpike shootings
