= Gun show loophole =

US political term for sale of firearms by private sellers

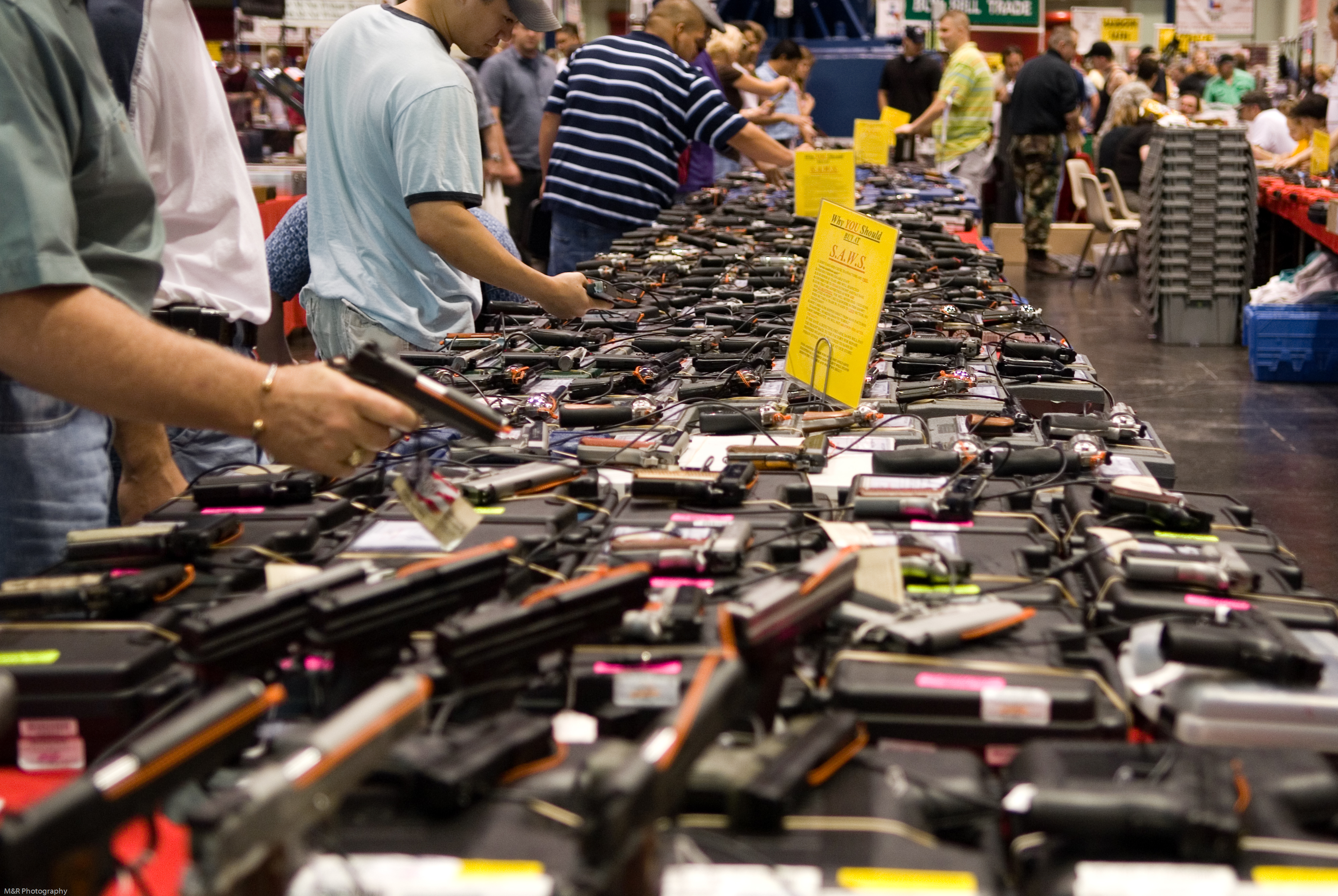
Handguns for sale at a gun show

In U.S. politics, the gun show loophole (or the private sale exemption) is the absence of a federal requirement for background checks for private sales of firearms. Federal law requires that all commercial sales of firearms conduct a background check of the buyer. There are also local and state laws regulating background check requirements for the purchase of firearms. The rules regarding commercial sales and who is "engaged in the business" of firearms sales have also been subject to debate and have changed since 1993 when the Brady Handgun Violence Prevention Act, commonly known as the Brady Bill, established the background check system for transfers other than private, instate transfers.

According to a statement by the United States Department of Justice in 2024, unlicensed dealers are a significant source of firearms that are illegally trafficked into communities. Twenty-two U.S. states, the District of Columbia, and all U.S. territories have laws that require background checks for some or all private sales, including sales at gun shows. In most of these states, such non-commercial sales also must be facilitated through a federally licensed dealer, who performs the background check and records the sale. In other states, gun buyers must first obtain a license or permit from the state, which performs a background check before issuing the license (thus typically not requiring a duplicative background check from a gun dealer).

== History ==
The Federal Firearms Act of 1938 (FFA) established the requirement that gun manufacturers, importers, and those in the business of selling firearms have a federal firearms license (FFL), and prohibited the transfer of firearms to certain classes of people, such as convicted felons. For firearm sales or transfers by private individuals, federal law does not require background checks.

In 1968, Congress passed the Gun Control Act (GCA), under which modern firearm commerce operates. The GCA mandated FFLs for those "engaged in the business" of selling firearms, but not for private individuals who sold firearms infrequently. Under the Gun Control Act, firearm dealers were prohibited from doing business anywhere except the address listed on their federal firearms license. It also mandated that licensed firearm dealers maintain records of firearms sales. An unlicensed citizen was prohibited by federal law from transferring, selling, trading, giving, transporting, or delivering a firearm to any other unlicensed person if they knew or had reasonable cause to believe the buyer did not reside in the same state or was prohibited by law from purchasing or possessing firearms.

In 1986, Congress passed the Firearm Owners Protection Act (FOPA), which relaxed certain controls in the Gun Control Act and permitted licensed firearm dealers to conduct business at gun shows. (Note: According to the Council on Foreign Relations and a news report posted on the National Center for Policy Analysis' website, gun control advocates maintain that the gun show loophole appeared and was codified in FOPA.) Specifically, FOPA made it legal for FFL holders to make private sales, provided the firearm was transferred to the licensee's personal collection at least one year prior to the sale. Hence, when a personal firearm is sold by an FFL holder, no background check or Form 4473 is required by federal law. FFL holders are required to keep a record of such sales in a bound book. The United States Department of Justice (USDOJ) said the stated purpose of FOPA was to ensure the GCA did not "place any undue or unnecessary federal restrictions or burdens on law-abiding citizens, but it opened many loopholes through which illegal gun traffickers can slip". The scope of those who "engage in the business" of dealing in firearms (and are therefore required to have a license) was narrowed to include only those who devote "time, attention, and labor to dealing in firearms as a regular course of trade or business with the principal objective of livelihood and profit through the repetitive purchase and resale of firearms".

FOPA excluded those who buy and sell firearms to "enhance a personal collection" or for a "hobby", or who "sell all or part of a personal collection". According to the USDOJ, this new definition made it difficult for them to identify offenders who could claim they were operating as "hobbyists" trading firearms from their personal collection. (Note: The National Rifle Association of America (NRA) says that the purpose of FOPA was to reduce burdens on gun dealers and record-keeping on gun owners. Chris W. Cox, chief lobbyist for the NRA Institute for Legislative Action, said: "To be sure, it's not a 'loophole', because FOPA made clear no license is required to make occasional sales, exchanges or purchases of firearms for the enhancement of a personal collection or for a hobby. What some refer to as a 'loophole' is actually federal law.") Efforts to reverse a key feature of FOPA by requiring criminal background checks and purchase records on private sales at gun shows were unsuccessful.

In 1993, Congress enacted the Brady Handgun Violence Prevention Act, amending the Gun Control Act of 1968. "The Brady Law", which went into effect in 1994, instituted federal background checks on all firearm purchasers who buy from a dealer who has a federal firearms license (FFL). The Brady Law originally imposed an interim measure, requiring a waiting period of 5 days before a licensed importer, manufacturer, or dealer may sell, deliver, or transfer a handgun to an unlicensed individual. The waiting period applied only in states without an alternate system that was deemed acceptable of conducting background checks on handgun purchasers. Personal transfers and sales between unlicensed Americans could also still be subject to other federal, state, and local restrictions. These interim provisions ceased to apply on November 30, 1998.

=== Provenance ===
After the Brady amendment passed, the gun show loophole was also referred to as the Brady bill loophole, the Brady law loophole, the gun law loophole, or the private sale loophole. The "loophole" characterization refers to a perceived gap in laws that address what types of sales and transfers of firearms require records or background checks. Private parties who are not engaged in the business of selling firearms are not legally required by federal law to: ask for identification, complete any forms, or keep any sales records, as long as the sale is not made in interstate commerce (across state lines) and does not fall under purview of the National Firearms Act (originally of 1934 and revised in 1968, which governs machine guns, short-barreled rifles, sawed-off shotguns, suppressors and destructive devices).

In 1999 the Bureau of Alcohol, Tobacco and Firearms (ATF) reported that the definition of who is "engaged in the business" of firearms sales is overly narrow and that the Brady law did not help private sellers identify prohibited persons seeking to purchase firearms, while also allowing habitual arms traders to claim that they fall within the private sales exemption.

== Jurisdictions requiring background checks for private sales ==
A number of states have background check requirements beyond federal law. Some states require universal background checks at the point of sale for all transfers, including purchases from unlicensed sellers. Pennsylvania and Nebraska laws in this regard are limited to handguns, and the Minnesota background check requirement is limited to handguns and assault weapons. Iowa (starting in 2011) and North Carolina (starting 2014) had state permit requirements for handgun purchases that included background checks, but Iowa repealed this requirement in 2021 and North Carolina did the same in 2023. Indiana and Tennessee also had handgun background check requirements that were repealed around 1981 and 1994, respectively. Hawaii, Massachusetts, Michigan and New Jersey require any firearm purchaser to obtain a permit. Illinois began requiring background checks for sales at gun shows in 2005 and began requiring checks for all private sales in 2014; in 2023 the state changed its law to require private sales to go through background checks processed by FFL holders. Vermont passed new gun control laws in 2018, one of which requires background checks for private sales. Nevada's revised law went into effect in 2020. Virginia also started requiring background checks in 2020. A majority of these jurisdictions require unlicensed sellers to keep records of firearm sales.

All populated territories of the United States require purchasers to have a territory-issued license to purchase or take possession of a firearm, and the only firearms permitted in American Samoa are shotguns and .22 caliber rifles.

Some cities and counties have also established local laws affecting gun ownership. For example Tacoma, Washington, has a background check requirement for purchases made at gun shows on city-owned property (made redundant by a state law passed the same year requiring universal background checks), and New York City has its own gun licensing requirements (in addition to being in a state that requires universal background checks).

Some states and counties have adopted "Second Amendment sanctuary" resolutions or laws in opposition to universal background check laws.

The following table summarizes the state, territory, and District of Columbia laws requiring background checks.

Background checks for private sales (date effective)
	Background check by FFL required	State/territory-issued permit required
All firearms	California (1991); Colorado (2013); Connecticut (2013); Delaware (2013); Illinois (at gun shows in 2005, all sales 2014, checks by FFL holder 2023); Maine (for sales at gun shows and sales that are advertised, 2024); Maryland (non-handguns included 2021); Nevada (2020); New Mexico (transfers made without payment exempt, 2019); New York (2013); Oregon (2015); Rhode Island (1990); Vermont (2018); Virginia (transfers made without payment exempt, 2020); Washington (2014) District of Columbia (1976)	Hawaii (2013); Massachusetts (2006); Michigan (2024); New Jersey (2011) American Samoa (only shotguns and .22 caliber rifles permitted); Guam; Northern Mariana Islands; Puerto Rico (sometime before 2000); U.S. Virgin Islands
Handguns	Minnesota (also for assault weapons, 2023); Pennsylvania (2010)	Nebraska (2010) (handguns prohibited in American Samoa)

== Government studies and positions ==
A 1997 report by the National Institute of Justice based on self-reported survey responses by convicted criminals found that fewer than 2% of convicted criminals said they bought their firearm at a flea market or gun show. About 12% said they purchased it from a retail store or pawnshop, and 80% said they bought it from family, friends, or an illegal source. A 2019 study by the Bureau of Justice Statistics found that fewer than 1% of prison inmates who responded to a survey said they obtained a firearm at a gun show (0.8%).

According to a 1999 report by the ATF, legal private party transactions contribute to illegal activities, such as arms trafficking, purchases of firearms by prohibited buyers, and straw purchases. Anyone selling a firearm is legally prohibited from selling it to anyone the seller knows or has reasonable cause to believe is prohibited from owning a firearm. FFL holders, in general, can only transfer firearms to a non-licensed individual if that individual resides in the state where the FFL holder is licensed to do business, and only at that place of business or a gun show in their state.

Under Chapter 18 Section 922 of the United States Code it is unlawful for any person "except a licensed importer, licensed manufacturer, or licensed dealer, to engage in the business of importing, manufacturing, or dealing in firearms".

Under Chapter 18 Section 921(a)(11) a dealer is:

(A) any person engaged in the business of selling firearms at wholesale or retail, (B) any person engaged in the business of repairing firearms or of making or fitting special barrels, stocks, or trigger mechanisms to firearms, or (C) any person who is a pawnbroker.

The 1999 report said that more than 4,000 gun shows are held in the U.S. annually. Between 50 and 75 percent of gun show vendors also hold a federal firearms license, and the "majority of vendors who attend shows sell firearms, associated accessories, and other paraphernalia". The report concluded that while most sellers at gun shows are upstanding people, a few corrupt sellers could move a large quantity of firearms into high-risk hands through gaps in current law, and recommended "extending the Brady Law to 'close the gun show loophole'".

In 2009 the U.S. Government Accountability Office published a report citing that many firearms trafficked to Mexico may be purchased through these types of private transactions, by individuals who may want to avoid background checks and records of their firearms purchases. (Note: A report released in 2009 discussed the role that gun shows play in trafficking to Mexico.) Firearm tracing starts at the manufacturer or importer and typically ends at the first private sale regardless if the private seller later sells to an FFL or uses an FFL for background checks.

After the passage of the BSCA in 2022, the Dept. of Justice held a hearing in 2024 on the definition of "engaged in the business" in relation to the sale of firearms, during which the DOJ characterized the term "gun show loophole" as a misnomer and that there is no statutory exemption under the GCA for unlicensed persons to engage in the business of dealing in firearms at a gun show, or at any other venue. According to a DOJ and BATFE notice on proposed definition changes by the BSCA, "there is no minimum number of transactions that determines whether a person is 'engaged in the business' of dealing in firearms. Instead, the established approach is to look at the totality of circumstances. Thus, even a single firearm transaction, or offer to engage in a transaction, when combined with other evidence, may be sufficient to require a license." Under the second Trump administration in May 2026, the Bureau of Alcohol, Tobacco, Firearms, and Explosives proposed new revisions to the 'engaged in the business' definition from the Bipartisan Safer Communities Act.

=== Executive branch ===
On November 6, 1998, U.S. President Bill Clinton issued a memorandum for the Secretary of the Treasury and the Attorney General expressing concern about sellers at gun shows not being required to run background checks on potential buyers. He called this absence a "loophole" and said that it made gun shows prime targets for criminals and gun traffickers. He requested recommendations on what actions the administration should take, including legislation. In the year following the 1999 Columbine High School massacre Clinton continued to advocate for legislation to increase background checks.

During his campaign and presidency, President George W. Bush endorsed the idea of background checks at gun shows. Bush's position was that the gun show loophole should be closed by federal legislation since the gun show loophole was created by previous federal legislation. President Bush ordered an investigation by the U.S. Departments of Health, Education, and Justice in the wake of the Virginia Tech shooting in order to make recommendations on ways the federal government can prevent such tragedies. On January 8, 2008, he signed the NICS Improvement Amendments Act of 2007 (NIAA) into law. Goals and objectives that the NIAA sought to address included:

The gap in information available to NICS about such prohibiting mental health adjudications and commitments. Filling these information gaps will better enable the system to operate as intended, to keep guns out of the hands of persons prohibited by federal or state law from receiving or possessing firearms.

A month after the Sandy Hook shooting in December 2012, President Barack Obama outlined proposals regarding new gun control legislation asking Congress to close the gun show loophole by requiring background checks for all firearm sales. Closing the gun show loophole became part of a larger push for universal background checks to close "federal loopholes on such checks at gun shows and other private sales".

After the 2019 Dayton shooting and 2019 El Paso shooting President Donald Trump expressed an interest in tighter background checks for gun purchases. After the shootings president Trump posted a response on social media:

We cannot let those killed in El Paso, Texas, and Dayton, Ohio, die in vain. Likewise for those so seriously wounded. We can never forget them, and those many who came before them. Republicans and Democrats must come together and get strong background checks, perhaps marrying this legislation with desperately needed immigration reform. We must have something good, if not GREAT, come out of these two tragic events!

After the Midland–Odessa shootings, in which the gunman had purchased a rifle through a private seller after a previous federal background check prevented him from purchasing a gun in 2014, Trump was quoted saying:

For the most part, sadly, if you look at the last four or five (shootings) going back even five or six or seven years [...] as strong as you make your background checks, they would not have stopped any of it.

In the wake of the March 2021 Boulder shooting President Joe Biden said at a press conference that the US Senate should pass legislation, namely H.R. 8 and H.R. 1446, to close loopholes in background checks required for purchasing firearms. A month after the Uvalde school shooting and 2022 Buffalo shooting in May, Biden signed the Bipartisan Safer Communities Act with bipartisan support. Biden also established the White House Office of Gun Violence Prevention, to be overseen by Vice President Kamala Harris. In 2023, Biden had signed an executive order meant to close what is also known as the "fire sale" loophole, a similar exemption for licensed dealers who are closing their businesses and selling their inventory without background checks. Commenting on the legislation, Vice President Kamala Harris stated that:

Every year, thousands of unlicensed gun dealers sell tens of thousands of guns without a background check, including to buyers who would have failed one – domestic abusers, violent felons, and even children. This single gap in our federal background check system has caused unimaginable pain and suffering. Today, as the head of the White House Office of Gun Violence Prevention, I am proud to announce that all gun dealers must conduct background checks no matter where or how they sell.

In 2024, Harris also noted the 25th anniversary of the Columbine High School shooting which she viewed as consequential to the gun-show loophole.

After winning reelection in 2024, Trump issued executive orders directing the Attorney General to conduct a review "to assess any ongoing infringements of the Second Amendment rights of our citizens." Among the changes announced was a repeal of Biden administration rules, including rescinding a 2024 regulation that sought to end the gun show loophole. The new executive orders issued by Trump also included effectively dismantling the White House Office for Gun Violence Prevention.

== Legislation ==
Federal "gun show loophole" bills were introduced in seven consecutive Congresses: two in 2001, two in 2004, one in 2005, one in 2007, two in 2009, two in 2011, and one in 2013. Specifically, seven gun show "loophole" bills were introduced in the U.S. House and four in the Senate between 2001 and 2013. None passed. In May 2015 United States Representative Carolyn Maloney introduced H.R.2380, also referred to as the Gun Show Loophole Closing Act of 2015. It was referred to the Subcommittee on Crime, Terrorism, Homeland Security, and Investigations. In March 2017, Representative Maloney also introduced H.R.1612, referred to as the Gun Show Loophole Closing Act of 2017. In January 2019 she sponsored H.R.820 – the Gun Show Loophole Closing Act of 2019. She again reintroduced it in 2021. and Rep. Mark Takano reintroduced it in 2023, after which it was referred to the House Committee on the Judiciary.

In 2022, the Bipartisan Safer Communities Act (BSCA) was passed, which after interpretation by the United States Department of Justice, partly closed the gun show loophole. The (BSCA)'s passage broke an almost thirty year stalemate on gun control legislation as the first major piece of federal gun law reform since the 1993 Brady bill. In August 2023, the U.S. Justice Department and the ATF proposed new federal rules to clarify regulations for firearms sellers at gun shows, flea markets and for online firearms transactions. The new rules require sellers to obtain specific approvals and run background checks for firearm sales.

In late 2023, the ATF addressed the guidelines included in the Bipartisan Safer Communities Act, noting that "Federal law does not establish a 'bright-line' rule for when a federal firearms license is required. As a result, there is no specific threshold number or frequency of sales, quantity of firearms, or amount of profit or time invested that triggers the licensure requirement. Instead, determining whether you are "engaged in the business" of dealing in firearms requires looking at the specific facts and circumstances of your activities. Courts have upheld convictions for dealing without a license when as few as two firearms were sold, or when only a single transaction took place, when other factors were also present."

The Department of Justice issued a final rule in April 2024 that established a clarified definition of when a person is "engaged in the business" of dealing in firearms, and is thus required to obtain a federal firearms license. The modified rule, which went into effect in May 2024, affected how guns are sold and expanded background check requirements in the United States. It replaced the concept that a seller "engaged in the business" of dealing in firearms is someone who has a "principal objective of livelihood" as their goal with the concept that such a seller is anyone whose objective is "to predominantly earn a profit". The Department of Justice estimated that the rule modification would reclassify about 23,000 current unlicensed gun sellers as being profit-oriented and thus required to apply for an FFL, and said that the rule change might reduce the number of people motivated to cross state lines to take advantage of differences in state laws regarding whether background checks are needed.

Within the first year of Trump's second administration in 2025, most of the funding and CVI grants that were originally initiated via the 2022 Bipartisan Safer Communities Act were cancelled. Trump's executive orders, signed in February 2025, required the Department of Justice to review the positions taken by the government in "any and all ongoing and potential litigation" that deal with gun rights. In April 2025 the ATF announced that it would end the zero tolerance policy set forth under the previous administration that had been relaxed in 2024 as part of an earlier court challenge. As of 2026, the DOJ has also begun pursuing lawsuits against states that passed heavier restrictions on firearms.

== Other studies and opinions ==
In 1996, the Violence Policy Center (VPC) released Gun Shows in America: Tupperware® Parties for Criminals, a study that identified problems associated with gun shows. The VPC study documented the effect of the 1986 Firearms Owners' Protection Act in regard to proliferation of gun shows, which resulted in "a readily available source of weapons and ammunition for a wide variety of criminals, as well as Timothy McVeigh and David Koresh". According to the VPC, the utility of gun shows to dangerous individuals stems primarily from the exemption enjoyed by private sellers from the sales criteria of the Brady law as well as the absence of a background check. The director of the program which is located at the UC Davis, Garen J. Wintemute, wrote, "There is no such loophole in federal law, in the limited sense that the law does not exempt private-party sales at gun shows from regulation that is required elsewhere." In the context of avoiding pitfalls in legislation to end the gun show loophole, Wintemute's position states:

The fundamental flaw in the gun show loophole proposal is its failure to address the great majority of private-party sales, which occur at other locations and increasingly over the Internet at sites where any non-prohibited person can list firearms for sale and buyers can search for private-party sellers.

On May 27, 1999, Wayne LaPierre, executive vice president of the National Rifle Association of America (NRA), testified before the House Judiciary Subcommittee on Crime, saying: "We think it is reasonable to provide mandatory, instant criminal background checks for every sale at every gun show. No loopholes anywhere for anyone." LaPierre has since said that he is opposed to universal background checks.

In 1999, Dave Kopel, attorney and gun rights advocate for the NRA, said: "gun shows are no 'loophole' in the federal laws", and that singling out gun shows was "the first step toward abolishing all privacy regarding firearms and implementing universal gun registration". In January 2000, Kopel said that no proposed federal law would have made any difference at Columbine since the adults who supplied the weapons were legal purchasers.

In 2009, Nicholas J. Johnson of the Fordham University School of Law, wrote:

Criticisms of the "gun show loophole" imply that federal regulations allow otherwise prohibited retail purchases ("primary market sales") of firearms at gun shows. This implication is false. The real criticism is leveled at secondary market sales by private citizens.

In a 2010 statement from the Brady Campaign to Prevent Gun Violence: "Because of the gun show loophole, in most states prohibited buyers can walk into any gun show and buy weapons from unlicensed sellers with no background check. Many of these gun sellers operate week-to-week with no established place of business, traveling from gun show to gun show."

In 2013, the NRA said that a universal background check system for gun buyers is both impracticable and unnecessary, but an effective instant check system that includes records of persons adjudicated mentally ill would prevent potentially dangerous people from getting their hands on firearms. The group argues that only 10 percent of firearms are purchased via private sellers. They also dispute the idea that the current law amounts to a gun-show loophole, pointing out that many of the people selling at gun shows are federally licensed dealers. The group has stated in the past that: gun control supporters' objectives are to reduce gun sales and register guns, and that there is no "loophole", but legal commerce under the status quo (like book fairs or car shows).

According to a 1994 survey called the National Survey on the Private Ownership of Firearms (NSPOF), it was estimated that 60% of firearms obtained by private parties were from retail dealers, with the remaining 40% being from other private parties. Based on 2015 data, Philip J. Cook, who was the lead researcher for the prior NSPOF survey, produced an updated estimate of 22% for the percentage of gun transfers processed as private sales.

In 2016, a study published in The Lancet reported that state laws only requiring background checks or permits for gun sales at gun shows were associated with higher rates of gun-related deaths. The same study also found that state laws that required background checks for all gun sales were strongly associated with lower rates of gun-related deaths. Also that year Gabriel J. Chin, professor at UC Davis School of Law, stated that since there are no clear stipulations for the number of firearms sold before someone is required to be federally licensed and that since gun shows are usually held on weekends, "there is room for someone to claim 'this is a hobby or part of my collection' when it is also a substantial business."

Establishing universal background checks enjoys high levels of public support, with about 85% of the public or more in favor of the requirement (including about 77% of gun owners). Universal background checks were also given the highest rating of effectiveness among 29 possible gun control measures for reducing firearm homicides in a survey of 32 academic experts on gun policy reported by The New York Times in January 2017.

A position paper submitted to the Annals of Internal Medicine from the American College of Physicians in 2018 stated, "The Gun show loophole should be closed to ensure that prohibited purchasers, such as felons, persons who have been involuntarily committed for mental illness or are otherwise 'adjudicated mentally defective', and others who are prohibited from owning firearms, cannot make purchases."

== Contributing events ==
After the Columbine High School massacre on April 20, 1999, gun shows and background checks became a focus of national debate in the United States. The Columbine shooters had obtained the guns via a straw purchase through private sellers at gun shows. Weeks after the shooting, United States Senators Frank Lautenberg and Jack Reed introduced a bill to require background checks for sales at gun shows in federal law. It was passed in the Senate, but did not pass in the House.

The Virginia Tech shooting on April 16, 2007, again brought discussion of the gun show loophole to the forefront of U.S. politics, even though the shooter passed a background check and purchased his weapons legally at a Virginia gun shop via a Wisconsin-based Internet dealer. Previously, in December 2005, a Virginia judge had directed the Virginia Tech gunman to undergo outpatient treatment, but because he was treated as an outpatient, Virginia did not send his name to the National Instant Criminal Background Check System (NICS). On April 30, 2007, Tim Kaine, the Governor of Virginia, issued an executive order intended to prohibit the sale of guns to anyone found to be dangerous and forced to undergo involuntary mental health treatment. He called on lawmakers to close the gun show loophole. A bill to close the gun show loophole in Virginia was submitted, but eventually failed. Since then, Virginia lawmakers' efforts to close the gun show loophole were continuously blocked by gun rights advocates. The governor wrote:

I was disappointed to see the Virginia legislature balk, largely under pressure from the NRA, at efforts to close the gun-show loophole that allows anyone to buy weapons without any background check. That loophole still exists.

Debate and reports about the gun show loophole resumed after the July 2012 Aurora, Colorado, shooting, the October 2012 Azana Spa shooting in Wisconsin, in which the handgun used was purchased legally in a private transaction, not at a gun show, and the December 2012 Sandy Hook Elementary School shooting involving weapons legally purchased and owned by the shooter's mother. After Sandy Hook, senators proposed an amendment to federal legislation requesting universal background checks to close the gun show "loophole". David Keene, then-president of the NRA, said after the Aurora shooting that such tragedies are often exploited by the media and politicians. He said, "Colorado has already closed the so-called 'loophole' and the killer didn't buy his guns at a gun show."

After the Charleston church shooting in 2015 raised the topic of background checks, former president Obama took executive actions in effort to close the gun show loophole. In accordance with The Brady Act and certain state's laws, licensed gun dealers may complete firearm sales with an incomplete background check after three days. The result of the background check in this case is technically referred to as a "default proceed", which does not involve a private sale. The perpetrator was prohibited from purchasing a firearm but was able to complete the purchase of a gun used in the attack through a licensed seller when his background check remained incomplete after the required three day waiting period. After the Charleston attack, the three day default proceed provision also came to be known as a Charleston loophole. In a statement during the aftermath of the shooting, former FBI Director James Comey told reporters the shooter should have been denied, but the data was added incorrectly into the (NICS) database.

According to a 2022 analysis by the New York Times, it was estimated that among the perpetrators of mass shootings, four bought from private sellers, including the gunman of the 2019 Midland–Odessa shootings, in which the gunman had purchased a rifle through a private seller after a previous federal background check prevented him from purchasing a gun in 2014. NBC reported that sources close to the negotiations of The Bipartisan Safer Communities Act remained uncertain that it could close the gun show loophole, also that they had the 2019 Midland-Odessa shooter in mind during the proceedings. The law was passed in 2022 with bipartisan support after mass shootings occurred in Uvalde, Texas and Buffalo, New York the same year.

== See also ==
- Boyfriend loophole, a lack of regulation of firearms purchases by stalkers and non-cohabitant, non-spouse romantic partners
- Homemade firearm, also known as "ghost guns", firearms manufactured by unlicensed private parties
- Gun Show Loophole Closing Act of 2009, a proposed law containing provisions specific to sales at gun shows
