= Buckskin Mountain =

Mountain in Humboldt County, Nevada, United States

Coordinates: 41°47′22″N 117°33′11″W

Buckskin Mountain is a summit in the U.S. state of Nevada. The elevation is 8,724 feet (2,659 m).

Buckskin Mountain was named for the fact the summit has the color of buckskin. A variant name was "Buckskin Peak".
