= Guns in the United States =

Several articles cover topics related to guns in the United States:

- Gun culture in the United States
- Gun law in the United States
- Gun politics in the United States
- Gun violence in the United States
