= Buckskins =

Clothing made of deer hide

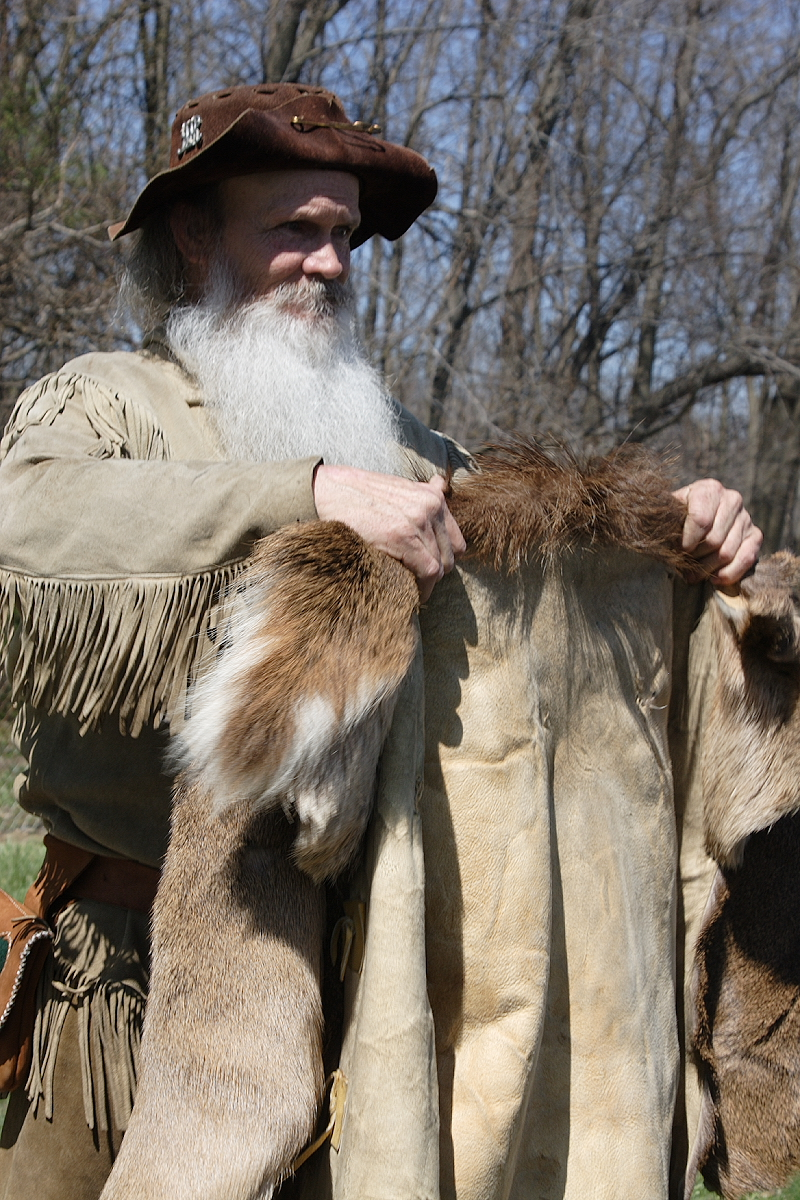
Mountain man reenactor dressed in buckskins

Buckskins are clothing, usually consisting of a jacket and leggings, made from buckskin, a soft sueded leather from the hide of deer. Buckskins are often trimmed with a fringe – originally a functional detail, to allow the garment to shed rain, and to dry faster when wet because the fringe acted as a series of wicks to disperse the water – or quills. They also served as a form of camouflage when hunting, by breaking up the outline of the wearer and allowing them to blend in with their background.

Buckskins derive from deerskin clothing worn by Native Americans. They were popular with mountain men and other frontiersmen for their warmth and durability. Buckskin jackets, often dyed and elaborately detailed, are a staple of western wear and were a brief fad in the 1970s. The American jacket/tunic known as a wamus was originally made from buckskin with fringe.

== Famous wearers ==
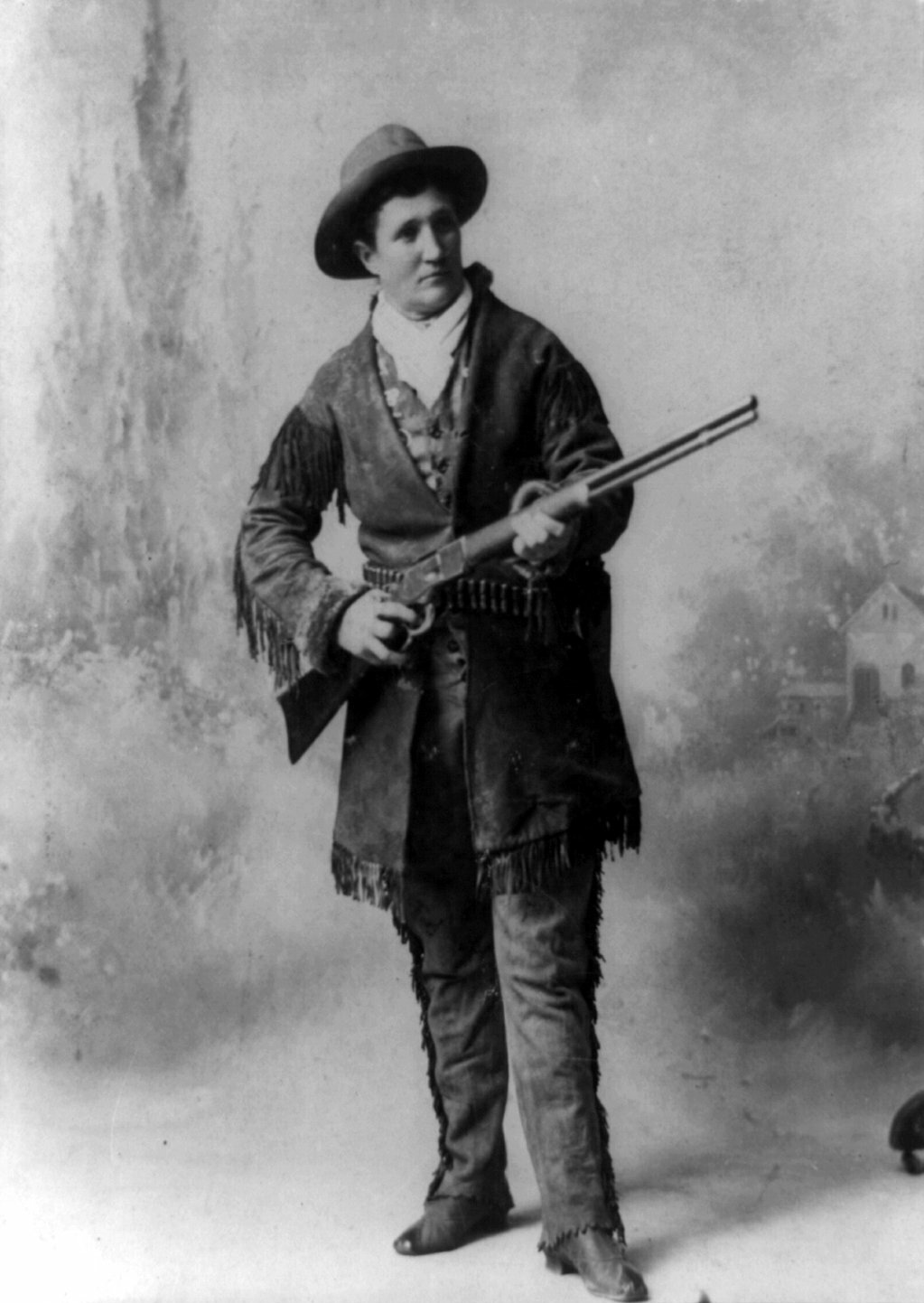
Calamity Jane dressed in buckskins. Photo by H. R. Locke.

- Buffalo Bill
- Daniel Boone
- Sitting Bull
- Kit Carson
- Davy Crockett
- George Armstrong Custer
- Wild Bill Hickok
- Calamity Jane
- Seth Kinman
- Charles Manson
- Metis people
- Annie Oakley
- Texas Jack Omohundro
- Theodore Roosevelt
- Tommy Seebach
- Voyageurs
