= 1967 Clinton County, Pennsylvania shootings =

Spree shooting in Pennsylvania, U.S.

1967 Clinton County, Pennsylvania spree shooting
- Location: Clinton County, Pennsylvania, U.S.
- Date: October 23, 1967
- Attack type: Mass shooting; mass murder; spree shooting; workplace violence
- Weapons: .45-caliber M1911 semi-automatic pistol; Smith & Wesson .38 caliber revolver
- Deaths: 8 (including the perpetrator and a victim who died in 1972)
- Injuries: 5
- Perpetrator: Leo Held

On October 23, 1967, a series of shootings occurred at several locations in Clinton County, Pennsylvania, United States. The gunman, 40-year-old Leo Held, opened fire at his workplace in Lock Haven, the William T. Piper Memorial Airport, and the home of one of his neighbors in Loganton, killing seven people (one of whom died five years later) and wounding five others. Held then engaged in a shootout with police, was mortally wounded, and died two days later in the hospital.

== Shootings ==
The shooter, 40-year-old Leo Held, left his home in Loganton armed with a .45-caliber semi-automatic pistol and a .38 caliber revolver. He arrived at his workplace, Hammermill Paper Company in Lock Haven, in the morning in his car. After parking outside, Held entered through the front door and fatally shot his boss, Carmen Edwards, through the heart from behind at the doorway leading to the mill's engine room. Held then walked up to the second-floor laboratory, where he fatally shot three of his co-workers and injured two others. While leaving the laboratory, Held wounded another co-worker before going to the main office and killing another employee. While leaving the office, he wounded a final co-worker and fled the building through the stock preparation room. Another co-worker, who was unaware of the shooting, walked past him due to Held's calm demeanor as he left.

Held then drove to William T. Piper Memorial Airport, then known simply as Lock Haven Airport, where he shot at Geraldine Ramm six times, striking her twice; he had previously carpooled with her. Held was escorted out without incident by the airport's manager, Howard Graves, who was apparently unaware that his employee had been shot and believed Held was committing a prank.

Held left the airport and circled in his car around Sugar Valley School, where three of his children attended. The school had been put on lockdown after police had informed the school's principal, William Harbach, of the shootings. Harbach, the school janitor, and several teachers fetched firearms from their homes and camped out near the school's entrances in case Held tried to approach the school. Held's children were separated from the rest of the students and informed that their father had been involved in a shooting.

Held then drove back to Loganton, where he entered the unlocked backdoor of his neighbor's house and went into their bedroom, fatally shooting Floyd Quiggle and wounding his wife Donna as they slept in their bed. Donna was paralyzed from the shoulders down as a result of the shooting, and she later died from issues with those wounds on October 13, 1972. The Quiggles' daughter, Joan, hid beneath her bed in her bedroom. Before returning to his house, Held stole weapons and ammunition from the Quiggle home.

Responding police officers encountered Held as he left his home through a side-door, and he was ordered to disarm himself. Held reportedly responded by telling officers to "come and get" his weapon. He then engaged in a shootout with police, during which Held's brother-in-law arrived at the scene and exposed himself to Held and pleaded with him to surrender, but Held continued exchanging gunfire with police before he was eventually mortally wounded.

== Victims ==
=== Dead ===
- Carmen Edwards, 62 (Hammermill)
- Elmer Weaver, 37 (Hammermill)
- Allen Barrett Jr., 44 (Hammermill)
- Richard Davenport, 32 (Hammermill)
- Donald Walden, 31 (Hammermill)
- Floyd Quiggle, 27 (Loganton)
- Donna Quiggle, 31 (Loganton; died of wounds in 1972)

=== Injured ===
- Richard Carter, 40 (Hammermill)
- James Allen, 47 (Hammermill)
- David Overdof, 27 (Hammermill)
- Woodrow Stultz, 46 (Hammermill)
- Geraldine Ramm, 37 (Lock Haven Airport)

== Perpetrator ==
Leo Held lived in Loganton with his wife Alda and their four children. Held had graduated from Sugar Valley High School in 1946 and had studied chemistry at Lock Haven State College. Two years after graduating high school Held had joined the Army where he served as a clerk in Japan. His parents, Clifford and Florence Held, had died in 1957 and 1958 respectively. Held had worked as a laboratory technician at Hammermill Paper Company for 19 years at the time of the shooting. Held had also volunteered at the local fire station and was an active member of his church. Held had also been elected to the Keystone Central School District school board in 1959 and served as president from 1963 to 1964.

A neighbor, Ella Knisely, had once gotten into an argument with Held over a fallen tree limb, which prompted him to attack her with the branch. However, when Knisely brought Held to court on assault and battery charges the magistrate threw out her case and Held's cross complaint against her.

After the shooting, Alda Held told the local newspaper, The Express, that she did not know why her husband committed the shootings. A doctor who treated Held a year before noted that he had been exhibiting paranoid tendencies. Police speculated that Held felt that he had been unjustly passed over for promotions, that Geraldine Ramm refused to carpool with Held anymore due to his alleged erratic driving, and that Held and Floyd Quiggle had feuded over smoke from a burn pile in the past. Police also said that co-workers in positions of power abused their position to "tease" Held. Held had paranoid tendencies, believing that his job was under constant threat of being taken from him and that his phone was being tapped. A staff member at the hospital Held was being treated at allegedly heard Held say that he had "one more to go" hours before he died, hinting that Held had at least one more target before he was stopped by police.

== See also ==
- 1969 Pennsylvania Turnpike shootings, a spree shooting in Pennsylvania which occurred two years later
