= Crossroads of the West Gun Shows =

Travelling gun show

Crossroads of the West Gun Shows is a travelling gun show, the largest in the United States. Their regular attendance of 10,000 was predicted to exceed 17,000 following the 2015 San Bernardino attack. As many as 1,400 vendors attend. It holds 60 shows a year. Total annual attendance exceeds 500,000. It is a member of the National Association of Arms Shows.

Crossroads of the West Gun Shows maintains a strict policy prohibiting loaded firearms or magazines on show premises. In 2015, after forty years in business, a man at a show in Phoenix, Arizona, accidentally shot a friend with a newly purchased antique firearm. The injury was non-life-threatening. A Taiwanese national was arrested in 2016 after purchasing 17,000 rounds of ammunition at a Crossroads of the West show.

Popular items include ammunition and civilian versions of M-16/M-4 style "black guns". Non-firearm merchandise includes swords, survival gear, and beef jerky.

People often attend with their families. At some venues concealed carry classes are offered.

Bob Templeton started the company in Salt Lake City in 1975 with his wife Lynn.
