= Gun Show Loophole Closing Act of 2009 =

The Gun Show Loophole Closing Act of 2009 and Gun Show Background Check Act of 2009 (H.R. 2324, S. 843) were pending pieces of legislation in the United States 111th Congress intended to change record keeping and background check requirements for sales of firearms at gun shows, and closing the gun show loophole. These bills were not brought to the floor of either chamber for a vote.

== Legislative history ==
The Senate bill, S. 843, was introduced by Sen. Frank Lautenberg [D-NJ] on April 21, 2009 to establish background check procedures for gun shows. The House bill, (H.R. 2324, was introduced by Rep. Michael Castle [R-DE] on May 7, 2009 to require criminal background checks on all firearms transactions occurring at gun shows. The House legislation had 112 cosponsors as of September 22, 2010, mostly Democrats, but includes Castle's fellow Republican Main Street Partnership member Rep. Mark Kirk [R-IL], as well as, Rep. Peter T. King [R-NY]. The Senate bill had 17 cosponsors as of April 15, 2010, all Democrats.

The Senate bill has been referred to the Senate Judiciary Committee and the House bill was referred to the House Judiciary Committee, who referred it to the Subcommittee on Crime, Terrorism, and Homeland Security on June 12, 2009.

== Provisions ==
House Bill Provisions Gun Show Loophole Closing Act of 2009 – Amends the federal criminal code to make it unlawful for any person to operate a gun show unless such person:

1. has attained 21 years of age;
2. is not prohibited from transporting, shipping, or receiving firearms and has not violated any federal firearms requirements;
3. has registered with the Attorney General as a gun show operator and has provided a photograph and fingerprints;
4. has not concealed material information nor made false statements in connection with a gun show operator registration; and
5. notifies the Attorney General of the date, time, and duration of a gun show not later than 30 days before the commencement of such show and verifies the identity of each vendor at the gun show. Imposes record-keeping requirements on gun show operators and criminal penalties for failure to register as a gun show operator and maintain required records. Grants the Attorney General authority to enter the business premises of any gun show operator, without a showing of reasonable cause or a warrant, to examine records and inventory to determine compliance with this Act. Increases criminal penalties for serious record-keeping violations and violations of criminal background check requirements. Authorizes the Director of the Bureau of Alcohol, Tobacco, Firearms, and Explosives (ATF) to hire additional investigators to carry out inspections of gun shows.

Senate Bill Provisions Gun Show Background Check Act of 2009 – Amends the Brady Handgun Violence Prevention Act to require registration of gun show promoters and to set forth the responsibilities of promoters, licensees, and other transferors. Provides that if any part of a firearm transaction takes place at a gun show, each licensed importer, manufacturer, and dealer who transfers one or more firearms to a person who is not licensed shall, within 10 days after the transfer, submit a report of the transfer to the Attorney General. Sets forth penalties for violations. Grants the Attorney General authority to enter the place of business of any gun show promoter and any place where a gun show is held, during business hours and without a showing of reasonable cause or a warrant, for purposes of examining records and the inventory of licensees conducting business to determine compliance with this Act. Increases penalties for:

1. serious record-keeping violations by licensees; and
2. violations of criminal background check requirements.

== Reception ==
The legislation was supported by the Brady Campaign To Prevent Gun Violence, who encouraged its members and supporters to contact their US Senators and Representatives urging them to cosponsor the legislation.

This legislation was opposed by gun rights organisations such as the NRA Institute for Legislative Action (NRA-ILA). NRA-ILA told NRA members that H.R. 2324 and S. 843 " would drive gun shows out of business."

== Legislative summary ==
Congress	Short title	Bill number(s)	Date introduced	Sponsor(s)	# of cosponsors	Latest status
111th Congress	Gun Show Loophole Closing Act of 2009 & Gun Show Background Check Act of 2009	H.R. 2324	May 7, 2009	Rep. Mike Castle (R-DE)	113	Referred to the Subcommittee on Crime, Terrorism, and Homeland Security 6/12/2009.
111th Congress	Gun Show Loophole Closing Act of 2009 & Gun Show Background Check Act of 2009	S. 843	April 21, 2009	Sen. Frank Lautenberg (D-NJ)	17	Referred to Senate Committee on the Judiciary 4/21/2009.
