= Buckskin (leather) =

Hide tanned using a Native American method

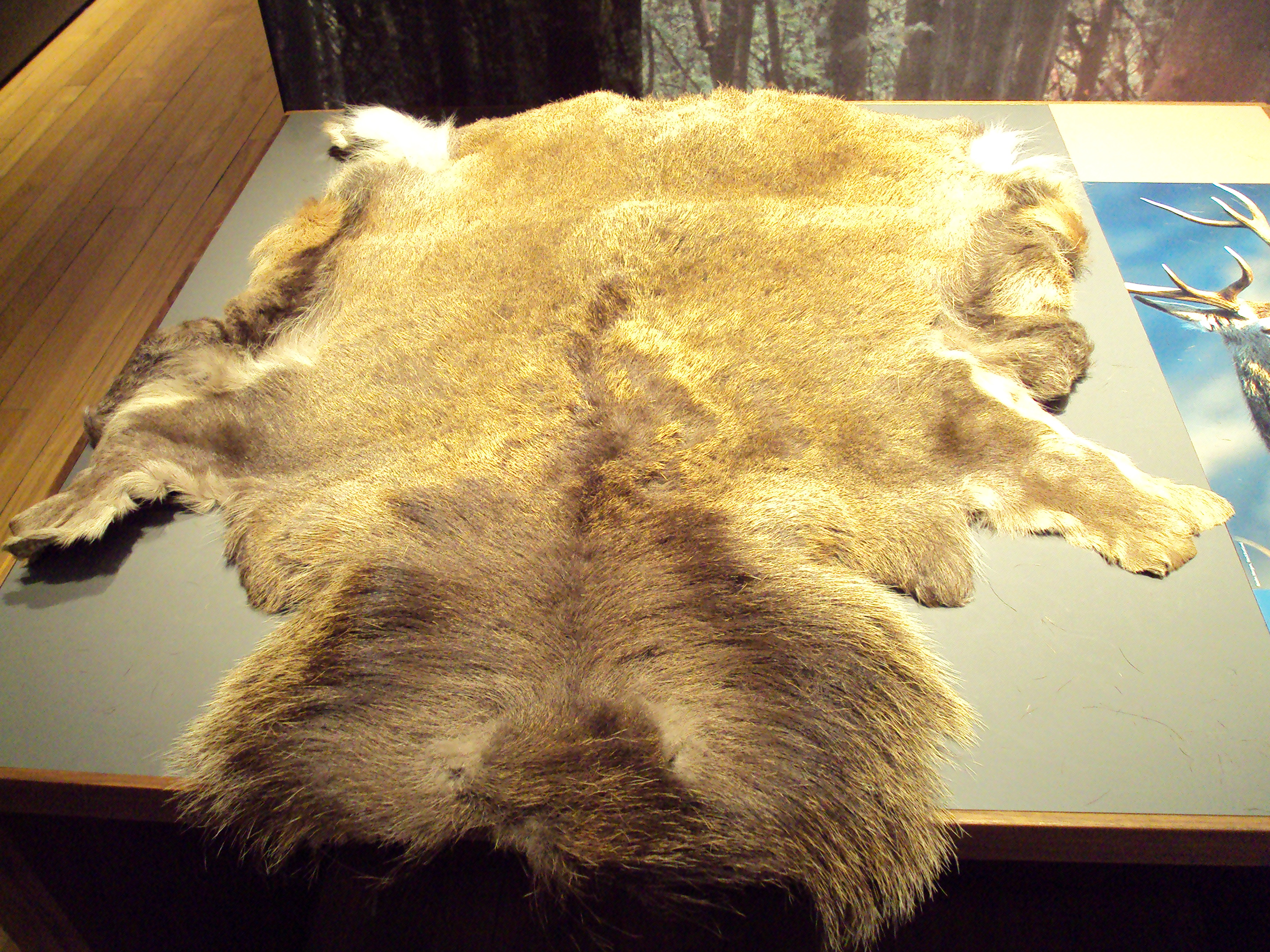
A deer skin at the Kelvingrove Art Gallery and Museum, Glasgow, Scotland

Buckskin is the soft, pliable, porous preserved hide of an animal—usually deer—tanned in the same way as deerskin clothing worn by Native Americans. Some leather sold as "buckskin" may now be sheepskin tanned with modern chromate tanning chemicals and dyed to resemble real buckskin.

Traditionally, Native Americans would scrape away the excessive fat clinging to the hide, and this would be followed by working the raw hide with the brain tissue of an animal. Afterwards, the raw hide is made to envelope a fire that emits wood smoke, and where the smoke is mostly trapped inside the raw hide for many hours. The combined application of brain tissue and smoke produces soft and pliable buckskin leather, with a dark honey color. This treatment differs from the traditional tanning methods used in other societies and cultures and is thought to be preferable to vegetable tanning methods where tannins are exclusively used. The finished product resembles chamois leather, but is stronger. Smoking gives to the leather its durability, and although buckskin may become slightly stiff when it dries after being wet, it quickly restores itself to its former soft-state by rubbing it with the hands. The application of wood smoke also deters insects from devouring it. Unsmoked buckskin is lighter, even white, in color.

Clothing made of buckskin is referred to as buckskins.

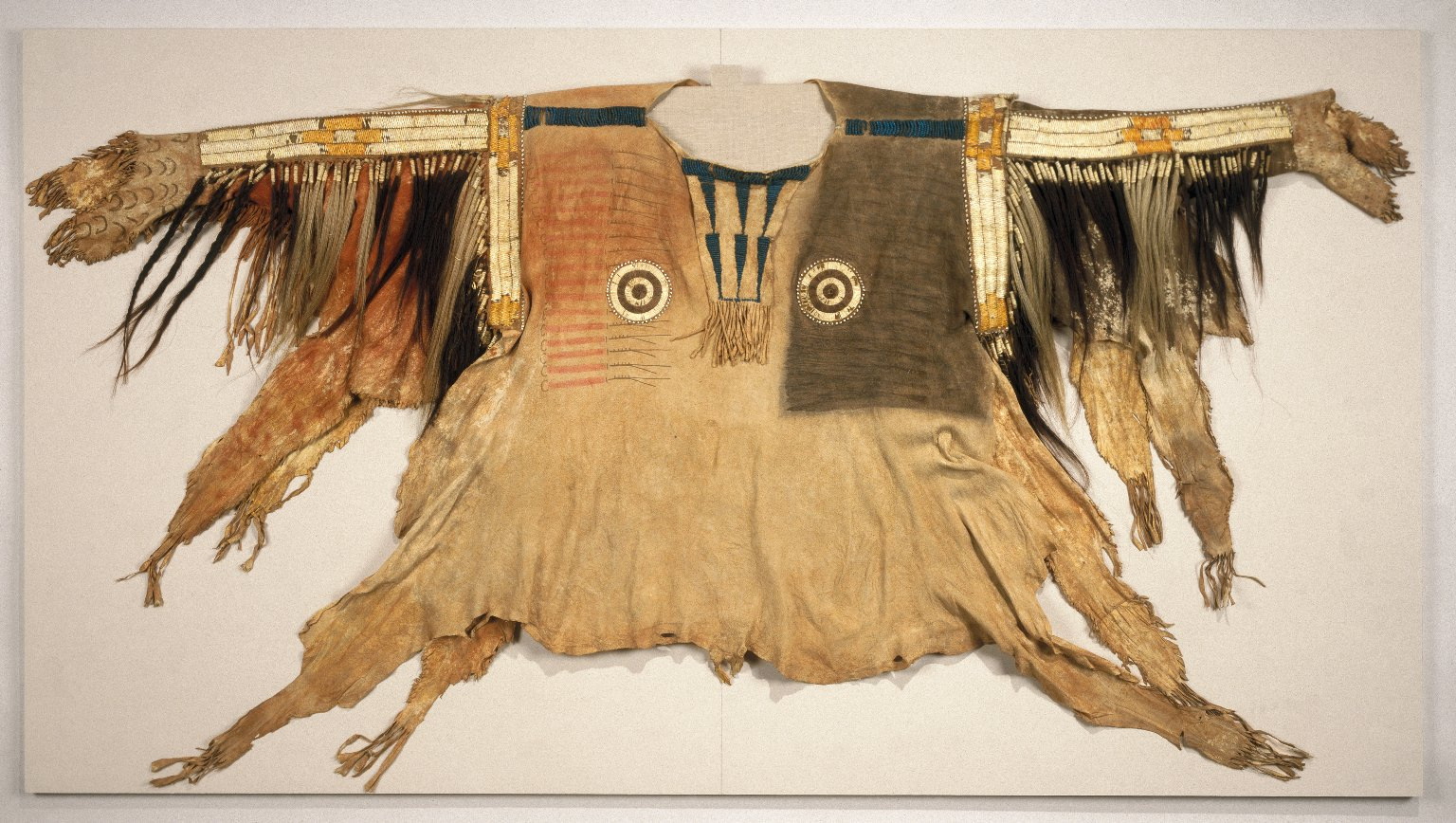
Shirt for Chief's War Dress, 19th century, Sioux, Brooklyn Museum
