= Gun laws in Puerto Rico =

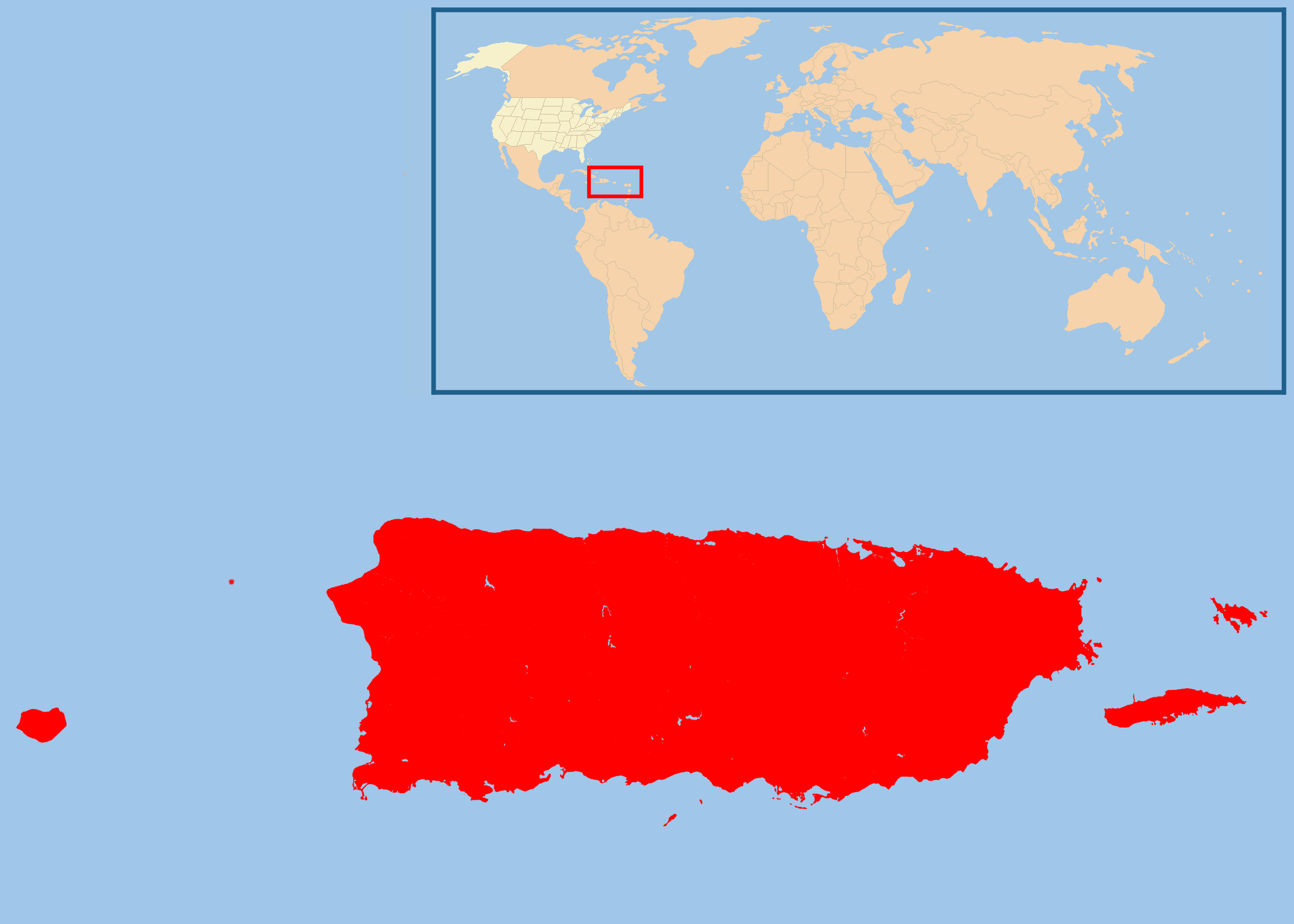
Location of Puerto Rico in relation to the continental United States

In Puerto Rico, the law regulates the sale, possession, and use of firearms and ammunition. As an unincorporated territory of the United States, Puerto Rico is an "appurtenant jurisdiction" to which the Insular Cases apply. Except for provisions of the U.S. Constitution that apply by their own force, only those constitutional provisions extended by Congress apply to any of the appurtenant jurisdictions.

Firearm licenses and firearm-related crimes are defined in Act 404 of 2000.

On December 11, 2019, Governor Wanda Vázquez Garced signed the Puerto Rico Weapons Act of 2020, which went into effect on January 1, 2020. The law lowered fees, implemented a shall issue regimen, combined the possession license and carry license into a single license, instituted carry reciprocity and stand your ground.

== Summary table ==
| Subject/law | Long guns | Handguns | Relevant statutes | Notes |
|---|---|---|---|---|
| Permit required to purchase? | Yes | Yes | | Permit is required to purchase a firearm in Puerto Rico from an FFL or Private Sale. The permit is the firearms license that doubles as a concealed carry license. |
| Firearm registration? | Yes | Yes | | The Puerto Rico Police maintains a registry not accessible by the public. |
| Assault weapon law? | No | No | | |
| Magazine capacity restriction? | No | No | | |
| Owner license required? | Yes | Yes | | As of January 1, 2020, the owner license and carry license are the same. |
| Permit required for concealed carry? | Yes | Yes | | As of January 1, 2020, shall-issue. Previously may-Issue according to law, but permits were rarely granted to ordinary citizens. Unrestricted concealed carry was technically allowed from June 20, 2015 to October 31, 2016 following a lawsuit challenging Puerto Rico's restrictive gun laws. The lower court ruling striking down many of the territory's laws was appealed by the government to the appeals court, which reversed the lower court's decision. The Puerto Rico Supreme Court declined to hear the appeal of the appeals court ruling from the plaintiffs in the case, effectively restoring Puerto Rico's restrictive permitting policy for concealed carry. |
| Open carry allowed? | No | No | | Permitless open carry was technically allowed from June 20, 2015, to November 16, 2016, following a lawsuit challenging Puerto Rico's restrictive gun laws. The lower court ruling striking down many of the territory's laws was appealed by the territorial government to the appeals court, which reversed the lower court's decision on November 16, 2016. The Puerto Rico Supreme Court has declined to hear the appeal of the appeals court ruling from the plaintiffs in the case, effectively restoring Puerto Rico's ban on open carry. |
| NFA weapons restricted? | Yes | Yes | | Suppressors and Machine Guns banned by state law. |
| Peaceable journey laws? | Yes | No | | Federal law (FOPA) applies. |
| Background checks required for private sales? | Yes | Yes | | Private sales transfers must be done through an FFL or the Puerto Rico Police. |

== Licensing process ==
Individuals seeking to obtain a firearms license in Puerto Rico must complete a notarized license application using form PR-329, Application for Weapons License. With the completed form, individuals must also provide proof of their social security number, proof of date of birth and legal presence in the territory, a copy of their drivers license or other form of non-passport identification, a recent headshot photo, certificate of negative criminal record no more than 30 days old, a $200 check, and must be fingerprinted by the Police Bureau. Additionally, the applicant must be at least 21 years of age and must not meet the definition of a prohibited person under Section 922(g) of the Gun Control Act of 1968. Given that the applicant meets these requirements, the law requires the Police Bureau to approve the application within 30 days of submission as of 2021. The license holder may only purchase ammunition of the firearms' caliber. After the license is granted, the police are authorized to "passively, without disturbing the peace and tranquility of the individual under investigation or violating the privacy of the home" continue investigating the license holder to ensure that no false information was provided by the applicant during the application process. The license must be renewed every five years by submitting a sworn statement and paying a $100 fee.

Applications for gun licenses rose by 70% after Hurricane Maria in 2017 due to concerns over the widespread electrical outage and police absenteeism.

== History ==
In 2015, as a result of a class-action lawsuit with over 800 plaintiffs, a lower court ruled that several provisions of the existing law were unconstitutional. The ruling was overturned after the state government appealed. The Puerto Rico Supreme Court declined to hear the case, leaving the appellate court's ruling in place.

In September 2016, a firearms instruction company sued the state government in federal court, arguing the unconstitutionality of several provisions of the law. There has been no ruling as of September 2020.
