= Gun shows in the United States =

Display and sales event for guns and related paraphernalia in the USA

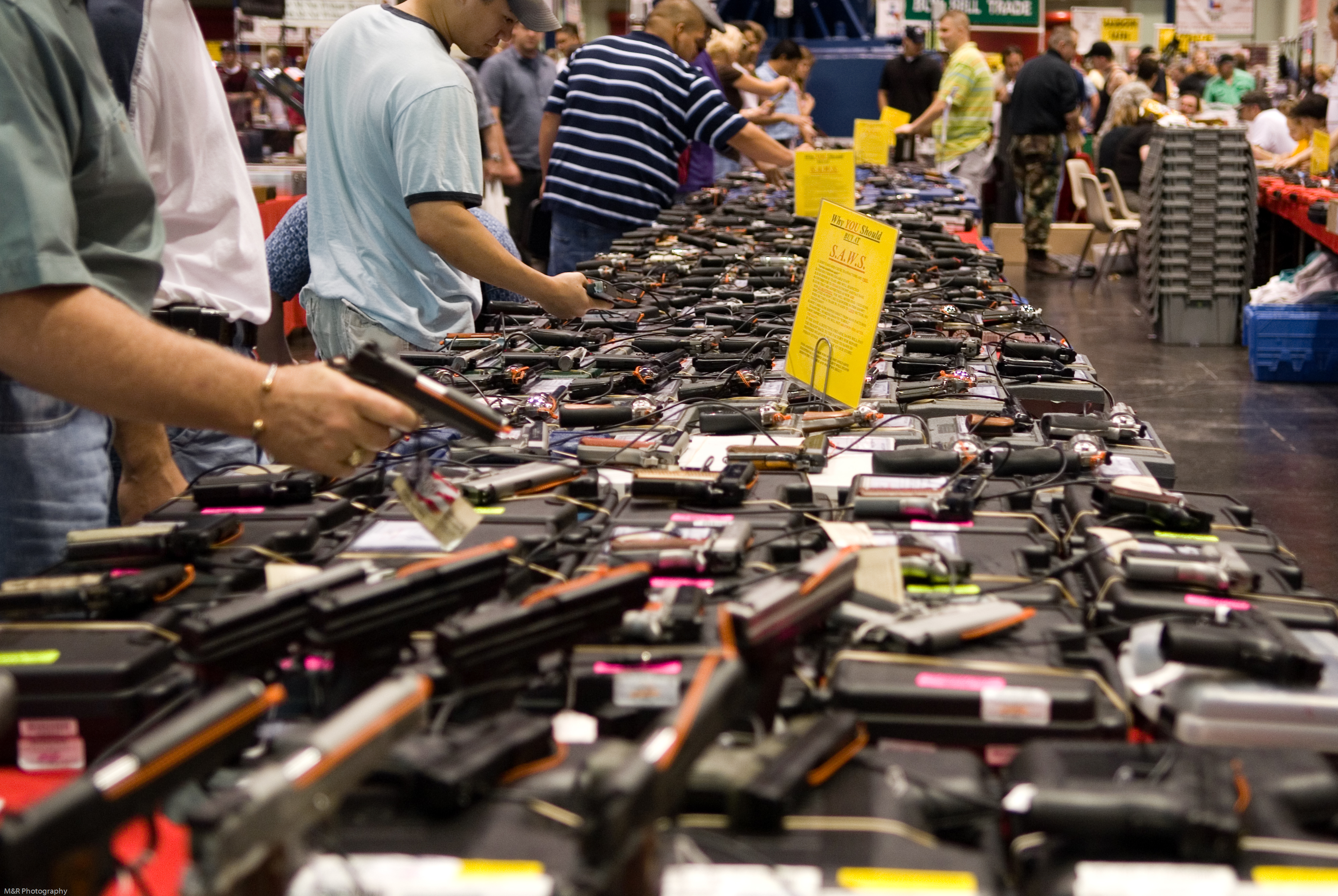
Houston gun show at the George R. Brown Convention Center in March 2007

In the United States, a gun show is an event where promoters generally rent large public venues and then rent tables for display areas for dealers of guns and related items, and charge admission for buyers. The majority of guns for sale at gun shows are modern sporting firearms. Approximately 5,000 gun shows occur annually in the United States.

== Venues and attendance ==
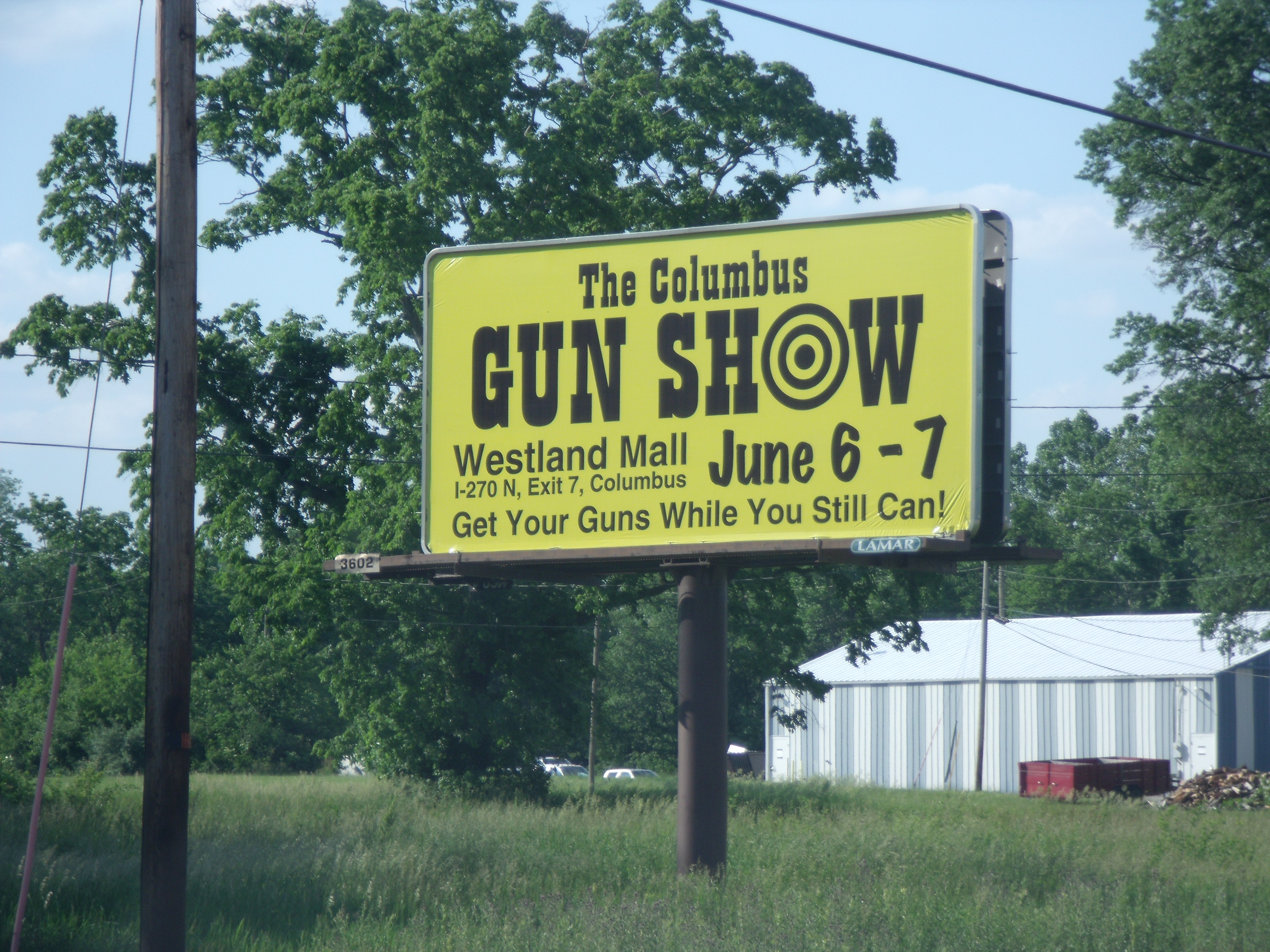
An advertisement for a gun show

Gun shows are typically held in large public facilities such as arenas, fairgrounds, civic centers, and armories. Show promoters charge vendors fees for display tables (from $20 to $145) and booths (from $200 to $400) and charge admission fees (from $5 to $50) for the public. In addition to guns, ammunition, knives, militaria, books and other items are sold.

In 2005, Michael Bouchard, Assistant Director/Field Operations of ATF, estimated that 5,000 gun shows take place each year in the United States. Most gun shows have 2,500 to 15,000 attendees over a two-day period. The number of tables at a gun show varies from as few as fifty to as many as 2,000. At the largest gun shows, over 1,000 firearms are sold over two days. In 2007, the U.S. Department of Justice (DOJ) reported that it found no definite numbers for U.S. gun shows, but said that estimates ranged from 2,000 to 5,200 a year. In 1999, the ATF reported that 4,442 gun shows were advertised in 1998 in Gun Show Calendar.

=== SHOT Show ===
The largest gun show in the United States is the annual SHOT Show. Only trade professionals, such as buyers for retail stores or law enforcement agencies, are allowed entry. It has attracted over 60,000 attendees to its 630,000 square feet of exhibition space in Las Vegas. The show is sponsored by the National Shooting Sports Foundation, an industry group of firearms and hunting businesses. It is among the top 25 trade shows in the country.

== Restrictions ==
Under the Gun Control Act of 1968 (GCA), firearm dealers with a Federal Firearms License (FFL) were prohibited from doing business at gun shows (they were only permitted to do business at the address listed on their license). That changed with the enactment of the Firearm Owners Protection Act of 1986 (FOPA), which allows FFLs to transfer firearms at gun shows provided they follow the provisions of the GCA and other pertinent federal regulations. In 1999, ATF reported that between 50% and 75% of the vendors at gun shows had FFLs. Only buyers from within the state may purchase handguns.

== Gun show loophole ==
The "gun show loophole" refers to the lack of a federal requirement to perform background checks on buyers of firearms from private sellers, including those done at gun shows. Private sellers in some states do not need to perform background checks but are usually required to record the sale and/or ask for identification depending on the state or county. There are some Federal rules regarding the sales. As of August 2013, 33 states do not require background checks for sales of firearms by private individuals, while 17 states and Washington, D.C., do require background checks for some or all private firearm sales. This is in contrast to sales by gun stores and other Federal Firearms License holders, who are required by federal law to perform background checks of all buyers, and to record all sales, regardless of venue (i.e. private sales).

== Research and studies ==
In 2000, the Bureau of Alcohol, Tobacco and Firearms (ATF) published "Following the Gun", its analysis of more than 1,530 trafficking investigations over a two-and-a-half-year period and found gun shows to have the second highest number of trafficked guns per investigation, after corrupt FFL dealers. (Straw purchasers were the most common channel, but averaged a relatively small number of trafficked guns per investigation compared to corrupt FFLs and gun shows.) These investigations involved a total of 84,128 firearms that had been diverted from legal to illegal commerce. All told, the report identified more than 26,000 firearms that had been illegally trafficked through gun shows in 212 separate investigations. The report stated that:

A prior review of ATF gun show investigations shows that prohibited persons, such as convicted felons and juveniles, do personally buy firearms at gun shows and gun shows are sources of firearms that are trafficked to such prohibited persons. The gun show review found that firearms were diverted at and through gun shows by straw purchasers, unregulated private sellers, and licensed dealers. Felons were associated with selling or purchasing firearms in 46 percent of the gun show investigations. Firearms that were illegally diverted at or through gun shows were recovered in subsequent crimes, including homicide and robbery, in more than a third of the gun show investigations.

A Bureau of Justice Statistics (BJS) report on "Firearms Use by Offenders" found that only 0.8% of prison inmates reported acquiring firearms used in their crimes "At a gun show", with repeat offenders less likely than first-time offenders to report acquiring firearms from a retail source, gun show or flea market. This 2001 study examined data from a 1997 Department of Justice survey of more than 18,000 federal and state prison inmates in 1,409 State prisons and 127 Federal prisons. The remaining 99.2% of inmates reported obtaining firearms from other sources, including "From a friend/family member" (36.8%), "Off the street/from a drug dealer" (20.9%), "From a fence/black market source" (9.6%), "From a pawnshop", "From a flea market", "From the victim", or "In a burglary". 9% of inmates replied "Don't Know/Other" to the question of where they acquired a firearm and 4.4% refused to answer. The Department of Justice did not attempt to verify the firearms reported in the survey or trace them to determine their chain of possession from original retail sale to the time they were transferred to the inmates surveyed (in cases where inmates were not the original retail purchaser).

Garen Wintemute, a professor of emergency room medicine and director of UC Davis' Violence Prevention Research Program, released a study in 2007 which held that gun shows are a venue for illegal activity, including straw purchases and unlicensed sales to prohibited individuals.

In 2011, economists Mark Duggan and Randi Hjalmarsson at the University of Maryland and Brian Jacob from the University of Michigan released a paper which stated that gun shows do not lead to substantial increases in either gun homicides or gun suicides.

== ATF criminal investigations at gun shows ==
From 2004 to 2006, ATF conducted surveillance and undercover investigations at 195 gun shows (approximately 2% of all shows). Specific targeting of suspected individuals (77%) resulted in 121 individual arrests and 5,345 firearms seizures. Seventy nine of the 121 ATF operation plans were known suspects previously under investigation.

Additionally, ATF Field Offices report that:

- Between 2002 and 2005, more than 400 guns legally purchased at gun shows from licensed dealers in the city of Richmond, Virginia, were later recovered in connection with criminal activity. Bouchard said, "These figures do not take into account firearms that may have been sold at Richmond area gun shows by unlicensed sellers, as these transactions are more difficult to track." It is noteworthy that the "in connection with criminal activity" category includes stolen guns later recovered from burglaries, but the report does not specify how many guns in the 400 gun figure cited were not guns used in the commission of a crime, but that were rather the fruits of criminal activity.
- The Department of Justice reports, "after reviewing hundreds of trace reports associated with guns used in crime recovered in the New Orleans area and interviewing known gang members and other criminals, ATF Special Agents identified area gun shows as a source used by local gang members and other criminals to obtain guns."
- In 2003 and 2004, the San Francisco ATF Field Division conducted six general operations at Reno, Nevada, gun shows to investigate interstate firearms trafficking. During these operations, "agents purchased firearms and identified violations related to "off paper" sales, sales to out-of-state residents, and dealing in firearms without a license." The "ATF seized or purchased 400 firearms before making arrests and executing search warrants, which resulted in the seizure of an additional 600 firearms and the recovery of explosives."
- ATF's Columbus Field Division conducted its anti-trafficking operations based on intelligence from Cleveland police that "many of the guns recovered in high-crime areas of the city had been purchased at local gun shows." Subsequent gun show sting operations resulted in the seizure of "5 guns, one indictment, and two pending indictments for felony possession of a firearm." The state of Ohio is one of the top ten source states for recovered guns used in crime.
- The ATF's Phoenix Field Division reported that "many gun shows attracted large numbers of gang members from Mexico and California. They often bought large quantities of assault weapons and smuggled them into Mexico or transported them to California." Garen Wintemute, a professor at the University of California at Davis, calls Arizona and Texas a "gunrunner's paradise".

Regarding the trafficking of firearms from the U.S. into Mexico, the U.S. Government Accountability Office (GAO) issued a report in June 2009 that stated:

While it is impossible to know how many firearms are illegally smuggled into Mexico in a given year, about 87 percent of firearms seized by Mexican authorities and traced in the last 5 years originated in the United States, according to data from Department of Justice's Bureau of Alcohol, Tobacco, Firearms and Explosives (ATF). According to U.S. and Mexican government officials, these firearms have been increasingly more powerful and lethal in recent years. Many of these firearms come from gun shops and gun shows in Southwest border states.

The GAO report has been corroborated through other sources. William Newell, Special Agent in Charge of ATF's Phoenix Field Division, testified before a U.S. House of Representatives subcommittee in March 2009, stating, "Drug traffickers are able to obtain firearms and ammunition more easily in the U.S., including sources in the secondary market such as gun shows and flea markets. Depending on State law, the private sale of firearms at those venues often does not require record keeping or background checks prior to the sale." The ATF has also reported that, "Trends indicate the firearms illegally crossing the U.S.-Mexico border are becoming more powerful. ATF has analyzed firearms seizures in Mexico from FY 2005–07 and identified the following weapons most commonly used by drug traffickers: 9mm pistols; .38 Super pistols; 5.7mm pistols; .45-caliber pistols; AR-15 type rifles; and AK-47 type rifles." However, this is based only on the weapons sent to the ATF to be traced, a small portion of all firearms seized by the Mexican government, and the extent to which they are representative of all seized firearms is disputed. According to Raul Benitez, a security expert at the National Autonomous University of Mexico, "Mexico's southern border with Guatemala has long been an entry point for such weapons and today could account for 10 to 15 percent coming through." William La Jeunesse and Maxim Lott have described Mexico as a "virtual arms bazaar", where one can purchase a wide variety of military weapons from international sources: "fragmentation grenades from South Korea, AK-47s from China, and shoulder-fired rocket launchers from Spain, Israel and former Soviet bloc manufacturers." In addition, they say that Mexican drug cartels have long-established drug- and gun-running ties with Latin American revolutionary movements such as Colombia's FARC. Further, China has supplied military arms to Latin America and Chinese-made assault weapons have been recovered in Mexico, according to Amnesty International. Finally, the Mexican army has seen rampant desertion rates (150,000 in the last six years) and many soldiers have taken their weapons home with them, including Belgian-made M16s.

It is difficult to legally acquire fully automatic firearms at American gun shows (as opposed to the semiautomatic-only versions of these firearms that are legal on the U.S. civilian market), due to National Firearms Act (NFA). To legally purchase or transfer a fully automatic firearm, U.S. citizens must pay a $200 transfer tax, submit a full set of fingerprints on FBI Form FD-258, obtain certification provided by a chief law enforcement officer ("CLEO": the local chief of police, sheriff of the county, head of the State police, or State or local district attorney or prosecutor), and obtain final approval from the BATF on a Form 4 transfer of NFA registration to the new owner. All private citizens must wait, typically months, before receiving the tax stamp for the $200 tax paid, authorizing taking possession of the already paid-for fully automatic firearm. Until in receipt of the tax stamp, the Class III dealer retains control of the fully automatic firearm. In addition, only fully automatic firearms manufactured before the Firearm Owner's Protection Act of 1986 are permitted to be transferred. No fully automatic firearms recovered in Mexico have been traced to the United States.

== See also ==
- Arms trafficking
- Brady Handgun Violence Prevention Act
- Crossroads of the West Gun Shows
- Gun Show Loophole Closing Act of 2009
- National Instant Criminal Background Check System
- Small arms trade
- Universal background check
