= 2019 Midland–Odessa shootings =

Spree shooting in Texas, U.S.

Midland–Odessa shootings
- Odessa truck windshield damaged in the shooting

- Midland–Odessa (Texas) Midland–Odessa (the United States)
- Location: Midland/Odessa, Texas, U.S.
- Date: August 31, 2019; 3:17 p.m. – 4:20 p.m. (CDT UTC−05:00)
- Attack type: Spree shooting; Drive-by shooting; Mass shooting; Mass Murder
- Weapon: Anderson Manufacturing AM-15 AR-15–style rifle
- Deaths: 8 (including the perpetrator)
- Injuries: 25 (24 by gunshot and 1 by glass shards)
- Perpetrator: Seth Aaron Ator
- Motive: Unknown (believed to be mental illness)

On August 31, 2019, a spree shooting occurred in the West Texas cities of Midland and Odessa, involving a gunman shooting multiple people from a vehicle. Eight people were killed, including the perpetrator, and twenty-five people were injured, including three police officers. It was the third major mass shooting to take place in the United States in August 2019, following the El Paso Walmart shooting and the Dayton shooting (both of which took place 13 hours apart).

Authorities identified the shooter as 36-year-old Seth Aaron Ator from Lorena, Texas, a man who had been fired from his job the morning of the shooting spree. He was later shot and killed by police outside a movie theater in Odessa.

== Events ==
=== Preceding ===
At 1:27 p.m., Odessa Police Department responded to a call by Ator's former employer for a disturbance. Before the call, Ator was in the process of being terminated from his job for being rude to other employees at a contracted jobsite, but he became agitated and refused to hand over property belonging to the company. Ator started accusing the company of distributing child pornography before leaving. Ator got in his car and rammed through the business's fence as he left. While Odessa Police responded to the disturbance call, Ator contacted 911 and his call was transferred to the officers responding to the disturbance call. He started rambling about a cult stalking him and posting child pornography. He made claims that the employer kidnapped him and forced him to watch child pornography. He also demanded the police to help him track down the people stalking him, and that he would start shooting if any law enforcement tried to kidnap him. The police received several calls of a man, matching Ator's description, driving erratically and displaying a rifle. The police decided to wait for Ator, at the business, in case he would do a mass shooting there. They also deployed other units to keep track of Ator's location and search his address.

=== Shooting ===
The shooting spree began at 3:17 p.m. during a traffic stop on Interstate 20, where a Texas state trooper was shot while attempting to stop a gold 1999 Toyota Camry over a failure to signal a left turn. Ator fired several rounds into the state trooper car's windshield and injured one of the officers. The other officer fired back with a handgun as Ator drove along the Interstate 20. Ator stopped his car again to fire at the state troopers before driving away. The state troopers were unable to start a car chase due to the officer being injured. As Ator drove along Interstate 20, he shot into several vehicles as he passed by them. During the time, he called 911 and berated the operators as he fired his rifle. Ator eventually dropped the call, turned onto East Loop 338, and left the highway. On the highway, two motorists were killed and eight were left wounded, including the state trooper. Over the course of the entire massacre, several more vehicles were shot with the occupants uninjured.

Ator continued into Odessa, Texas, through East Loop 338 and wounded two more motorists as he drove north. He turned right onto a commercial parking lot, in TX-191, and drove around in a loop. During the loop, he cut through the parking lot and entered TX-191 westbound. He shot a motorist as he drove west, before turning right onto East Loop 338 again. Ator drove north before performing a U-turn. Ator drove southbound on East Loop 338 before driving onto TX-191 westbound. Ator entered the parking lot of a car dealership and stopped his car. He waved at a family standing outside the dealership before opening fire. He killed the teenage daughter of the family and wounded the son before driving off. Ator drove onto Preston Smith Road before turning right onto East 42nd Street. As Ator drove west on East 42nd Street, he shot into three vehicles, injuring four people, including a 17-month-old child. Ator reached an intersection and turned left onto John Ben Shepperd Parkway. As he made the turn, Ator wounded three motorists (2 directly and 1 via glass shards). Ator drove south on JBS Parkway and shot a man in a commercial parking lot in a drive-by style shooting. Ator turned right and drove onto Maple Avenue. While driving westbound on Maple Avenue, he fired at a car without injuring anyone. At this point, Ator drove in a westward direction with minor deviations as he drove through the residential area of Odessa. Ator eventually turned onto East 38th Street from North Everglade Avenue, and shot a female motorist at the intersection of North Dixie Boulevard and East 38th Street. Ator turned onto Adams Avenue and stopped his Toyota Camry next to a United States Postal Service-labeled Ram C/V Tradesman.

Ator fired his rifle several times before dragging a 29-year-old letter carrier out of her mail van. He killed her, transferred items from his Toyota to the mail van, and hijacked the letter carrier's vehicle. In the hijacked van, Ator continued driving south on Adams Avenue and turned onto East 36th Street. He turned onto Walnut Avenue and drove northbound. At the intersection, Ator turned west and drove onto the rear driveway of a house at the corner of East 38th Street and Walnut Avenue before killing a man inside the home from outside. While shooting the man, he also injured another person in the area before performing a U-turn in an adjacent alleyway and driving back to Walnut Avenue to head south.

For several minutes, Ator drove around Odessa without firing at anyone. Ator resumed shooting people when he fatally shot a motorist on East Yukon Road while driving eastbound near an intersection between East Yukon Road and North Grandview Avenue. Ator continued driving east, until he turned south onto Faudree Road. He fatally shot a man in his car at the intersection of TX-191 and Faudree Road. Ator turned left onto the south road of TX-191 and injured a motorist as he drove northeast. Ator was heading in the direction of the Cinergy movie theater. However, for unknown reasons, Ator then made a turn towards the parking lot of MCH Procare, a hospital. As he drove into the parking lot, he briefly passed the Chris Kyle memorial. Ator drove through the parking lot of the hospital and shot at two police vehicles, injuring two officers, as he left the parking lot. Ator made a turn onto Dr. Emmitt Headlee Street and drove east towards the evacuated Cinergy Odessa movie theater. Ator sped down the road towards a police roadblock consisting of two patrol vehicles with the intent of ramming through the barricade. One of the officers, blocking the road, intentionally struck the USPS van with his own vehicle and lessened the impact of the crash. The van finally stopped, and Ator tried to fire at police officers from within the van. Ator was quickly neutralized after a brief gun battle, where he was shot at least 16 times.

There was initial confusion over where the perpetrator was and how many individuals were involved. The confusion is apparent over the police scanner where one officer states about twenty minutes after the first officer was shot; "We're getting multiple calls for different victims in different locations. I've got people talking on four different channels, I'm not clear on anything, you're all talking."

== Victims ==
Seven people, ranging in age from 15 to 57, were killed. Seventeen more were hospitalized for injuries. Among the injured were three police: a Texas state trooper, a Midland police officer, and an Odessa police officer. The youngest victim was a wounded 17-month-old child. One of the dead was a USPS postal worker, age 29, who had been driving the postal service truck Ator hijacked.

== Perpetrator ==
The day after the shooting, police identified the shooter as 36-year-old Seth Aaron Ator (September 17, 1982 – August 31, 2019) of Lorena, Texas. Officials initially refused to identify Ator as they did not want to give him any notoriety. Ator was born in Amarillo, Texas, and moved to Lorena in January 1995. Ator withdrew from Lorena High School in November 2000 to enroll in a GED program, which he later enrolled in McLennan Community College in Waco, Texas in 2005. He was arrested in Waco in 2001 for trespassing and evading arrest for trying to break into a woman's bedroom after threatening to kill her brother, which he pleaded guilty to in 2002.

Ator lived in West Odessa in Ector County in "a metal shack that lacked electricity, plumbing, a floor and even furniture"; he lived alone, except for a small dog. A neighbor said that, well before his killing spree, he had yelled at her while carrying a large rifle. She also said he sometimes shot animals from his roof, which she had complained to police about, but they never responded to her complaint. Another neighbor told the Associated Press that her family had lived near Ator for the past five months and were afraid of him due to his tendency to shoot rabbits in the nighttime and him banging on their door early one morning.

In January 2014, Ator failed a national criminal background check when he tried to purchase a gun; the system flagged him as ineligible because of a prior local court determination that he was mentally unfit. According to law enforcement officials, Ator subsequently bought the gun used in the shooting via a private sale, without having to go through a background check.

== Investigation ==
On September 1, the FBI said it was executing a search warrant at the suspect's house, located about 20 minutes west of Odessa. On September 2, at a press conference, FBI agent Christopher Combs said that the perpetrator turned up for work "enraged". Ator was fired from his job at Journey Oilfield Services hours before the shooting. Fifteen minutes before his encounter with troopers, Ator phoned a national tip line. Agent Combs described the call as "rambling statements about some of the atrocities that he felt that he had gone through", adding "He did not make a threat during that phone call". FBI agents attempted to identify and locate the caller, but were unable to do so in the fifteen minutes before the shooting began. Police said Ator used an AR-15 type rifle in the shooting, but did not say where he obtained it.

On September 4, The Wall Street Journal and news station KCBD reported that the FBI and law enforcement in Lubbock served a search warrant to a person of interest, suspected of illegally manufacturing and selling the rifle in connection with the shooting.

Investigation showed that the rifle used in the shooting was purchased on October 8, 2016 from Marcus Anthony Braziel, 45, of Lubbock, Texas. Braziel pleaded guilty in October 2020 to one count of dealing firearms without a license and one count of subscribing to a false tax return related to his firearm dealing. He was sentenced to 24 months in federal prison. In a four-year span, Mr. Braziel inadvertently sold firearms to four prohibited persons: a convicted felon, a man under felony indictment, an immigrant in the U.S. illegally, and Mr. Ator, a man who the courts previously deemed unfit to possess a firearm.

== Aftermath ==
The University of Texas of the Permian Basin was placed on lockdown due to its proximity to the shooting.

Multiple politicians issued statements about the shooting, including President Donald Trump, Texas Senator Ted Cruz, Texas Representative Mike Conaway, Texas Governor Greg Abbott, and Texas Attorney General Ken Paxton. Democrats generally urged more gun restriction laws, while Republicans offered prayers, called for cultural changes, and pointed out mental illness issues.

Texas State Representative Matt Schaefer, a Republican from Tyler, rejected calls for tighter gun restrictions, which he described as violating "God-given" gun rights; instead, Schaefer advocated a "YES to God" and a "YES to praying for protection". Schaefer's comments received national attention.

On September 4, Democrats in the Texas House held five press conferences in Houston, Dallas, San Antonio, Austin, and El Paso. Sixty-one members of the House Democratic Caucus signed a letter delivered to Governor Abbott asking him to call an emergency special session "on protecting Texans from gun violence," urging him to address the gun violence epidemic. In a statement, Abbott spokesman John Wittman said "Governor Abbott made clear in Odessa that all strategies are on the table that will lead to laws that make Texans safer. But that doesn’t include a helter-skelter approach that hastily calls for perfunctory votes that divide legislators along party lines. Instead, the Governor seeks consensus rather than division, The Democrats who are part of today’s partisan pitch can be part of the bi-partisan legislative process announced yesterday that is geared toward achieving real solutions, or they can be part of politics as usual that will accomplish nothing. Legislating on tough issues is hard and takes time. If Democrats really want to change the law, they need to stop talking to cameras and start talking to colleagues in the Capitol to reach consensus." In response, Donna Howard of the Texas House of Representatives, at a press conference in Austin said: "You know who can build a consensus is the Governor. If the Governor speaks up and says he will get behind certain legislation, we will have a consensus..."

Also on September 4, during a visit with Midland and Odessa city and law enforcement leaders to talk about ways to prevent mass shootings, Cruz spoke with a local news station saying: "Much of my discussions with law enforcer [sic] today was what were the warning signs that we had that this individual had a serious mental illness that posed a danger to himself or to others... What could we have done better to stop this deranged criminal from getting a gun in the first place? And that’s going to be an ongoing discussion."

On September 5, Abbott issued eight executive orders in response to the El Paso and Odessa-Midland mass shootings, in a statement Abbott said: “Texas must achieve several objectives to better protect our communities and our residents from mass shootings, I will continue to work expeditiously with the legislature on laws to keep guns out of the hands of dangerous criminals, while safeguarding the 2nd Amendment rights of law-abiding Texans.”

Marcus Anthony Braziel, 45, of Lubbock, was sentenced to two years in prison in January 2021 for illegally selling the AR-15 style rifle that Seth Aaron Ator used in the shooting.

A memorial plaza, called the Bright Star Memorial Plaza, was opened on the University of Texas Permian Basin campus in August 2024.

== See also ==
- List of shootings in Texas
- 1969 Pennsylvania Turnpike shootings
