= 1969 Pennsylvania Turnpike shootings =

Spree shooting in Pennsylvania, U.S.

- Location: 40.1298°N 75.7914°W; Pennsylvania Turnpike (East of Harrisburg), U.S.
- Date: April 5, 1969; 10:17 a.m. – 11:30 a.m. (EST)
- Attack type: Spree shooting; mass shooting; mass murder; murder-suicide
- Weapons: M1 carbine Marlin 336 .30-caliber carbine
- Deaths: 5 (including the perpetrator)
- Injuries: 16
- Perpetrator: Donald Martin Lambright

On April 5, 1969, Donald Martin Lambright, son of comedian Stepin Fetchit, was traveling along the Pennsylvania Turnpike, east of Harrisburg, Pennsylvania, when he went on a shooting spree. Reportedly, he injured sixteen and killed four, including his wife, with an M1 carbine and a .30-caliber Marlin 336 carbine, before turning one of the rifles on himself.

The shooting was officially ruled a murder-suicide, but the account of the circumstances upon which the ruling was based was questioned by Lambright's daughter and discussed at length in her 2005 self-published book about Stepin Fetchit. In a Los Angeles Times interview, Lincoln Perry stated his belief that his son was set up. Lambright's involvement with the Black Power movement at the peak of the COINTELPRO program was believed to be related to his death.

== Victims ==
Traveling in the same car was the Keenan family:

- Ignatius Keenan, dead
- Ruby Keenan, dead
- Paul Keenan, injured

Critically injured:

- Vincent Saitta, shot in the head; died at Harrisburg Hospital on May 9, 1969.
- George A. Bonsell, injured
- Ernest R. Stephens, injured
- Kim Stevens, injured

Traveling in the same car were the shooter and his wife:

- Donald Martin Lambright, the shooter, committed suicide
- Annette Lambright, his wife, dead

== Perpetrator ==
Donald Martin Lambright (born Donald Martin Perry; May 21, 1938 – April 5, 1969) was the biological son of comedian Stepin Fetchit, though they only met two years before Lambright's death. A child of divorce, he took the name of his stepfather, Dr. Middleton Hugher Lambright Jr. (November 7, 1908 - June 14, 1999), a thoracic surgeon in Cleveland. He grew up in New York City and Cleveland. He studied political science at Lincoln University in Oxford, Pennsylvania, after being discharged from the US Air Force in 1961, following four years of service and two tours in Vietnam. Just before the shooting, he quit his job at the Ohio state employment office in Cleveland.

== See also ==
- 1967 Clinton County, Pennsylvania spree shootings, a spree shooting in Pennsylvania which occurred two years earlier
- Midland–Odessa shootings, a shooting that also occurred along a highway
