= Gun laws in the Northern Mariana Islands =

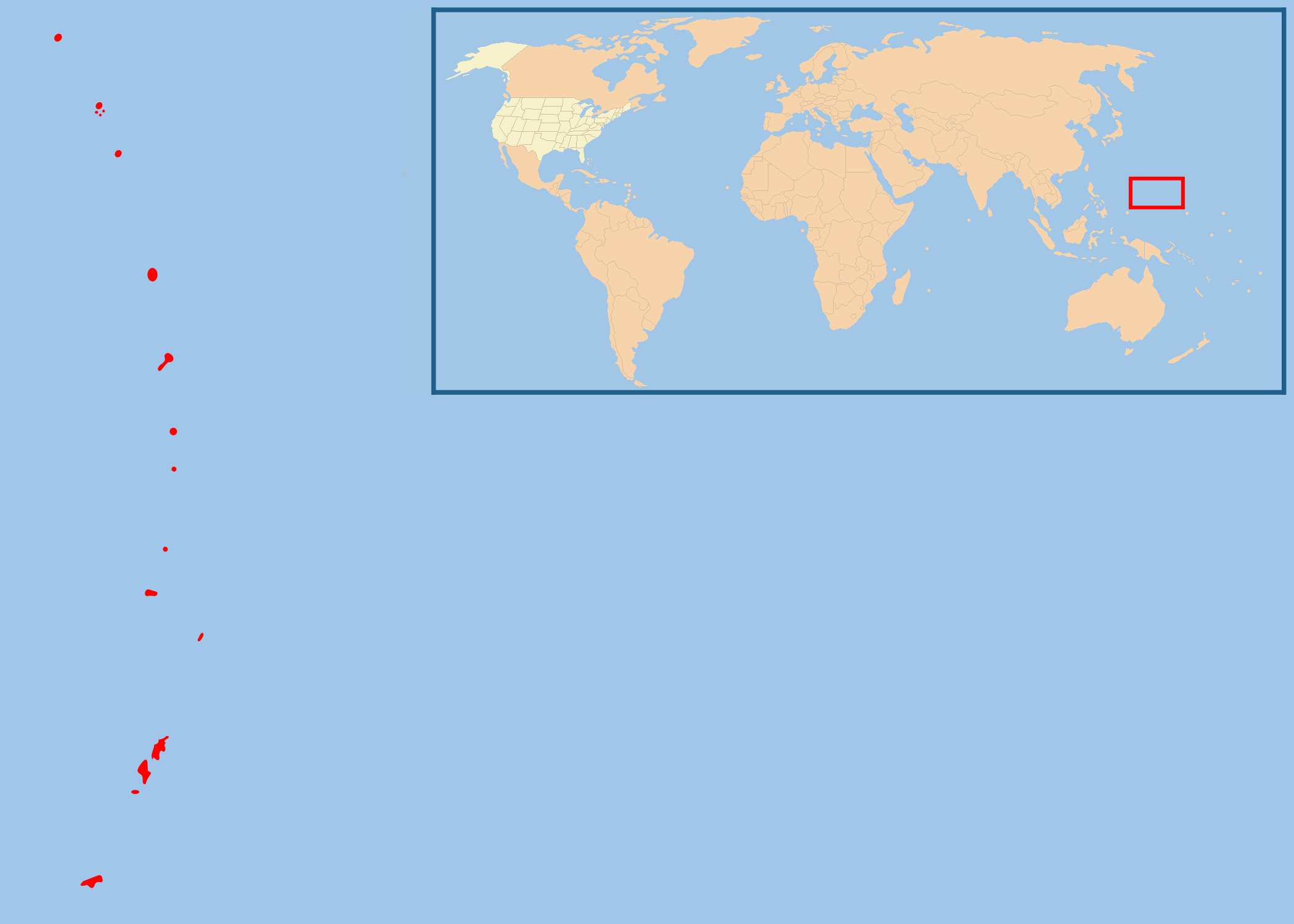
Location of the Northern Mariana Islands in relation to the continental United States

Gun laws in the Northern Mariana Islands regulate the sale, possession, and use of firearms and ammunition in the Commonwealth of the Northern Mariana Islands. As the Northern Mariana Islands is a commonwealth of the United States, many federal laws apply, as well as Constitutional rulings and protections.

== Summary table ==
Subject/law	Long guns	Handguns	Relevant statutes	Notes
Permit required to purchase?	Yes	Yes		A license is required to purchase guns or ammunition.
Firearm registration?	No	No		Registration of firearms has been ruled unconstitutional.
Assault weapon law?	No	No		Ban on assault weapons was ruled unconstitutional.
Magazine capacity restriction?	Yes*	Yes*		No magazines over 10 rounds. The Attorney General's Office has allowed the US Postal Service in the CNMI to issue standard capacity magazines which hold more than 10 rounds.
License required for concealed carry?	—N/a	No		Concealed carry is banned.
License required for open carry?	—N/a	No		The general ban on carrying operable firearms in public was ruled unconstitutional. Lawful gun owners may carry loaded handguns openly as long as other laws are not violated, such as gun-free zones.
NFA weapons restricted?	Yes	Yes		Short barreled shotguns, short barreled rifles, machine guns, suppressors, and grenade launchers are prohibited.
Peaceable journey laws?	No	No		Federal law (FOPA) applies.

== History ==
=== Weapons Control Act ===
The CNMI gradually became part of the United States, effective in 1976, 1978, and 1986. Pub. L. 94-241, Act of March 24, 1976.

The Weapons Control Act had been enacted by the Trust Territory of the Pacific Islands, 63 TTC §§ 551 et seq., before the CNMI joined the U.S.

Under this law, all firearms—including automatic weapons, semi-automatic assault weapons, and handguns—were prohibited from civilian possession. Civilians could only own .410 shotguns and .22 calibre rifles with a license. They also could only own ammunition for those types of firearms with a license; possession of any other type of ammunition, whether the person had a license or not, was illegal.

In the year 2000, House Floor Leader Oscar M. Babauta sponsored a bill that would amend the Weapons Control Act to allow the use of firearms on shooting resorts. Proponents of the bill stated that it would lure investors while detractors of the bill worried it would harm public safety. The House approved the bill on a narrow vote.

=== Radich v. Deleon Guerrero ===
In 2014, David J. Radich, a U.S. Navy Gulf War veteran, and his wife Li-Rong Radich sued James C. Deleon Guerrero, then the commissioner of the Department of Public Safety (DPS), for violating their right to keep and bear arms under the Second Amendment to the United States Constitution. The judge, Ramona V. Manglona, decided the case in favor of the Radiches on March 28, 2016, and decreed that the NMI ban on handguns and ammunition was unconstitutional. The ruling also overturned the ban on importation of handguns and handgun ammunition, the implicit ban on receiving a weapons identification card for self-defense purposes, and the ban on lawful permanent residents obtaining a weapons identification card.

The Parent Teacher Student Association (PTSA) of Tanapag Middle School attempted a motion to intervene on the case's ruling because they believed it would endanger students. Judge Manglona rejected the motion, stating that the older gun control laws had been repealed, thus rendering their motion moot. The Tanapag PTSA took its appeal to the United States Court of Appeals for the Ninth Circuit.

=== Special Act for Firearms and Enforcement (SAFE) ===
In response to the Radich decision, in early April, CNMI Governor Ralph Torres approved gun-control legislation which imposed a $1,000 excise tax on handguns and established certain gun-free zones on the islands. This legislation became known as the Special Act for Firearms and Enforcement, or SAFE Act, N.M.I. Pub. L. 19-42 (April 11, 2016).

=== Murphy v. Deleon Guerrero ===
In a lawsuit, U.S. Army veteran and teacher Paul Murphy challenged the constitutionality of the $1000 excise tax on handguns; the requirement that he obtain a license and register his weapons; the restrictions on how he may store his weapons at home; the ban on large capacity magazines; the ban on rifles in calibers above .223; the ban on "assault weapons"; and the ban on transporting operable firearms.

On September 28, 2016, Judge Manglona ruled the following provisions as unconstitutional:

- $1000 excise tax
- Registration requirement
- Ban on calibers above .223
- Assault weapons ban
- Transportation (and open carry) of operable firearms ban

The following provisions were upheld:

- Licensing requirements
- Firearms storage restrictions
- Large capacity magazines ban

These court rulings are reflected in SAFE II, N.M.I. Pub. L. 19-73 (December 1, 2016), the revised version of the SAFE Act. Open carry of a loaded handgun without a permit in public is allowed as long as areas such as gun free zones are not violated. Concealed carry is banned.

=== Handgun Prohibition Revival Act ===
Following the Radich decision, which invalidated the handgun ban, and Murphy decision, which invalidated additional restrictions, the CNMI legislature passed a symbolic law that expressed their disapproval of the Radich decision. Additionally, the law said that if the Radich decision were to be overturned or otherwise rendered unbinding, the handgun ban is to be reinstated automatically.
