= Gun laws in Washington =

Gun laws in Washington may refer to gun laws in either of two jurisdictions in the United States:

- Gun laws in Washington state
- Gun laws in Washington, D.C.

== See also ==
- Washington (disambiguation)
- Gun law in the United States § Major federal gun laws, enacted by Congress in Washington, D.C.
