= H. R. Locke =

American photographer

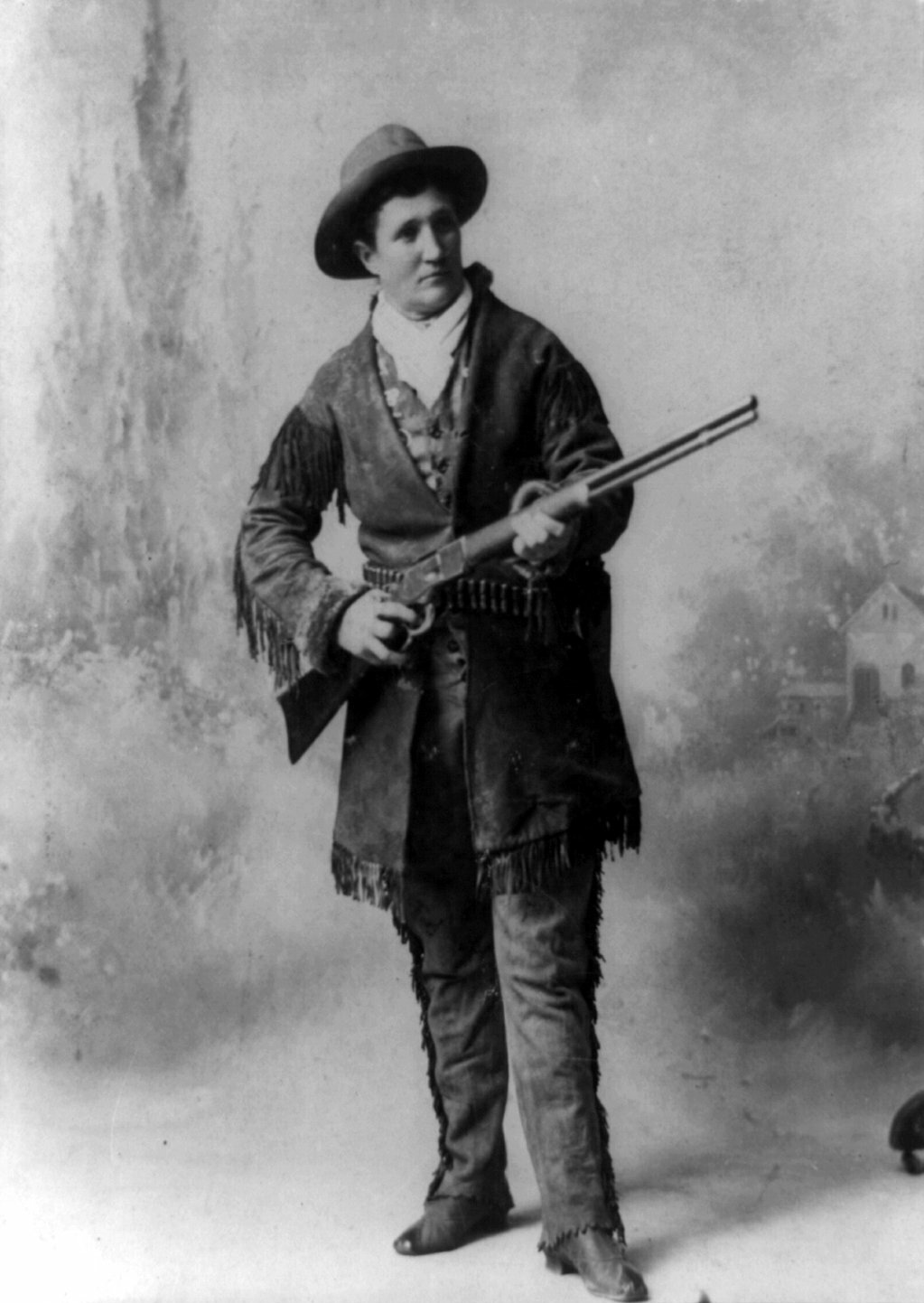
Photo of Calamity Jane

Henry Robinson Locke (1867 – August 22, 1927) was an American photographer in the 19th and 20th century who photographed the Wild West.

He ran a studio in Deadwood, South Dakota. He photographed the Black Hills area, Deadwood, Crow Indians, farmers, miners, railroads, but also Calamity Jane (1885) and the Little Big Horn battlefield (1894).

== Personal life and death ==
Locke was born in Feb 18, 1856 in Shade Gap, Pennsylvania. He died in 1927 in Sheridan, Wyoming.

== Gallery ==
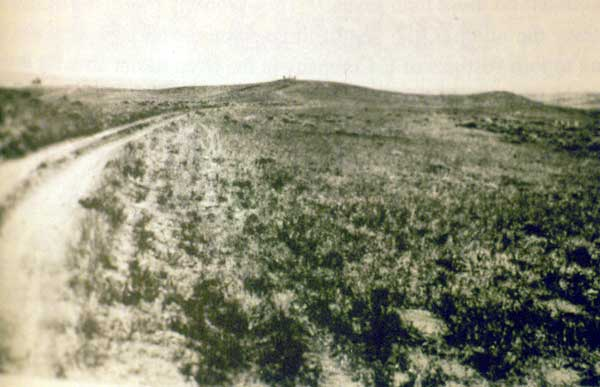
Photo of Little Big Horn battlefield
