= Boyfriend loophole =

Gap in American gun legislation

The boyfriend loophole is a gap in American gun legislation that allows physically abusive ex-romantic partners and stalkers with previous convictions or restraining orders to access guns. While individuals who have been convicted of, or are under a restraining order for, domestic violence are prohibited from owning a firearm, the prohibition only applies if the victim was the perpetrator's spouse or cohabitant, or if the perpetrator had a child with the victim.

The boyfriend loophole was introduced in 1996 with the Lautenberg Amendment, which established stricter gun control restrictions in the United States in order to combat domestic abuse. This law included a definition of an "intimate partner", who would be prohibited from accessing guns, but it did not encompass certain dating partners.

Both before and after the introduction of the boyfriend loophole, there were attempts to increase governmental action in relation to domestic abuse, but they were unsuccessful, on constitutional grounds.

More recently, researchers have found a positive correlation between intimate partner violence and firearm access. Additionally, researchers have studied the overlap between instances of domestic abuse, stalking, and shootings.

Although the boyfriend loophole has a direct effect on people who experience domestic abuse or stalking by former or current intimate partners, women disproportionately face intimate partner violence, and national data indicate that rates of severe intimate partner violence perpetrated against women are much higher than rates of severe intimate partner violence perpetrated against men (18.2% vs. 8.6%), so women are disproportionately impacted by the boyfriend loophole.

Current legislation aimed at combating intimate partner violence includes the Violence Against Women Act, which was reauthorized on March 16, 2022, as well as the Bipartisan Safer Communities Act, which was signed into law on June 25, 2022. This federal legislation significantly narrows the boyfriend loophole, denying access to firearms for five years to people convicted of violence in dating relationships. However, this restriction does not apply to those who only have restraining orders.

== The Lautenberg Amendment ==
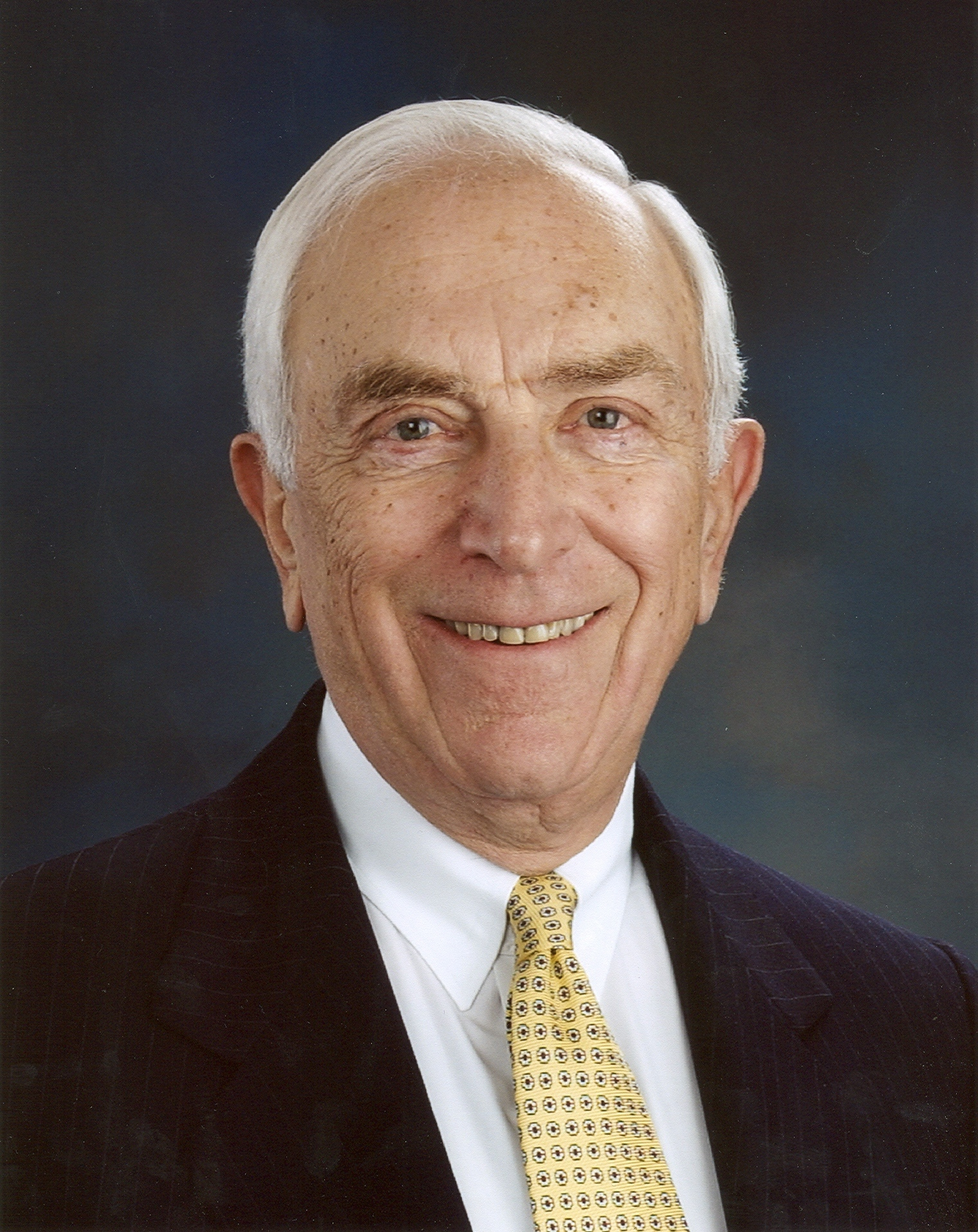
Senator Frank Lautenberg of the United States Congress

The primary gun control legislation in the United States is the Gun Control Act of 1968 (CGA). This is one of the United States federal laws that regulates firearm owners and the firearm industry. This provision, however, did not restrict alleged or convicted domestic violence abusers who continued to purchase guns for self-defense. Therefore, an amendment was introduced in 1996. This amendment is officially called the Gun Ban for Individuals Convicted of a Misdemeanor Crime of Domestic Violence, but it is most commonly referred to as the "Lautenberg Amendment".

The Lautenberg Amendment was proposed by Senator Frank Lautenberg, a Democrat from New Jersey. He had the intention of closing the existing gap in the federal GCA directed towards domestic violence prosecutions, which were usually either charged as misdemeanors or, as a result of plea-bargain agreements, were reduced from felonies to misdemeanors. This law was an amendment to the existing felon-in-possession laws and forbade the possession or commercial sale of a firearm by all convicted domestic violence abusers. This amendment banned those convicted of a misdemeanor crime of domestic violence from shipping, transporting, owning, or using guns. Specifically, it prohibited this firearm access from anyone who used physical force or threatened to use a weapon against "a person with whom the victim shares a child in common…a person who is cohabiting with or has cohabited with the victim as a spouse, parent, or guardian, or…a person similarly situated to a spouse, parent, or guardian of the victim". Therefore, the Lautenberg Amendment did not include restrictions for intimate dating partners. This gap is what created the boyfriend loophole.

In order to help pass the bill, the National Coalition Against Domestic Violence and the National Network to End Domestic Violence gave testimony. Additionally, in his address, Senator Lautenberg said that his bill "stands for the simple proposition that if you beat your wife, you should not have a gun".

On March 21, 1996, the United States Senate voted nearly unanimously and passed the bill as an amendment to help combat domestic violence. President Bill Clinton signed it into law a few months later as a component of a federal omnibus spending bill called the Omnibus Appropriations Act of 1997.

== Constitutional challenges to increase governmental action in response to domestic violence ==
Historically, some believed that domestic violence was a violation of the Fourteenth Amendment's Due Process Clause. However, the Supreme Court rejected such arguments, instead stating that the clause does not impose duty upon states to protect people from injury caused by other private individuals. This position was amplified in 1989 in Deshaney v. Winnebago County Department of Social Services, where the Court held that a "State's failure to protect an individual against private violence simply does not constitute a violation of the Due Process Clause." In the case, the Fourteenth Amendment rights of a 4-year-old child were not held to be violated after the child suffered near-fatal abuse that was alleged to have been partly the fault of the state's child protection agency. The Court held that the Constitution does not impose an obligation for the government to provide help, "even when such aid may be necessary to secure life, liberty, or property interests of which government itself may not deprive the individual".

This argument eventually developed to encompass the category of intimate partner violence in the 2005 case of Town of Castle Rock v. Gonzales, when Jessica Gonzales’s allegedly abusive husband violated his temporary restraining order and kidnapped their children. Ms. Gonzales had called the police several times during the day to report the missing children, and she had visited the police station to report the matter in person, but the Castle Rock Police Department did not take action. Her husband later arrived at the Castle Rock police station and was killed in a shootout with the officers. Subsequently, Ms. Gonzales's children were found dead in Mr. Gonzales's truck. Ms. Gonzales sued the town of Castle Rock for violating her right to substantive and procedural due process, but based on precedent established in Deshaney v. Winnebago County Department of Social Services, the Supreme Court found that no constitutional responsibility was imposed by the Fourteenth Amendment’s procedural Due Process Clause. Hence, the Court held that the Colorado officials’ actions did not violate Ms. Gonzales’ constitutional rights.

Both rulings in Deshaney v. Winnebago County Department of Social Services and Town of Castle Rock v. Gonzales declared that constitutionally enshrined individual rights, such as the right to due process, do not protect an individual from the government's inaction in response to abusers' harm. Therefore, the police's nonintervention in response to calls of domestic violence, or intimate partner violence, is not a violation of the Fourteenth Amendment.

This being the case, the police or government's inaction in response to intimate dating partner abuse involving firearms is constitutional. Hence, some believe that it is important to implement laws that prevent those who perpetrate intimate partner violence – including dating partners – from obtaining weapons, since there is no guarantee that victims will otherwise have government protection.

== Research on intimate partner violence and firearm access ==
There is a connection between intimate partner violence and firearm use for both dating partners and spouses. There is not a significant difference between the number of murders caused by dating partners and by spouses. For instance, in 1980, murders caused by dating partners almost equaled spousal homicides. Moreover, according to data released in 2018, this continues to be the case.

Additionally, reports published by The United States Department of Justice showed that firearms were involved in over two-thirds of ex-spouse homicide incidents over the period 1980 to 2008. Moreover, in a panel study conducted from 1991 to 2015, researchers considered whether there was a relationship between state intimate partner violence-related firearm prohibitions and rates of intimate partner homicide in the United States. They found that states with laws that restricted people with intimate partner violence-related restraining orders from obtaining firearms experienced lower intimate partner homicide rates, and specifically lower rates of intimate partner homicide from firearms. However, this was only the case in states that required those with intimate partner violence-related restraining orders to surrender their firearms. Furthermore, the National Institutes of Health conducted a study in 2003 which found that a perpetrator's access to a gun led to a significant increase in risk of intimate partner violence.

Moreover, the Preventative Medicine journal published research on whether intimate partner violence differs based on the type of relationship (spouse or significant other) and relationship status (current partner or former partner). By studying cases of intimate partner violence that occurred in Philadelphia in 2013, researchers found that more than 80% of over 30,000 cases of intimate partner violence involved non-marital intimate partner relationships. In fact, compared to current spouses, current unmarried significant others were found to be most likely to exhibit violent behavior, although they were no more or less likely to use guns in those acts of violence than were spouses. Therefore, the researchers determined that unmarried partners posed an equal or greater risk of intimate partner violence, compared to married partners.

Furthermore, the American Journal of Epidemiology published research on whether the strength of policies prohibiting domestic violence offenders from obtaining firearms is associated with intimate partner homicides. The researchers found that the strength of these protections are significant only when they apply to current and former dating partners, rather than only current and former spouses.

=== Connection between domestic abuse, stalking, and shootings ===
There are studies that show a connection between threats and stalking among partner abuse victims. The National Domestic violence hotline recorded data showing more than one in three callers report being threatened with a gun by their abuser, and more than three-quarters of domestic violence victims included in the study report being stalked by their ex-partner.

Additionally, Everytown for Gun Safety conducted an analysis of mass shootings in the United States from 2009 to 2020. The data showed that in at least 53% of mass shootings, the perpetrator shot a current or former intimate partner or family member. In fact, Everytown for Gun Safety reported that domestic-violence related mass shootings account for nearly half of mass shooting deaths in the United States.

== Gender and the boyfriend loophole ==
Despite its name, the loophole is not gender-specific. However, according to research conducted by advocacy group Everytown for Gun Safety, intimate partner violence disproportionately impacts women. Moreover, women of color are disproportionately affected by intimate partner violence perpetuated specifically by men. However, rates of female-perpetrated violence are in fact higher than male-perpetrated (28.3% vs. 21.6%).

== The Violence Against Women Act ==
In 1994, two years before the introduction of the boyfriend loophole, the Violence Against Women Act (VAWA) was signed into law by President Bill Clinton. VAWA provides funding for federal investigation and prosecution of domestic violence, and incentivizes states to require the mandatory arrest of abusers. VAWA was reauthorized in 2000, 2005, and 2013, and each reauthorization strengthened its protections. However, in 2018, VAWA lapsed under President Donald Trump.

During his candidacy, President Trump was endorsed by the National Rifle Association (NRA), which is the oldest firearm advocacy group in the United States. According to NRA spokeswoman Jennifer Baker, VAWA is "too broad and ripe for abuse". During the 2019 proceedings when Democrats tried to reintroduce VAWA, the NRA issued an alert to members of Congress against its reauthorization. While the Democratic House of Representatives reauthorized VAWA, the Republican-controlled Senate did not allow it to pass because they had concerns about the provision that would make it more difficult to obtain a firearm for people convicted of a violent crime or subject to a restraining order.

In 2022, there was a Democrat-led movement to close the boyfriend loophole in the reauthorization of VAWA under President Joe Biden. However, according to the NRA, the boyfriend loophole is simply an attempt to increase gun control by Democrats. Hence, Republicans would not agree to passing VAWA if the boyfriend loophole was closed, since they did not want to narrow access to guns. In order to reauthorize VAWA, Democrats limited the scope of the bill.

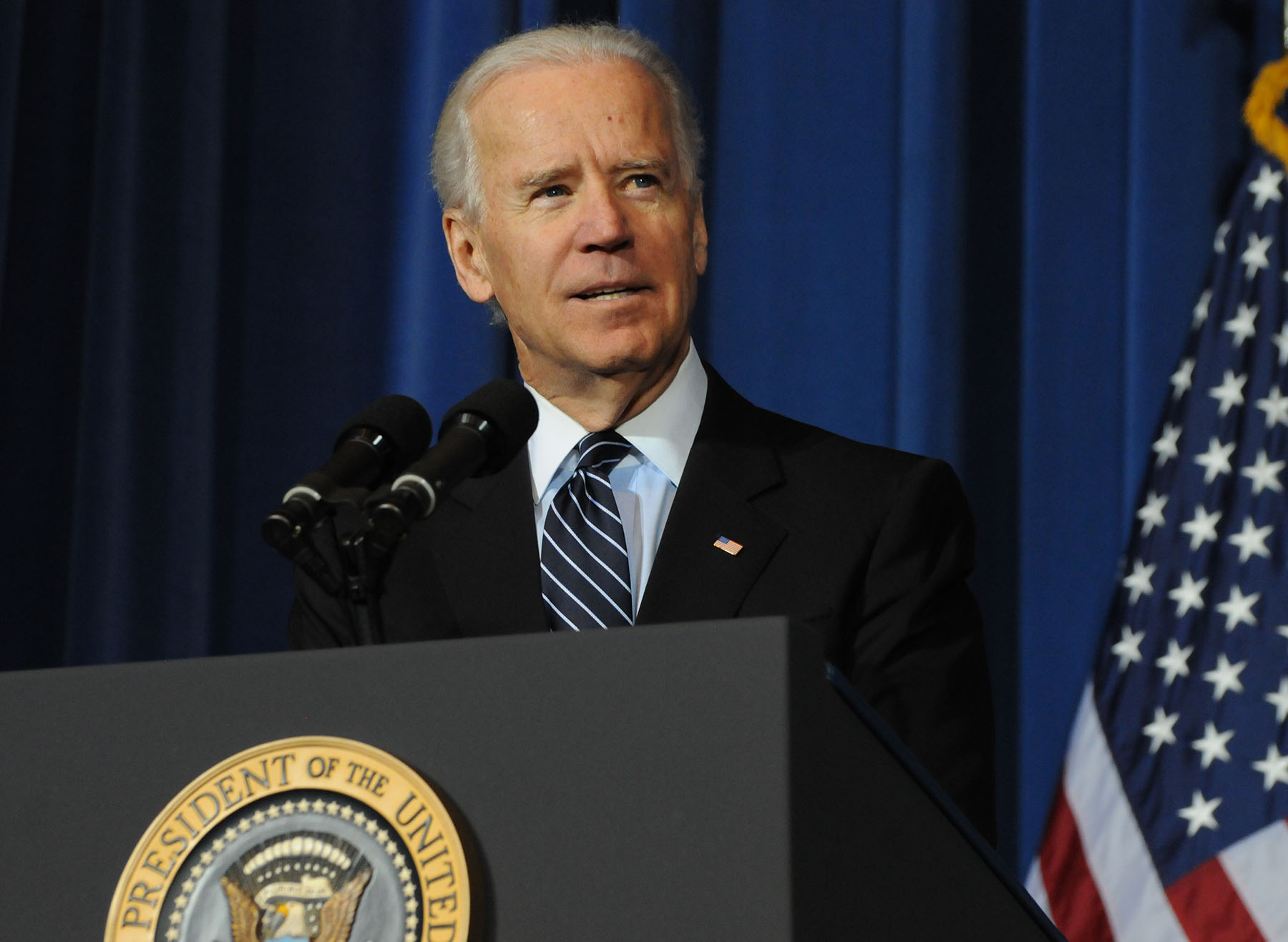
President Joe Biden speaks after signing the Violence Against Women Reauthorization Act of 2022 on March 16, 2022.

The United States House of Representatives passed the Violence Against Women Act Reauthorization Act of 2022, which President Joe Biden subsequently signed into law. This reauthorization limited the proposals made by some Democratic politicians to help close the boyfriend loophole. However, this specific Act not only reauthorized previous programs from earlier versions of VAWA, but it also increased services for marginalized groups, such as LGBTQ+ survivors of intimate partner violence, and created the National Instant Criminal Background Check System Denial Notification Act, which was intended to help law enforcement officers investigate those who try to purchase a firearm when they are prohibited from doing so.

== Current legislation and new federal restrictions ==
The Zero Tolerance for Domestic Abuse Act was introduced to Congress on January 15, 2019. The stated aim of the bill was to define the term "intimate partner" to include dating partners and other people for whom state domestic violence laws or family law is obligated to provide protection. This bill would partially close the boyfriend loophole, but it has not yet passed.

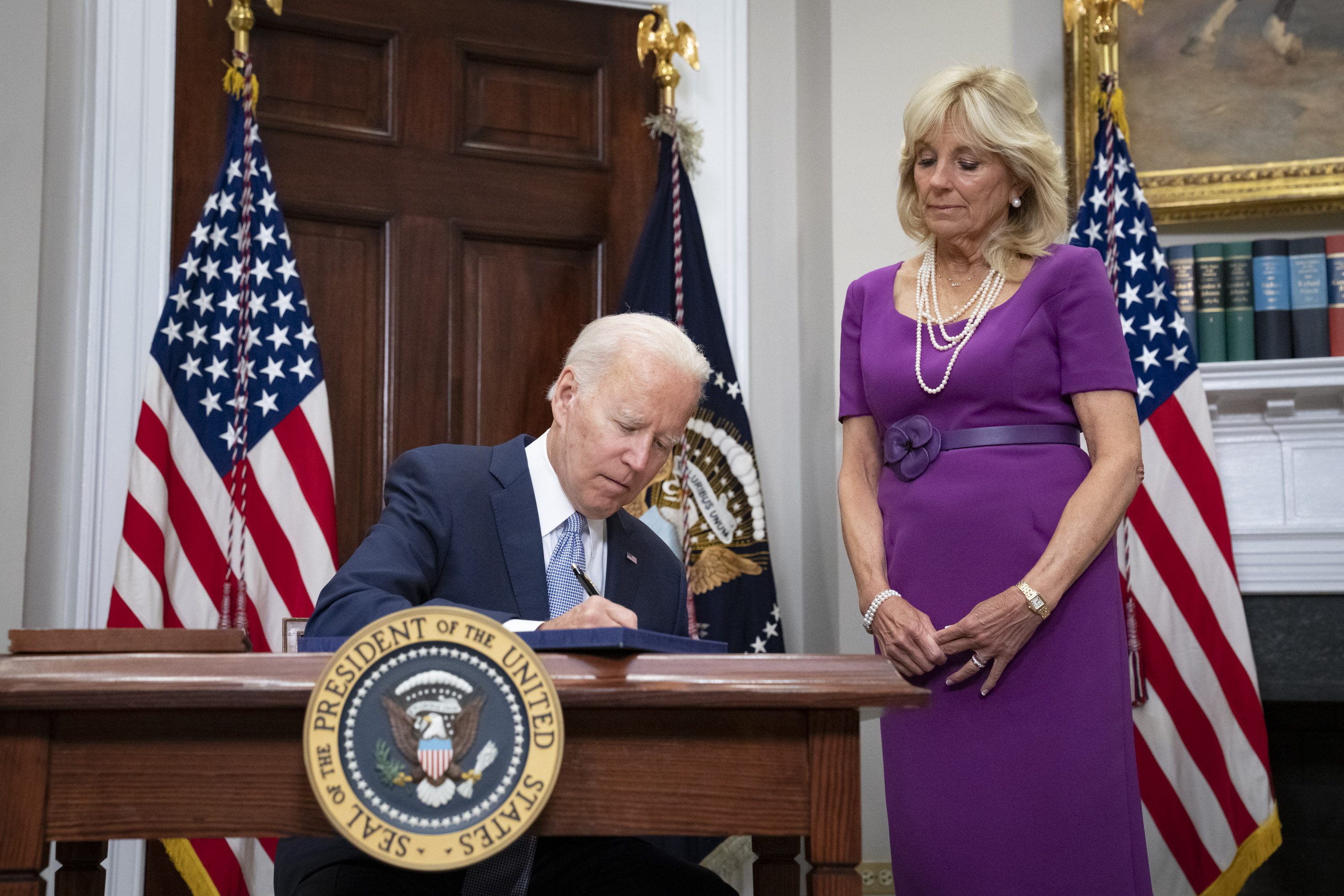
President Joe Biden signs the Bipartisan Safer Communities Act on June 25, 2022.

Additionally, S. 2938, the Bipartisan Safer Communities Act, was passed by Congress and signed into law by President Biden in June 2022. It passed the Senate in a 65–33 vote with 15 Republican senators joining all 50 Democrats in support for the bill and was approved by the House of Representatives in a 234–193 vote with 14 House Republicans joining all 220 Democrats. The Act has significantly narrowed, but not completely closed, the boyfriend loophole. Under the new law, someone convicted of a violent crime against someone with whom they currently are, or previously were, in a dating relationship, is barred from having firearms. The length, nature, and types of interactions of the relationship are used to determine whether it is a dating relationship for the purposes of the Act. The wider provisions, however, expire after five years and never extend to dating partners subject to a restraining order but not convicted of a violent crime.

== See also ==
- Gun Control Act
- Violence Against Women Act § Reauthorizations
