= Domestic Violence Offender Gun Ban =

US federal law

The Domestic Violence Offender Gun Ban, often called the "Lautenberg Amendment" ("Gun Ban for Individuals Convicted of a Misdemeanor Crime of Domestic Violence", Pub. L. 104–208 (text) (PDF), 18 U.S.C. § 922(g)(9)), is an amendment to the Omnibus Consolidated Appropriations Act of 1997, enacted by the 104th United States Congress in 1996, which bans access to firearms for life by people convicted of crimes of domestic violence. The act is often referred to as "the Lautenberg Amendment" after its sponsor, Senator Frank Lautenberg (D-NJ). Lautenberg proposed the amendment after a decision from the United States Court of Appeals for the Ninth Circuit, involving underenforcement of domestic violence laws brought under the Equal Protection Clause of the Fourteenth Amendment to the United States Constitution. President Bill Clinton signed the law as part of the Omnibus Appropriations Act of 1997.

== Summary ==
The act bans shipment, transport, possession, ownership, and use of guns or ammunition by individuals convicted of misdemeanor crime of domestic violence. The 1968 Gun Control Act and subsequent amendments had previously prohibited anyone convicted of a felony and anyone subject to a domestic violence protective order from possessing a firearm. The act also makes it unlawful to knowingly sell or give a firearm or ammunition to such persons.

The definition of 'convicted' can be found in 18 U.S.C. § 921(a)(33)(B)(i) and has exceptions:

(i) A person shall not be considered to have been convicted of such an offense for purposes of this chapter, unless—

(I) the person was represented by counsel in the case, or knowingly and intelligently waived the right to counsel in the case; and
(II) in the case of a prosecution for an offense described in this paragraph for which a person was entitled to a jury trial in the jurisdiction in which the case was tried, either

(aa) the case was tried by a jury, or
(bb) the person knowingly and intelligently waived the right to have the case tried by a jury, by guilty plea or otherwise.

(ii) A person shall not be considered to have been convicted of such an offense for purposes of this chapter if the conviction has been expunged or set aside, or is an offense for which the person has been pardoned or has had civil rights restored (if the law of the applicable jurisdiction provides for the loss of civil rights under such an offense) unless the pardon, expungement, or restoration of civil rights expressly provides that the person may not ship, transport, possess, or receive firearms.

== Restraining order restrictions (preceded the Lautenberg Amendment) ==
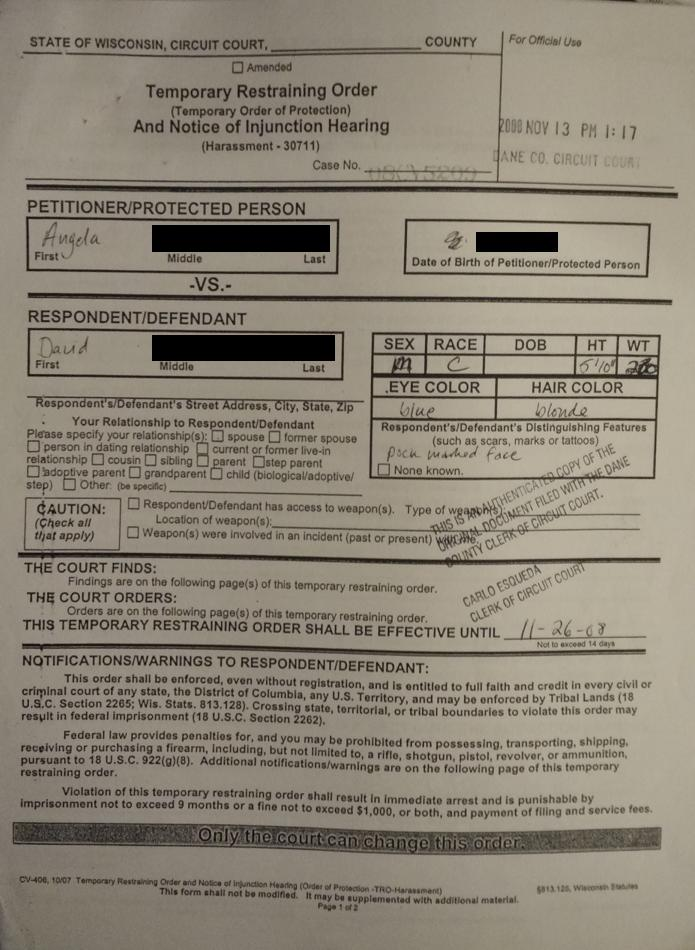
Restraining order noting the potential firearms ban

The Violence Against Women Act of 1994 included a provision restricting respondents to final protective orders from possessing, receiving, transporting, or shipping firearms or ammunition. For restrictions arising from a restraining order there are several requirements before the restrictions apply as follows:

Hearing—the defendant must have had the opportunity to be heard at a hearing
Intimate Partner—the defendant and petitioner must be intimate partners
Restrains Future Contact—must restrain the defendant from harassing, stalking, or threatening behavior
Credible Threat or Physical Force—defendant must be deemed a credible threat to the petitioner or be barred from the use of physical force

The hearing requirement ensures that the firearms restrictions will not apply after an initial ex parte hearing during which a temporary order is granted, but only after a longer term order is granted following a hearing in which both parties have the opportunity to be heard. The intimate partner requirement says that the relationship must be both sexual and involve cohabitation or a child in common. A Brady indicator trigger is generated when the requirements apply, resulting in the restraining order being noted in a federal database as prohibiting the possession of firearms. However, the state forms used for restraining orders do not always clearly indicate whether the specific federal criteria apply, making it difficult to determine whether the firearms restriction applies without a detailed reading of the order, the petition, and other court records.

== Court history ==
This law has been tested but supported in federal court with the case United States v. Emerson (No. 99-10331) (5th Cir. 2001). See also U.S. v. Emerson, 231 Fed. Appx. 349 (5th Cir. 2007) (Same defendant seeking review of judgment). The case involved a challenge to the Constitutionality of 18 U.S.C. § 922(g)(8)(C)(ii), a federal statute that prohibited the transportation of firearms or ammunition in interstate commerce by persons subject to a court order that, by its explicit terms, prohibits the use of physical force against an intimate partner or child. Emerson does not address the portion of the Lautenberg Amendment involving conviction for misdemeanor domestic violence. It was initially overturned in 1999 for being unconstitutional, but that case was reversed upon appeal in 2001.

The case Gillespie v. City of Indianapolis, Indiana, 185 F.3d 693 (7th Cir. 1999) also challenged this law, and the case was rejected. The ex post facto aspects of the law were challenged with:

- United States v. Brady, 26 F.3d 282 (2nd Cir.), cert. denied, 115 S.Ct. 246 (1994) (denying ex post facto challenge to a 922(g)(1) conviction) and
- United States v. Waters, 23 F.3d 29 (2nd Cir. 1994) (ex post facto based challenge to a 922(g)(4) conviction).

Both of the challenges were denied.

Likewise this law was invoked in United States v. Jardee where it was ruled that the threat of being subjected to the gun ban did not turn an otherwise "petty" crime into a "serious" one requiring a jury trial.

In United States vs Chovan (2013), the United States Court of Appeals for the Ninth Circuit ruled that the Lautenberg amendment is constitutional. Chovan claimed that his civil rights had been restored due to California law, but according to federal law, his rights had never been restored. The court also stated that a person cannot have their civil rights restored if they were never taken away in the first place since the Lautenberg amendment does not take away a person’s right to vote or be on a jury.

In United States v. Hayes (2009), the Supreme Court held that the predicate offense does not need to include a domestic relationship as an element, so long as a domestic relationship did in fact exist between the perpetrator and the victim. United States v. Castleman (2014) challenged the application of the law to misdemeanor convictions which did not involve "the use or attempted use of physical force". In a 9–0 decision, the United States Supreme Court held that Castleman's conviction of "misdemeanor domestic assault" did qualify as a "misdemeanor crime of domestic violence" under Tennessee state law. Specifically holding that the ""physical force" requirement is satisfied by the degree of force that supports a common-law battery conviction — namely, offensive touching", thereby preventing him from possession of firearms. Most recently, the Supreme Court in Voisine v. United States, 579 U.S. 686 (2016), decided that the Domestic Violence Offender Gun Ban in U.S. federal law extends to those convicted of reckless domestic violence.

In 2022 President Joe Biden signed into effect the Bipartisan Safer Communities Act. It narrowed the boyfriend loophole because it makes the Lautenberg Amendment apply to people in a significant dating relationship.

== See also ==
- Boyfriend loophole
- Firearm Owners Protection Act
- Gun Control Act
