= Warren v. District of Columbia =

Court of Appeals case on police services

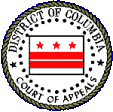
- Seal of the District of Columbia Court of Appeals
- Court: District of Columbia Court of Appeals
- Full case name: Carolyn WARREN, et al., Appellants, v. DISTRICT OF COLUMBIA, et al., Appellees. Wilfred NICHOL, Appellant, v. DISTRICT OF COLUMBIA METROPOLITAN POLICE DEPARTMENT, et al., Appellees.
- Decided: December 21, 1981
- Citation: 444 A.2d. 1, D.C. Ct. of Ap. 1981

Warren v. District of Columbia (444 A.2d. 1, D.C. Ct. of Ap. 1981) is a District of Columbia Court of Appeals case that held that the police are not under a specific legal duty to provide police services to individual citizens based on the public duty doctrine.

The court's decision, written by Judge Joseph M. Hannon, plainly stated that "a government and its agents are under no general duty to provide public services, such as police protection, to any particular individual citizen."

== Procedural history ==
Carolyn Warren, Miriam Douglas, Joan Taliaferro, and, in a separate case, Wilfred Nichol sued the District of Columbia and individual members of the Metropolitan Police Department for negligent failure to provide adequate police services. The trial judges held that the police were under no specific legal duty to provide protection to the individual plaintiffs and dismissed the complaints. In a 2–1 decision, the District of Columbia Court of Appeals determined that Warren, Taliaferro, and Nichol were owed a special duty of care by the police department and reversed the trial court rulings. In a unanimous decision, the court also held that Douglas failed to fit within the class of persons to whom a special duty was owed and affirmed the trial court's dismissal of her complaint. The case was reheard by an en banc panel of the District of Columbia Court of Appeals, and the defendant (District of Columbia) prevailed.

== Background ==
=== Warren, Taliaferro, and Douglas ===
In the early morning hours of March 16, 1975, appellants Carolyn Warren, Joan Taliaferro, and Miriam Douglas were asleep in their rooming house at 1112 Lamont Street, N.W. Warren and Taliaferro shared a room on the third floor of the house; Douglas shared a room on the second floor with her four-year-old daughter. The women were awakened by the sound of the back door being broken down by two men later identified as Marvin Kent and James Morse. The men entered Douglas' second floor room, where Kent forced Douglas to sodomize him and Morse raped her.

Warren and Taliaferro heard Douglas' screams from the floor below. Warren telephoned the police, told the officer on duty that the house was being burglarized, and requested immediate assistance. The department employee told her to remain quiet and assured her that police assistance would be dispatched promptly. Warren's call was received at Metropolitan Police Department Headquarters at 6:23 a. m., and was recorded as a burglary in progress. At 6:26 a. m., a call was dispatched to officers on the street as a "Code 2" assignment, although calls of a crime in progress should be given priority and designated as "Code 1." Four police cruisers responded to the broadcast; three to the Lamont Street address and one to another address to investigate a possible suspect.

Meanwhile, Warren and Taliaferro crawled from their window onto an adjoining roof and waited for the police to arrive. While there, they saw one policeman drive through the alley behind their house and proceed to the front of the residence without stopping, leaning out the window, or getting out of the car to check the back entrance of the house. A second officer apparently knocked on the door in front of the residence, but left when he received no answer. The three officers departed the scene at 6:33 a. m., five minutes after they arrived.

Warren and Taliaferro crawled back inside their room. They again heard Douglas' continuing screams; again called the police; told the officer that the intruders had entered the home, and requested immediate assistance. Once again, a police officer assured them that help was on the way. This second call was received at 6:42 a. m. and recorded merely as "investigate the trouble"—it was never dispatched to any police officers.

Believing the police might be in the house, Warren and Taliaferro called down to Douglas, thereby alerting Kent to their presence. Kent and Morse then forced all three women, at knifepoint, to accompany them to Kent's apartment. For the next fourteen hours the women were held captive, raped, robbed, beaten, forced to commit sexual acts upon each other, and made to submit to the sexual demands of Kent and Morse.

Appellants' claims of negligence included: the dispatcher's failure to forward the 6:23 a. m. call with the proper degree of urgency; […]the responding officers' failure to follow standard police investigative procedures, specifically their failure to check the rear entrance and position themselves properly near the doors and windows to ascertain whether there was any activity inside; and the dispatcher's failure to dispatch the 6:42 a. m. call.

—

=== Nichol ===
On April 30, 1978, at approximately 11:30 pm, appellant Nichol stopped his car for a red light at the intersection of Missouri Avenue and Sixteenth Street, N.W. Unknown occupants in a vehicle directly behind appellant struck his car in the rear several times, and then proceeded to beat appellant about the face and head, breaking his jaw.

A Metropolitan Police Department officer arrived at the scene. In response to the officer's direction, appellant's companion ceased any further efforts to obtain identification information of the assailants. When the officer then failed to get the information, leaving Nichol unable to institute legal action against his assailants, Nichol brought a negligence action against the officer, the Metropolitan Police Department and the District of Columbia.

== Decision ==
In a 4–3 decision, the District of Columbia Court of Appeals affirmed the trial courts' dismissal of the complaints against the District of Columbia and individual members of the Metropolitan Police Department based on the public duty doctrine ruling that "the duty to provide public services is owed to the public at large, and, absent a special relationship between the police and an individual, no specific legal duty exists". The Court thus adopted the trial court's determination that no special relationship existed between the police and appellants, and therefore no specific legal duty existed between the police and the appellants.

== See also ==
- Lozito v. New York City
- DeShaney v. Winnebago County
- Town of Castle Rock v. Gonzales
- Duty of care
- United States tort law
- Refusing to assist a police officer
