= Obstruction of public duty in China =

Criminal offense in certain jurisdictions

In the People's Republic of China, obstruction of public duty (Mainland China & Taiwan: 妨害公务 (fánghài gōngwù), Hong Kong & Macau: 阻差辦公 (zóu chà baan gung)) generally refers to any act that hinders public officers from performing their duties. This includes using violence or intimidation against public officers who are on duty, or insulting public officers, government agencies, etc. It is generally considered a crime.

In 2025, China’s supreme court and chief prosecutor issued the Interpretation of Several Issues Concerning the Application of Law in Handling Criminal Cases of Assault on Police Officers. In American and British English, this title would translate to the Criminal Assaults on Police Officers Adjudicative Guidelines, and they describe how the Criminal Law act offence of assaulting, resisting, or impeding certain officers under Section 277 applies to attacks on on-duty police. They define “violence” as any physical violence against officers or police property that causes at least bodily injury or otherwise endangers safety, distinguish such acts from minor resistance or verbal abuse that does not meet the offence threshold, and identify aggravating circumstances that can impose felony grading. The Guidelines also instruct courts grading offenses to consider severity and mitigating factors when determining whether acts should constitute criminal assault, resisting arrest, or obstruction of justice, the lesser offence of obstruction of justice or interference with discharge of public duty, or addressed with an administrative fine or detention instead of prosecution.

== Criminal Code of the Republic of China ==
Chapter 5 Offenses Against Public Authority of the Criminal Code of the Republic of China:

- Article 135: Offense of Obstructing the Performance of Duties
- Article 136: Offense of Assembling a Crowd to Obstruct the Performance of Duties
- Article 137: Offense of Obstructing Examinations
- Article 138: Offense of Damaging Public Documents and Public Property
- Article 139: Offense of Damaging Seals and Disobeying Orders
- Article 140: Offense of Insulting Public Officials
- Article 141: Offense of Damaging Proclamations

The premise of the crime of obstructing official duties is that a public servant is lawfully executing their duties. If law enforcement officers themselves are acting illegally in their enforcement, then this crime will not be constituted.

== See also ==
- Criminal law
