= List of crimes in the Criminal Code of the Republic of China =

Below are the crimes mentioned in the Specific Offences Part of the Criminal Code of the Republic of China, translations are cited from Ministry of Justice, Republic of China

Bolded terms indicated are the common offences.

== Offenses against the state ==
=== Offenses of civil disturbance, treason and diplomacy ===
- Civil Disturbance（Article 100-102）
- Treason
- Collusion with enemy by waging war
- Loss of territory by collusion with enemy
- Serving in enemy forces
- Collusion with enemy
- Disclosing secrets of national defense
- Spying
- Secret agreement with foreign government（Article 113）
- Interference against diplomacy
- Desecration of foreign flag and emblem (Article 118)

=== Offenses of Malfeasance in Office ===
- Abandoning territory
- **Bribery**
  - Bribery under official acts（Article 121）
  - Bribery under breaching official acts（Article 122）
  - Bribery of non-public official（Article 123）
- Unjust judgement
- Abusive prosecution
- Forced confession
- Unlawful punishment
- Unauthorised suit
- Catastrophe by neglence of office
- **Illegal benefits from supervisiom**（Article 131）
- Disclosing public office secrets（Article 132）
- Disclosing secrets by postal personnel
- Miscellaneous malfeasance（Article 134）

=== Offenses against public office ===
- **Violence against public officer**（Article 135）
- Organised violence against public officer
- Obstruction against examination
- Vandalizing public document
- Contaminating a seal
- **Contempt of cop**（Article 140）
- ~~**Contempt of public office**~~（Repealed in 2022）
- Vandalizing public proclamation

=== Contempt of Congress ===
- ~~Falsifying statement of public officers in Legislature~~(Article 141-1, declared unconstitutional)

=== Offenses against voting ===
- Interfering voting freedom
- Vote by bribery
- Vote to bribe
- Interfering voting results
- Interfering voting order
- Interfering voting secrecy

=== Offenses against public order ===
- Unauthorised assembly
- Unauthorised assembly by violence
- Obstruct lawful assembly
- **Intimidation against public**（Article 151）
- Inciting another to commit an offense（Article 153）
- Participation in organized crime（Article 154）
- Mecenary
- Contracted lawsuit
- Desecration of flag, emblem and portrait of founding father（Article 160）

=== Offenses against judiciary ===
- Escape from judicial custody
- Concealment of offenders
- **Concealment of criminal evidences**（Article 165）
- **Perjury**（Article 168）
- **Calumny**（Article 169）
  - Undesignated Calumny（Article 171）

Offenses against judiciary justice

- Bribery to witness
- Obstruct judicial testification
- Obstruct judicial decision to judge and prosecutors

== Offences against society ==
=== Offenses against public safety ===
- **Arson**
  - against occupied dwelling house （Article 173）
  - against unoccupied dwelling house（Article 174）
  - against other structures（Article 175）
  - arson by neglience（Article 176）
- Flooding
- Damage by flooding
- Obstruct disaster relief
- Damage public transport
- Interfering traffic order
- Interfering public traffic
- Hijacking
- Endangering aviation safety
- **Dangerous driving**（Article 185-3）
- **Hit and run**（Article 185-4）
- Obstruct public business
- Obstruct escape route
- Contaminating drinking water
- **Poisoning**（Article 190-1）
- Violation of construction standards

=== Offenses of currency ===
- **Using counterfeit currency**
- Using counterfeit securities
- Counterfeit of measurements

=== Offenses of documents ===
- **Falsification of private documents**（Article 210）
- **Falsification of public documents**（Article 211）
- Falsification of specific documents（Article 212）
- **Falsification record by public officer**（Article 213）
- **Causing falsification record by public officer**（Article 214）
- Falsification of official records（Article 215）
- Using falsified documents（Article 216）
- Falsification of stamps（Article 217）
- Falsification of official stamps（Article 218）

=== Offenses against decency ===
- Incest（Article 230）
- **Outrage public decency**（Article 234）
- **Disseminate articles outrage public decency**（Article 235）

=== Offenses against marriage and family ===
- Bigamy（Article 237）
- Marriage by fraudulent means（Article 238）
- ~~**Adultery**~~（Article 239, declared unconstitutional by No.791 Interpretation, repealed in 2021）

=== Offenses of religious activities and graveyard ===
- Vandalizing religious venue
- Insulting the remains of deceased
- Interfering religious function
- Grave robbery

=== Offenses against agriculture, industry and commerce ===
- Stocking and raising prices
- Interfering agricultural water supplies
- Falsifying business trademarks

=== Offenses of opium ===
- Manufacturing narcotics
- Trafficking narcotics
- Manufacture instrument for narcotics
- Dosing narcotics by benefits
- Operate narcotics dosing venue
- Opium plantation
- Consuming narcotics
- Possess narcotics

=== Gambling offenses ===
- **Gambling**（Article 266）
- Gambling business
- Providing gambling venue for benefits
- Gambling by organised benefits

== Offences against personal rights ==
=== Offenses of murder ===
- **Murder**（Article 271）
- **Parricide**（Article 272）
- Kill by anger（Article 273）
- Murder of infant（Article 274）
- **Assisted suicide**（Article 275）
- **Negligent homicide**（Article 276）
  - **~~Negligent homicide~~ ~~by official acts~~**（Repealed in 2019）

=== Offenses causing injury ===
- **Injury**（Article 277）
- **Aggravated Injury**（Article 278）
- Injury by anger（Article 279）
- Injuring senior family members（Article 280）
- Injuring senior family members by violence（Article 281）
- Assisted self-injury（Article 282）
- **Organised fighting**（Article 283）
- **Negligent injury**（Article 284）
  - ~~Neglient injury by official acts~~（Repealed in 2019）
- ~~Spreading venereal diseases~~（Article 285，Repeal in 2019）
- Maltreat of growth development（Article 286）

=== Offenses of abortion ===
- Abortion
- Assisted Abortion
- Assisted Abortion by benefit
- Unconsented abortion
- Introduction of abortion services

=== Offenses of abandonment ===
- Non-obligation abandonment（Article 293）
- **Obligation abandonment**（Article 294）
- Abandonment of direct relatives（Article 295）

=== Sexual offenses ===
- **Rape**（Article 221）
  - Aggravated rape（Article 222）
- **Indecent assault**（Article 224）
  - Aggravated indecent assault（Article 224-1）
- Indecent assault by advantage（Article 225）
- **Abusing a child**（Article 227、227-1）
- **Rape and indecent assault by authority**（Article 228）
- Rape by fraudulent means（Article 229）

=== Offenses against freedom ===
- Slavery（Article 296）
- Human Trafficking（Article 296-1）
- Abduction of female（Article 298）
- **False imprisonment**（Article 302）
- **Threatening of personal rights**（Article 304）
- Intimidation against safety（Article 305）
- **Intrusion of dwelling place**（Article 306）
- Unlawful search（Article 307）

=== Offenses against reputation and credit ===
- **Public Insultation**（Article 309）
- **Libel**（Article 310）
- Insulting a deceased（Article 312）
- Damaging credibility of persons（Article 313）

=== Offenses against secrecy ===
- Unauthorised revealing documents（Article 315）
- **Unauthorised recording**（Article 315-1）
- Leaking official secrets（Article 316）
- Leaking computer secrets（Article 318-1）

=== Offenses against sexual privacy ===
- Unauthorised sexual recording（Article 319-1）
- Forcing sexual recording（Article 319-2）
- Disseminate sexual recording（Article 319-3）
- Disseminate falsified sexual recording（Article 319-4）

=== Offenses against computer use ===
- Theft
  - Theft（Article 320）
  - Aggravated theft（Article 321）
- **Abrupt taking and piracy**
  - **Abrupt taking**（Article 325）
  - **Robbery**（Article 328）
  - Miscellaneous abrupt taking（Article 329）
  - Organised Abrupt taking（Article 332）
  - **Piracy**（Article 333）
  - Organised piracy（Article 334）
- **Embezzlement**
  - Embezzlement（Article 335）
  - Official embezzlement（Article 336）
  - Embezzlement of lost articles（Article 337）
- Fraudulent
  - **Fraudulent**（Article 339）
  - **Fraudulent by payment devices**（Article 339-1）
  - **Fraudulent by automatic payment devices**（Article 339-2）
  - **Fraudulent by computer**（Article 339-3）
  - **Aggravated fraudulent**（Article 339-4）
  - **Harm of interest**（Article 342）
  - Loan Shark（Article 344）
- Extortion and Kidnapping
  - **Extortion**（Article 346）
  - **Kidnapping**（Article 347）
- **Receiving stolen property**（Article 349～351）
- **Property damage**
  - Damage of documents（Article 352）
  - Damage of buildings（Article 353）
  - Damage of belongings of others（Article 354）
  - Damage of property by fraud（Article 355）
  - Damage of civil law obligation（Article 356）

=== Misuse of computers ===
- Unauthorised access（Article 358）
- **Altering computer records**（Article 359）
- Hacking（Article 360）
- Manufacture hacking program（Article 362）
