= Town of Castle Rock, Colorado v. Gonzales =

- Supreme Court of the United States

Argued March 21, 2005 Decided June 27, 2005
- Full case name: Town of Castle Rock, Colorado, Petitioner v. Jessica Gonzales, individually and as next of kin of her deceased minor children, Rebecca Gonzales, Katheryn Gonzales, and Leslie Gonzales
- Docket no.: 04-278
- Citations: 545 U.S. 748 (more) 125 S. Ct. 2796; 162 L. Ed. 2d 658; 18 Fla. L. Weekly Fed. S 511
- Argument: Oral argument

Case history
- Prior: Gonzales v. City of Castle Rock, 307 F.3d 1258 (10th Cir. 2002).; On rehearing en banc, 366 F.3d 1093 (10th Cir. 2004).; Cert. granted, 543 U.S. 955 (2004).
- Subsequent: Gonzales v. City of Castle Rock, 144 F. App'x 746 (10th Cir. 2005).

Questions presented
- 1. Whether, in conflict with decisions of the Sixth, Seventh, Eighth, and D.C. Circuits, the Tenth Circuit's decision permitting a procedural due process claim against a local government for its failure to protect the holder of a partial restraining order from private violence, when the State itself provides no such remedy, so circumvents as to effectively repudiate this Court's holding in DeShaney rejecting a similar substantive due process claim?; 2. If the Fourteenth Amendment's Due Process Clause is read to permit, via its procedural aspects, the same substantive claims already rejected by this Court in DeShaney, what kind of process is required for police inaction with respect to a partial restraining order not to violate the constitution?

Holding
- Respondent did not, for Due Process Clause purposes, have a property interest in police enforcement of the restraining order against her husband.

Court membership
- Chief Justice William Rehnquist Associate Justices John P. Stevens · Sandra Day O'Connor; Antonin Scalia · Anthony Kennedy; David Souter · Clarence Thomas; Ruth Bader Ginsburg · Stephen Breyer

Case opinions
- Majority: Scalia, joined by Rehnquist, O'Connor, Kennedy, Souter, Thomas, Breyer
- Concurrence: Souter, joined by Breyer
- Dissent: Stevens, joined by Ginsburg

Laws applied
- U.S. Const. amend. XIV, Due Process Clause

Town of Castle Rock, Colorado v. Gonzales, 545 U.S. 748 (2005), is a United States Supreme Court case in which the Court ruled, 7–2, that a town and its police department could not be sued under 42 U.S.C. § 1983 for refusing to enforce a restraining order, even though the refusal led to the murders of a woman's three children by her estranged husband. This decision affirmed the controversial principle that state and local government officials have no affirmative duty to protect the public from harm it did not create; a similar ruling had been made in DeShaney v. Winnebago County (1989) which involved Child Protective Services failing to protect a child from a violent parent. The decision has since become infamous, has been condemned by several human rights groups and is frequently cited among the worst Supreme Court decisions in modern history.

== Background ==
The Battered Women's Movement emerged in the 1970s against the backdrop of second wave feminism and changing attitudes about women's family role. Even in the 1960s it was considered radical to challenge male privilege and reject the violence perpetrated against the family and women's agency by male relatives.

Police departments settled into a culture of refusing to arrest men when women accused them. Antonin Scalia, writing for the majority, recognized the "deeply rooted nature of law enforcement discretion" in the Castle Rock decision. G. Kristian Miccio writes that Justice Scalia's analysis failed to explain the reality of police conduct in cases like Castle Rock. She says police refusal to arrest men accused of violence against women is "a result of policies" and the institutional culture of the law enforcement community.

== Procedural history ==
During divorce proceedings, Jessica Lenahan-Gonzales, a resident of Castle Rock, Colorado, obtained a permanent restraining order against her ex-husband Simon, who had been stalking her, requiring him to remain at least 100 yards (91 m) from her and her four children (son Jesse, who was not Simon's biological child, and daughters Rebecca, Katheryn, and Leslie) except during specified visitation time. On June 22, 1999, at approximately 5:15 pm, Simon kidnapped the three girls from their home, in violation of the order. Jessica called the police at approximately 7:30 pm, 8:30 pm, and 10:10 pm on June 22, and 12:15 am on June 23, and visited the police station in person at 12:40 am on June 23. Prior to the second call, Simon had called Jessica and stated that he had the daughters with him at an amusement park in Denver, Colorado.

The police did nothing for eight hours. At approximately 3:20 am on June 23, Simon appeared at the Castle Rock police station and was killed in a shoot-out with the officers. A search of his vehicle revealed the dead bodies of the three daughters, who were determined to have been shot and killed some time prior to arrival at the police station.

Gonzales filed suit in the United States District Court for the District of Colorado against Castle Rock, Colorado, its police department, and the three individual police officers with whom she had spoken under 42 U.S.C. § 1983, claiming she was deprived of her right to enforcement of the order without due process of law. This substantive due process claim was dismissed, but the Tenth Circuit Court of Appeals reversed in part, finding that the mandatory arrest provisions created a property interest in enforcement. An en banc rehearing reached the same conclusion. The court also affirmed the finding that the three individual officers had qualified immunity and as such could not be sued.

== Opinion of the Court ==
The Supreme Court reversed the Tenth Circuit's decision, reinstating the District Court's order of dismissal. The Court's majority opinion by Justice Antonin Scalia held that enforcement of the restraining order was not mandatory under Colorado law; were a mandate for enforcement to exist, it would not create an individual right to enforcement that could be considered a protected entitlement under the precedent of Board of Regents of State Colleges v. Roth; and even if there were a protected individual entitlement to enforcement of a restraining order, such entitlement would have no monetary value and hence would not count as property for the Due Process Clause.

Justice David Souter wrote a concurring opinion, using the reasoning that enforcement of a restraining order is a process, not the interest protected by the process, and that there is not due process protection for processes.

=== Stevens's dissent ===
Justice John Paul Stevens wrote a dissenting opinion, in which he wrote that with respect to whether or not an arrest was mandatory under Colorado law, the court should either have deferred to the 10th Circuit court's finding that it was or else certified the question to the Colorado Supreme Court rather than decide the issue itself. He went on to write that the law created a statutory guarantee of enforcement, which is an individual benefit and constitutes a protected property interest under Roth, rejecting the court's use of O'Bannon v. Town Court Nursing Center to require a monetary value and the concurrence's distinction between enforcement of the restraining order (the violator's arrest) and the benefit of enforcement (safety from the violator).

== Legal analysis ==
Roger Pilon of the Cato Institute said that membership in a civil society, as explained by social contract theory, requires individuals to relinquish some of the rights that they have in the "state of nature", including the individual's power to enforce personal rights without assistance from the state. Pilon says the affirmative right to police protection is, therefore, derived from the natural right of self-defense, and was intended to be protected as a privilege of citizenship under the Privileges and Immunities Clause until that clause was "effectively eviscerated" in the Slaughterhouse Cases (1873).

== Subsequent developments ==
=== Inter-American Commission on Human Rights ===
In 2011, the case came before the Inter-American Commission on Human Rights, a commission composed of representatives from the members of Organization of American States (the United States is a full member by its ratification of the charter document, which is a treaty itself) which found that "the state failed to act with due diligence to protect Jessica Lenahan and (her daughters) Leslie, Katheryn and Rebecca Gonzales from domestic violence, which violated the state’s obligation not to discriminate and to provide for equal protection before the law." The Commission also said that "the failure of the United States to adequately organize its state structure to protect [the Gonzales girls] from domestic violence was discriminatory and constituted a violation of their right to life."

=== Response ===
The National Organization for Women (NOW) denounced the ruling for reducing the utility of restraining orders. NOW President Kim Gandy said "Abusers may feel they have a green light to ignore restraining orders, and police departments under budget restraints could see domestic violence enforcement as a 'no penalty' area to cut resources."

== See also ==
- Lozito v. New York City
- DeShaney v. Winnebago County
- Warren v. District of Columbia
- Domestic violence
- Protective order
- Restraining order
- Refusing to assist a police officer
