= Contumacy =

Stubborn refusal to obey authority

Contumacy is a stubborn refusal to obey authority or, particularly in law, the willful contempt of the order or summons of a court (see contempt of court). Etymologists derive the term from the Latin word contumacia, meaning "firmness" or "stubbornness".

In English ecclesiastical law, contumacy was contempt of the authority of an ecclesiastical court and was dealt with by the issue of a writ from the Court of Chancery at the instance of the judge of the ecclesiastical court. This writ took the place of the de excommunicato capiendo in 1813, by an act of George III (see excommunication).

In the U.S., while contumacy was not expressly mentioned in the U.S. Constitution, the courts have long asserted an inherent power of judges to punish such refusal, which in this context is known as contempt of court. The U.S. Supreme Court, in obiter dicta, recognized federal courts' inherent power to imprison a person for contumacy in 1812 in United States v. Hudson & Goodwin without a reference to a definition of contumacy in common or statutory law.

== See also ==
- Court-martial
- Dishonesty
- Insubordination
- Failure to obey a police order
- Mutiny
- Rebellion
- Trial in absentia
- Whistle blower
