= Voisine v. United States =

Voisine et al. v. United States
- Supreme Court of the United States

Argued February 29, 2016 Decided June 27, 2016
- Full case name: Stephen L. Voisine and William E. Armstrong III, Petitioners v. United States
- Docket no.: 14-10154
- Citations: 579 U.S. 686 (more) 136 S. Ct. 2272; 195 L. Ed. 2d 736
- Opinion announcement: Opinion announcement

Case history
- Prior: United States v. Voisine, 778 F.3d 176 (1st Cir. 2015); cert. granted, 136 S. Ct. 386 (2015).

Holding
- Reckless misdemeanor domestic violence convictions trigger gun control prohibitions on gun ownership.

Court membership
- Chief Justice John Roberts Associate Justices Anthony Kennedy · Clarence Thomas; Ruth Bader Ginsburg · Stephen Breyer; Samuel Alito · Sonia Sotomayor; Elena Kagan

Case opinions
- Majority: Kagan, joined by Roberts, Kennedy, Ginsburg, Breyer, Alito
- Dissent: Thomas, joined by Sotomayor (Parts I and II)

Voisine v. United States, 579 U.S. 686 (2016), was a United States Supreme Court case in which the Court held that the Domestic Violence Offender Gun Ban in U.S. federal law extends to those convicted of reckless domestic violence. The court reached its judgment in a 6–2 majority.

== Background ==
In 2009, an anonymous caller in Maine notified officials that a bald eagle had been shot in Kingman. Investigating officers discovered the primary suspect, Stephen L. Voisine, was not legally permitted to possess a firearm. His prior domestic violence conviction barred him from possessing a gun, resulting from the Lautenberg Amendment signed into law in 1996. During Voisine's interrogation, he admitted to shooting the eagle. Subsequently, officials discovered his 28-year criminal record included 14 convictions for assault and domestic violence.

Voisine joined William Armstrong III to argue that their domestic violence convictions should not have precluded them from owning guns in the first place. They requested the Supreme Court to consider whether the Lautenberg Amendment was constitutional in the light of the precedent of District of Columbia v. Heller that the Second Amendment protected an individual right to bear arms. However, the court refused to consider this question, limiting itself to the question of whether the defendants' convictions for reckless acts of violence (as opposed to intentional ones) fell within the meaning of the Lautenberg Amendment.

During the oral arguments of the case, Justice Clarence Thomas asked a question from the bench for the first time in 10 years.

== Opinion of the Court ==
Associate Justice Elena Kagan authored the 6-2 majority opinion. Justices Clarence Thomas and Sonia Sotomayor were the dissenters. The court held that Mens rea of recklessness was sufficient because the Lautenberg Amendment does not mention intentionality. The court used an analogy of a thrown plate to illustrate the meaning of recklessness in an abuse context. The dissent disagreed with the majority holding that the term "reckless" is too broad under the Maine statute to pass constitutional muster for prohibition of firearms.
