= Refusing to assist a police officer =

Type of criminal offense

Refusing to assist a police officer, peace officer or other law enforcement officer is an offence in various jurisdictions around the world. Some jurisdictions use the terminology "refusing to aid a police officer" or "failure to aid a police officer".

This principle originates from Norman England, where local Sheriffs in England would be the only peace officer in an area. He would summon assistance from locals to enforce the King's laws or to apprehend an offender. It subsequently became part of the common law that all persons must assist a constable or peace officer when so requested. This still remains as one of the few common law offences which exist in England/Wales and some other states/countries.

== Canada ==
Canada Criminal Code (R.S.C., 1985, c. C-46)
See 129(b) for circumstances where it is a crime not to act in the assistance of the police.

129 Everyone who

(a) resists or wilfully obstructs a public officer or peace officer in the execution of his duty or any person lawfully acting in aid of such an officer,
(b) omits, without reasonable excuse, to assist a public officer or peace officer in the execution of his duty in arresting a person or in preserving the peace, after having reasonable notice that he is required to do so, or
(c) resists or wilfully obstructs any person in the lawful execution of a process against lands or goods or in making a lawful distress or seizure, is guilty of:

1. an indictable offence and is liable to imprisonment for a term not exceeding two years, or
2. an offence punishable on summary conviction.

R.S., c. C-34, s. 118; 1972, c. 13, s. 7.

== England/Wales ==
Refusing to assist a constable is an offence under the common law of England and Wales. The offence is committed if a person refuses, without lawful excuse, to assist a constable who sees a breach of the peace committed or who is assaulted or obstructed when making an arrest, and who, where there is a reasonable necessity to do so, calls upon that person to assist him or her. As a common law offence, it is punishable with an unlimited fine and imprisonment, although it is very rarely prosecuted. There have been no prosecutions since 2011 for this offence.

== United States ==
Various jurisdictions require an individual to assist a law enforcement officer when requested, to varying levels of criminal punishment, from violation to misdemeanor:

=== Federal ===
==== Customs ====
§507. Officers to make character known; assistance for officers

(a) Every customs officer shall— (1) upon being questioned at the time of executing any of the powers conferred upon him, make known his character as an officer of the Federal Government; and (2) have the authority to demand the assistance of any person in making any arrest, search, or seizure authorized by any law enforced or administered by customs officers, if such assistance may be necessary.

If a person, without reasonable excuse, neglects or refuses to assist a customs officer upon proper demand under paragraph (2), such person is guilty of a misdemeanor and subject to a fine of not more than $1,000. (b) Any person other than an officer or employee of the United States who renders assistance in good faith upon the request of a customs officer shall not be held liable for any civil damages as a result of the rendering of such assistance if the assisting person acts as an ordinary, reasonably prudent person would have acted under the same or similar circumstances. (R.S. §3071; Pub. L. 99–570, title III, §3152, Oct. 27, 1986, 100 Stat. 3207–94.)

=== Alabama ===
Ala Code § 13A-10-5 : Alabama Code - Section 13A-10-5:

Refusing to aid peace officer

(a) A person commits the crime of refusing to aid a peace officer if, upon command by a peace officer identified to him as such, he fails or refuses to aid such peace officer in:

(1) Effecting or securing a lawful arrest; or

(2) Preventing the commission by another person of any offense.

(b) A person is not liable under this section if the failure or refusal to aid the officer was reasonable under the circumstances. The burden of injecting this issue is on the defendant, but this does not shift the burden of proof.

(c) Refusing to aid a peace officer is a Class C misdemeanor.

=== Alaska ===
Title 11. Criminal Law Chapter 56. Offenses Against Public Administration Section 720. Refusing to Assist a Peace Officer or Judicial Officer.

AS 11.56.720. Refusing to Assist a Peace Officer or Judicial Officer.

(a) A person commits the offense of refusing to assist a peace officer or judicial officer if, upon a request, command, or order by someone the person knows to be a peace officer or judicial officer, that person unreasonably fails to make a good faith effort to physically assist the officer in the exercise of official duties.

(b) A person who, without expecting compensation, assists a person in accordance with this section is not liable for civil damages as a result of an act or omission in rendering that assistance. This subsection does not preclude liability for civil damages as a result of reckless, wilful, wanton, or intentional misconduct.

(c) Refusing to assist a peace officer or judicial officer is a violation.

=== Arizona ===
13-2403. Refusing to aid a peace officer; classification

A. A person commits refusing to aid a peace officer if, upon a reasonable command by a person reasonably known to be a peace officer, such person knowingly refuses or fails to aid such peace officer in:

1. Effectuating or securing an arrest; or
2. Preventing the commission by another of any offense.

B. A person who complies with this section by aiding a peace officer shall not be held liable to any person for damages resulting therefrom, provided such person acted reasonably under the circumstances known to him at the time.

C. Refusing to aid a peace officer is a class 1 misdemeanor.

=== Arkansas ===
2010 Arkansas Code Title 5 - Criminal Offenses Subtitle 5 - Offenses Against The Administration Of Government Chapter 54 - Obstructing Governmental Operations Subchapter 1 - General Provisions § 5-54-109 - Refusing to assist law enforcement officer.

(a) A person commits the offense of refusing to assist a law enforcement officer if, upon command by a person known by him or her to be a law enforcement officer, the person unreasonably refuses or fails to assist in effecting a lawful arrest or preventing another person from committing an offense.

(b) Refusing to assist a law enforcement officer is a Class C misdemeanor. Disclaimer: These codes may not be the most recent version. Arkansas may have more current or accurate information. We make no warranties or guarantees about the accuracy, completeness, or adequacy of the information contained on this site or the information linked to on the state site. Please check official sources.

=== California ===
The following penal code was repealed on August 30, 2019 by governor Gavin Newsom with the passage and signing of California State Senate Bill 192. It is no longer a crime to refuse to help a police officer.

Penal Code - Section 142-181

150. Every able-bodied person above 18 years of age who neglects or refuses to join the posse comitatus or power of the county, by neglecting or refusing to aid and assist in taking or arresting any person against whom there may be issued any process, or by neglecting to aid and assist in retaking any person who, after being arrested or confined, may have escaped from arrest or imprisonment, or by neglecting or refusing to aid and assist in preventing any breach of the peace, or the commission of any criminal offense, being thereto lawfully required by any uniformed peace officer, or by any peace officer described in Section 830.1, subdivision (a), (b), (c), (d), (e), or (f) of Section 830.2, or subdivision (a) of Section 830.33, who identifies himself or herself with a badge or identification card issued by the officer's employing agency, or by any judge, is punishable by a fine of not less than fifty dollars ($50) nor more than one thousand dollars ($1,000).

=== Colorado ===
The following penal code was repealed on July 6, 2021 with the passage and signing of Colorado Senate Bill 21-271.

18-8-107. Refusing to aid a peace officer

A person, eighteen years of age or older, commits a class 1 petty offense when, upon command by a person known to him to be a peace officer, he unreasonably refuses or fails to aid the peace officer in effecting or securing an arrest or preventing the commission by another of any offense.

Colorado Revised Statutes 2013 35 Title 16 16-3-202. Assisting peace officer - arrest - furnishing information - immunity.

(1) A peace officer making an arrest may command the assistance of any person who is in the vicinity. (2) A person commanded to assist a peace officer has the same authority to arrest as the officer who commands his assistance. (3) A person commanded to assist a peace officer in making an arrest shall not be civilly or criminally liable for any reasonable conduct in aid of the officer or for any acts expressly directed by the officer. (4) Private citizens, acting in good faith, shall be immune from any civil liability for reporting to any police officer or law enforcement authority the commission or suspected commission of any crime or for giving other information to aid in the prevention of any crime

30-10-516. Sheriffs to preserve peace - command aid

It is the duty of the sheriffs, undersheriffs, and deputies to keep and preserve the peace in their respective counties, and to quiet and suppress all affrays, riots, and unlawful assemblies and insurrections. For that purpose, and for the service of process in civil or criminal cases, and in apprehending or securing any person for felony or breach of the peace, they, and every coroner, may call to their aid such person of their county as they may deem necessary.

=== Connecticut ===
Sec. 53a-167b. Failure to assist a peace officer or firefighter: Class A misdemeanor. (a) A person is guilty of failure to assist a peace officer or firefighter when, commanded by a peace officer or firefighter authorized to command assistance, such person refuses to assist such peace officer or firefighter in the execution of such peace officer's or firefighter's duties.

=== Delaware ===
Del Code § 1241 : Delaware Code - Section 1241: Refusing to Aid Police Officer; Class B Misdemeanor

A person is guilty of refusing to aid a police officer when, upon command by a police officer identifiable or identified by the officer as such, the person unreasonably fails or refuses to aid the police officer in effecting an arrest, or in preventing the commission by another person of any offense.

Refusing to aid a police officer is a class B misdemeanor.

=== Florida ===
843.06 Neglect or refusal to aid peace officers.

Whoever, being required in the name of the state by any officer of the Florida Highway Patrol, police officer, beverage enforcement agent, or watchman, neglects or refuses to assist him or her in the execution of his or her office in a criminal case, or in the preservation of the peace, or the apprehending or securing of any person for a breach of the peace, or in case of the rescue or escape of a person arrested upon civil process, shall be guilty of a misdemeanor of the second degree, punishable as provided in s. 775.082 or s. 775.083.

=== Georgia ===
2010 Georgia Code
Title 17 - Criminal Procedure
Chapter 4 - Arrest of Persons
Article 2 - Arrest by Law Enforcement Officers Generally

§ 17-4-24 - Duty of law enforcement officers to execute penal warrants; summoning of posses O.C.G.A. 17-4-24 (2010) 17-4-24. Duty of law enforcement officers to execute penal warrants; summoning of posses

Every law enforcement officer is bound to execute the penal warrants given to him to execute. He may summon to his assistance, either in writing or orally, any of the citizens of the neighborhood or county to assist in the execution of such warrants. The acts of the citizens formed as a posse by such officer shall be subject to the same protection and consequences as official acts.

2010 Georgia Code
Title 17 - Criminal Procedure
Chapter 13 - Criminal Extradition
Article 2 - Uniform Criminal Extradition Act

§ 17-13-29 - Authority of arresting officers; penalties for refusal to assist arresting officers O.C.G.A. 17-13-29 (2010) 17-13-29. Authority of arresting officers; penalties for refusal to assist arresting officers

Every peace officer or other person empowered to make the arrest shall have the same authority, in arresting the accused, to command assistance therein as peace officers have by law in the execution of any criminal process directed to them, with like penalties against those who refuse their assistance.

=== Hawaii ===
013 Hawaii Revised Statutes Title 37. Hawaii Penal Code 710. Offenses Against Public Administration 710-1011 Refusing to aid a law enforcement officer.

Universal Citation: HI Rev Stat § 710-1011 (2013) §710-1011 Refusing to aid a law enforcement officer.

(1) A person commits the offense of refusing to aid a law enforcement officer when, upon a reasonable command by a person known to him to be a law enforcement officer, he intentionally refuses or fails to aid such law enforcement officer, in: (a) Effectuating or securing an arrest; or (b) Preventing the commission by another of any offense. (2) Refusing to aid a law enforcement officer is a petty misdemeanor. (3) A person who complies with this section by aiding a law enforcement officer shall not be held liable to any person for damages resulting therefrom, provided he acted reasonably under the circumstances known to him at the time. [L 1972, c 9, pt of §1; am L 2001, c 91, §4]

=== Idaho ===
Idaho Codes Title 18 - Crimes and Punishments Chapter 7: Arrests and Seizures of Persons — Special Officers 18-707 Refusing Assistance to Officers.

18-707. Refusing assistance to officers.

Every male person above eighteen (18) years of age who neglects or refuses to join the posse comitatus or power of the county, by neglecting or refusing to aid and assist in taking or arresting any person against whom there may be issued any process, or by neglecting to aid and assist in retaking any person who, after being arrested or confined, may have escaped from such arrest or imprisonment, or by neglecting or refusing to aid and assist in preventing any breach of the peace, or in commission of any criminal offense, being thereto lawfully required by any sheriff, deputy sheriff, coroner, constable, judge or other officer concerned in the administration of justice, is punishable by fine of not less than fifty dollars ($50.00) nor more than $1,000.

=== Illinois ===
(720 ILCS 5/31-8) (from Ch. 38, par. 31-8) Sec. 31-8. Refusing to aid an officer.

Whoever upon command refuses or knowingly fails reasonably to aid a person known by him to be a peace officer in:

(a) Apprehending a person whom the officer is authorized to apprehend; or (b) Preventing the commission by another of any offense, commits a petty offense.

=== Indiana ===
Information Maintained by the Office of Code Revision Indiana Legislative Services Agency IC 35-44.1-3 Chapter 3. Detention

IC 35-44.1-3-3 Refusal to aid an officer Sec. 3. A person who, when ordered by a law enforcement officer to assist the officer in the execution of the officer's duties, knowingly or intentionally, and without a reasonable cause, refuses to assist commits refusal to aid an officer, a Class B misdemeanor. As added by P.L.126-2012, SEC.54.

=== Iowa ===
Code Section 719.2

Refusing to Assist Officer.

Any person who is requested or ordered by any magistrate or peace officer to render the magistrate or officer assistance in making or attempting to make an arrest, or to prevent the commission of any criminal act, shall render assistance as required. A person who, unreasonably and without lawful cause, refuses or neglects to render assistance when so requested commits a simple misdemeanor.

=== Kansas ===
Chapter 22: Criminal Procedure Kansas Code of Criminal Procedure Article 27: Uniform Criminal Extradition Act

22-2709: Authority of arresting officer.

Every such peace officer or other person empowered to make the arrest, shall have the same authority, in arresting the accused, to command assistance therein, as peace officers have by law in the execution of any criminal process directed to them, with like penalties against those who refuse their assistance.

History: L. 1970, ch. 129, § 22-2709; July 1

22-2407: Assisting law enforcement officer.

(1) A law enforcement officer making an arrest may command the assistance of any person who may be in the vicinity.

(2) A person commanded to assist a law enforcement officer shall have the same authority to arrest as the officer who commands his assistance.

(3) A person commanded to assist a law enforcement officer in making an arrest shall not be civilly or criminally liable for any reasonable conduct in aid of the officer or any acts expressly directed by the officer.

History: L. 1970, ch. 129, § 22-2407; July 1.

=== Kentucky ===
440.240 Assistance in making arrest. Every such peace officer or other person empowered to make the arrest, shall have the same authority, in arresting the accused, to command assistance therein, as peace officers have by law in the execution of any criminal process directed to them, with like penalties to those who refuse their assistance.

=== Louisiana ===
RS 13:5541 - Posse comitatus; penalty for refusal to assist

A. Every sheriff may call for the aid and command the services of every able bodied inhabitant of his parish to preserve the peace in cases of riot, to execute a process of court in cases where resistance is made or threatened. No person shall refuse to render such assistance.

B. Whoever violates this Section may be punished by fine, at the discretion of the court, not exceeding twenty-five dollars.

=== Maine ===
Title 30-A: Municipalities and Counties Heading: PL 1987, C. 737, PT. A, §2
Part 1: Counties Heading: PL 1987, C. 737, PT. A, §2
Chapter 1: County Officers Heading: PL 1987, C. 737, PT. A, §2
Subchapter 6: Sheriffs and Officers Heading: PL 1987, C. 737, PT. A, §2
Article 4: Duties Heading: PL 1987, C. 737, PT. A, §2

§402. Aid required by officer; refusal

1. Officer may require aid. Any law enforcement officer may require suitable aid in the execution of official duties in criminal and traffic infraction cases for the following reasons:

A. For the preservation of the peace; or
B. For apprehending or securing any person for the breach of the peace or in case of the escape or rescue of persons arrested on civil process.

2. Violation and penalty. Any person required to aid a law enforcement officer under this section who neglects or refuses to do so commits a civil violation for which a forfeiture of not less than $3 nor more than $50 to be paid to the county may be adjudged.

Section History 1987, c. 737, §§A2, C106 (NEW). 1989, c. 6, (AMD). 1989, c. 9, §2 (AMD). 1989, c. 104, §§C8,10 (AMD).

=== Maryland ===
Griffith v. Southland Corp. 94 Md. App. 242 (1992) 617 A.2d 598 David Griffith v. The Southland Corporation

KEESLING v. STATE - 8 April 1983

Maryland Criminal Law Section 10-201
Article - Criminal Law
§ 10-201.

(3) A person may not willfully fail to obey a reasonable and lawful order that a law enforcement officer makes to prevent a disturbance to the public peace.
(d) A person who violates this section is guilty of a misdemeanor and on conviction is subject to imprisonment not exceeding 60 days or a fine not exceeding $500 or both.

=== Massachusetts ===
Part IV - Title I - Chapter 268 - Section 24 Neglect or refusal to assist an officer or watchman

Whoever, being required in the name of the commonwealth by a sheriff, deputy sheriff, constable, police officer or watchman, neglects or refuses to assist him in the execution of his office in a criminal case, in the preservation of the peace or in the apprehension or securing of a person for a breach of the peace, or in a case of escape or rescue of persons arrested upon civil process, shall be punished by a fine of not more than fifty dollars or by imprisonment for not more than one month.

=== Michigan ===
The Michigan Penal Code Act 328 of 1931 - Chapter LXX Public Offices and Officers

750.483 Neglecting or refusing to aid sheriff, coroner or constable; misdemeanor.

Sec. 483. Neglecting or refusing to aid sheriff, etc.—Any person who being required by any sheriff, deputy sheriff, coroner or constable, shall neglect or refuse to assist him in the execution of his office, in any criminal case or in the preservation of the peace, or the apprehending or securing of any person for a breach of the peace, or in any case of escape or rescue of persons arrested upon civil process, shall be guilty of a misdemeanor.

=== Minnesota ===
2013 Minnesota Statutes Chapters 625 - 634 — Criminal Procedure Chapter 629 — Extradition, Detainers, Arrest, Bail Section 629.09 — Powers of Officer

629.09 Powers of Officer.

Every such peace officer or other person empowered to make the arrest shall have the same authority, in arresting the accused, to command assistance therein, as peace officers have by law in the execution of any criminal process directed to them, with like penalties against those who refuse their assistance.

=== Mississippi ===
§ 99-3-5. All persons must aid arresting officer when commanded

Every person when commanded to do so by an officer seeking to arrest an offender, must aid and assist in making the arrest, and must obey the commands of the officer in respect thereto. Sources: Codes, 1857, ch. 64, art. 274; 1871, § 2774; 1880, § 3024; 1892, § 1373; 1906, § 1445; Hemingway's 1917, § 1202; 1930, § 1225; 1942, § 2468.

=== Missouri ===
2011 Missouri Revised Statutes Title XXXVII Criminal Procedure Section 548.091. Authority of arresting officer.

Universal Citation: MO Rev Stat § 548.091

Authority of arresting officer. 548.091. Every such officer or other person empowered to make the arrest, shall have the same authority, in arresting the accused, to command assistance therein, as peace officers have by law in the execution of any criminal process directed to them, with like penalties against those who refuse their assistance.

=== Montana ===
Montana Code annotated 2015

45-7-304: Failure to aid peace officer

45-7-304. Failure to aid peace officer. (1) A peace officer may order a person to cooperate when it is reasonable for the peace officer to enlist the cooperation of that person in: (a) effectuating or securing an arrest of another pursuant to 46-6-402; or (b) preventing the commission by another of an offense. (2) A person commits the offense of failure to aid a peace officer if the person knowingly refuses to obey an order described in subsection (1). (3) A person convicted of the offense of failure to aid a peace officer shall be fined not to exceed $500 or be imprisoned in the county jail for a term not to exceed 6 months, or both.

History En. 94-7-304 by Sec. 1, Ch. 513, L. 1973; R.C.M. 1947, 94-7-304; amd. Sec. 1687, Ch. 56, L. 2009.

=== Nebraska ===
006.02O Disorderly Conduct - Disturbing the Peace

Include all charges of committing a breach of the peace. Include affray, unlawful assembly, disturbing the peace, disturbing meetings, disorderly conduct in State institutions, at court, at fairs, on trains, or public conveyances, etc.; prize fights; blasphemy, profanity, and obscene language, desecrating the flag; refusing to assist an officer; and any attempts to commit any of these offenses.

2006 Nebraska Revised Statutes § 28-903 — Refusing to aid a peace officer; penalty.

Section 28-903 Refusing to aid a peace officer; penalty. (1) A person commits the offense of refusing to aid a peace officer if, upon request by a person known to him to be a peace officer, he unreasonably refuses or fails to aid such peace officer in: (a) Apprehending any person charged with or convicted of any offense against any of the laws of this state; or (b) Securing such offender when apprehended; or (c) Conveying such offender to the jail of the county. (2) Refusing to aid a peace officer is a Class II misdemeanor.

Source - Laws 1977, LB 38, § 188

=== Nevada ===
Chapter 199 Crimes Against Public Justice NRS 199.270 Refusal to make arrest or to aid officer.

NRS 199.270 Refusal to make arrest or to aid officer. Every person who, after having been lawfully commanded by any magistrate to arrest another person, shall willfully neglect or refuse so to do, and every person who, after having been lawfully commanded to aid an officer in arresting any person, or in retaking any person who has escaped from lawful custody, or in executing any lawful process, shall willfully neglect or refuse to aid such officer shall be guilty of a misdemeanor. [1911 C&P § 96; RL § 6361; NCL § 10045]

=== New Hampshire ===
Title LIX: Proceedings In Criminal Cases Chapter 612: Uniform Criminal Extradition Law

612:9 Authority Of Arresting Officer

Every peace officer or other person empowered to make an arrest pursuant to RSA 612:8 shall have the same authority to command assistance in arresting the accused as peace officers have by law in the execution of any criminal process directed to them, with like penalties against those who refuse their assistance.

=== New Jersey ===
2009 New Jersey Code Title 2A - Administration of Civil and Criminal Justice 2A:160-17 - Authority of officer making arrest; assistance given

Every such peace officer or other person empowered to make the arrest, shall have the same authority, in arresting the accused, to command assistance therein, as peace officers have by law in the execution of any criminal process directed to them, with like penalties against those who refuse their assistance.

=== New Mexico ===
Chapter 30: Criminal Offenses Article 22: Interference with Law Enforcement, 30-22-1 through 30-22-27 Section 30-22-2: Refusing to aid an officer.

Universal Citation: NM Stat § 30-22-2 (1996 through 1st Sess 50th Legis)

30-22-2. Refusing to aid an officer. Refusing to aid an officer consists of refusing to assist any peace officer in the preservation of the peace when called upon by such officer in the name of the United States or the state of New Mexico. Whoever commits refusing to aid an officer is guilty of a petty misdemeanor.

=== New York ===
Article 195 - NY Penal Law NY Laws › Penal Law › Part 3 › Title L Official Misconduct and Obstruction of Public Servant Generally

195.10 Refusing to aid a peace or a police officer.

A person is guilty of refusing to aid a peace or a police officer when, upon command by a peace or a police officer identifiable or identified to him as such, he unreasonably fails or refuses to aid such peace or a police officer in effecting an arrest, or in preventing the commission by another person of any offense.

Refusing to aid a peace or a police officer is a class B misdemeanor.

=== North Carolina ===
State v. Ditmore, 177 N.C. 592, 99 S.E. 368, states:

"It is his duty as a good citizen, and in obedience to the authority of the state as represented by a lawful officer, to aid in the arrest

§ 17-22. Power of county to aid service.

In the execution of any such attachment, precept or writ, the sheriff, coroner, or other person to whom it may be directed, may call to his aid the power of the county, as in other cases. (1868-9, c. 116, s. 18; Code, s. 1643; Rev., s. 1840; C.S., s. 2224.)

GS § 1-415. Execution of order.

The sheriff shall execute the order by arresting the defendant and keeping him in custody until discharged by law. The sheriff may call the power of the county to his aid in the execution of the arrest. (C.C.P., s. 155; Code, s. 297; Rev., s. 733; C.S., s. 773.)

=== North Dakota ===
Chapter 29-06 Arrest 29-06-04. Persons must aid in making arrest.

29-06-03. Officer may summon aid to make arrest. Any officer making an arrest may summon as many persons orally as the officer deems necessary to aid the officer therein. 29-06-04. Persons must aid in making arrest. Every person, when required, shall aid an officer in the making of an arrest.

=== Ohio ===
Ohio Revised Code » Title [29] XXIX Crimes - Procedure » Chapter 2921: Offences Against Justice and Public Administration
2921.23 Failure to aid a law enforcement officer

(A) No person shall negligently fail or refuse to aid a law enforcement officer, when called upon for assistance in preventing or halting the commission of an offense, or in apprehending or detaining an offender, when such aid can be given without a substantial risk of physical harm to the person giving it.

(B) Whoever violates this section is guilty of failure to aid a law enforcement officer, a minor misdemeanor.

=== Oklahoma ===
2006 Oklahoma code - Title 21. Crimes and Punishments §21-537. Refusing to aid officer.

Every person who, after having been lawfully commanded to aid any officer in arresting any person or in retaking any person who has escaped from legal custody, or in executing any legal process, willfully neglects or refuses to aid such officer, is guilty of a misdemeanor.

=== Oregon ===
2013 ORS > Vol. 4 > Chapter 162 > Obstructing Governmental Administration § 162.245¹ - Refusing to assist a peace officer

(1) A person commits the offense of refusing to assist a peace officer if upon command by a person known by the person to be a peace officer the person unreasonably refuses or fails to assist in effecting an authorized arrest or preventing another from committing a crime.

(2) Refusing to assist a peace officer is a Class B violation. [1971 c.743 §199; 1999 c.1051 §150]

=== Pennsylvania ===
2012 Pennsylvania Consolidated Statutes Title 42 - Judiciary and Judicial Procedure Chapter 91 - Detainers and Extradition Section 9130 - Authority of arresting officer

§ 9130. Authority of arresting officer. Every such peace officer or other person empowered to make the arrest shall have the same authority in arresting the accused to command assistance therein as peace officers have by law in the execution of any criminal process directed to them, with like penalties against those who refuse their assistance.

=== Rhode Island ===
2005 Rhode Island Code § 12-9-11 - Commanding assistance in execution of warrant

Every peace officer, or other person empowered to make the arrest, shall have the same authority, in arresting the accused, to command assistance in the arrest as peace officers have by law in the execution of any criminal process directed to them, with like penalties against those who refuse their assistance.

=== South Carolina ===
Title 23 - Law Enforcement and Public Safety Chapter 15 - General Powers and Duties of Sheriffs and Deputy Sheriffs

Section 23-15-70. Call out for assistance or posse comitatus; penalty for refusing to assist.

Any sheriff, deputy sheriff, constable or other officer specially empowered may call out the bystanders or posse comitatus of the proper county to his assistance whenever he is resisted or has reasonable grounds to suspect and believe that such assistance will be necessary in the service or execution of process in any criminal case and any deputy sheriff may call out such posse comitatus to assist in enforcing the laws and in arresting violators or suspected violators thereof. Any person refusing to assist as one of the posse comitatus in the service or execution of such process, when required by the sheriff, deputy sheriff, constable or other officer shall be liable to be indicted therefor and upon conviction shall be fined and imprisoned, at the discretion of the court any person who shall fail to respond and render assistance when summoned by a deputy sheriff to assist in enforcing the laws and in arresting violators or suspected violators thereof shall be guilty of a misdemeanor and, upon conviction shall be fined not less than thirty nor more than one hundred dollars or imprisoned for thirty days.

=== South Dakota ===
23-24-10 - Authority of arresting officer

Authority of arresting officer. Every such peace officer or other person empowered to make the arrest, shall have the same authority, in arresting the accused, to command assistance therein, as peace officers have by law in the execution of any criminal process directed to them, with like penalties against those who refuse their assistance.

=== Tennessee ===
Title 6: Law Enforcement Chapter 1: Police and Arrest Hendersonville, TN 6-110. Policemen may require assistance in making arrests.

It shall be unlawful for any male person to willfully refuse to aid a policeman in making a lawful arrest when such a person's assistance is requested by the policeman and is reasonably necessary to effect the arrest. (Ord. #1970-36, Sept. 1970)

=== Texas ===
Art. 2.14. May Summon Aid.

Whenever a peace officer meets with resistance in discharging any duty imposed upon him by law, he shall summon a sufficient number of citizens of his county to overcome the resistance; and all persons summoned are bound to obey.

Art. 2.15. Person Refusing to Aid. The peace officer who has summoned any person to assist him in performing any duty shall report such person, if he refuse to obey, to the proper district or county attorney, in order that he may be prosecuted for the offense.

=== Utah ===
Title 76 - Utah Criminal Code
Chapter 8: Offenses Against the Administration of Government
76-8-307. Failure to aid peace officer.

A person is guilty of a class B misdemeanor if, upon command by a peace officer identifiable or identified by him as such, he unreasonably fails or refuses to aid the peace officer in effecting an arrest or in preventing the commission of any offense by another person.

=== Vermont ===
Title 24: Municipal and County Government Chapter 5: County Officers; Powers and Duties

§ 300. May require assistance

A sheriff or other officer in the discharge of the duties of his office, for the preservation of the peace, or the suppression or prevention of any criminal matter or cause, may require suitable assistance.

§ 301. Penalty for refusal to assist

A person being required in the name of the state by a sheriff, deputy sheriff, high bailiff, deputy bailiff or constable, who neglects or refuses to assist such an officer in the execution of his office, in a criminal cause, or in the preservation of the peace, or in the apprehension and securing of a person for a breach of the peace, or in a search and seizure of intoxicating liquors or in transporting such liquors when seized, or in a case of escape or rescue of persons arrested on civil process, shall be fined not more than $500.00, unless the circumstances under which his assistance is called for amount to a riot, in which case he shall be imprisoned not more than six months or fined not more than $100.00, or both.

=== Virginia ===
Code of Virginia Title 18.2 - Crimes and offences generally Chapter 10 - Crimes Against the Administration of Justice § 18.2-463. Refusal to aid officer in execution of his office.

If any person on being required by any sheriff or other officer refuse or neglect to assist him: (1) in the execution of his office in a criminal case, (2) in the preservation of the peace, (3) in the apprehending or securing of any person for a breach of the peace, or (4) in any case of escape or rescue, he shall be guilty of a Class 2 misdemeanor.

§ 18.2-464. Failure to obey order of conservator of the peace.

If any person, being required by a conservator of the peace on view of a breach of the peace or other offense to bring before him the offender, refuse or neglect to obey the conservator of the peace, he shall be guilty of a Class 2 misdemeanor; and if the conservator of the peace declare himself or be known to be such to the person so refusing or neglecting, ignorance of his office shall not be pleaded as an excuse.

=== Washington ===
RCW 9A.76.030 Refusing to summon aid for a peace officer

(1) A person is guilty of refusing to summon aid for a peace officer if, upon request by a person he or she knows to be a peace officer, he or she unreasonably refuses or fails to summon aid for such peace officer.

(2) Refusing to summon aid for a peace officer is a misdemeanor

=== Washington D.C. ===
TBC

=== West Virginia ===
West Virginia Code Chapter 61. Crimes and Their Punishments. Article 5. Crimes Against Public Justice.

§61-5-14. Refusal of person to aid officer; penalty.

If any person shall, on being required by any sheriff or other officer, refuse or neglect to assist him in the execution of his office in a criminal case, or in the preservation of the peace, or the apprehending or securing of any person for a breach of the peace, or in any case of escape or rescue, he shall be guilty of a misdemeanor, and, upon conviction, shall be confined in jail not more than six months and be fined not exceeding $100.

=== Wisconsin ===
Chapter 946: Crimes Against Government and its Administration Subchapter IV: Interference With Law Enforcement

946.40 Refusing to aid officer.

(1) Whoever, without reasonable excuse, refuses or fails, upon command, to aid any person known by the person to be a peace officer is guilty of a Class C misdemeanor. (2) This section does not apply if under the circumstances the officer was not authorized to command such assistance.

=== Wyoming ===
Title 7 - Criminal Procedure Chapter 1 - General Provisions

7-3-209. Authority of person making arrest to command assistance.

Every officer or other person authorized by the governor to make the arrest has the same authority in arresting the accused to command assistance as sheriffs and other officers have in the execution of any criminal process directed to them, with the like penalties against those who refuse their assistance.

== See also ==
- Failure to obey a police order
- Town of Castle Rock v. Gonzales, an American court case on police refusing to enforce a restraining order
- Warren v. District of Columbia, an American court case on police failure to respond to calls for assistance
