= Contempt of cop =

Law enforcement term

"Contempt of cop" is law enforcement jargon in the United States for behavior toward law enforcement officers that the officers perceive as disrespectful or insufficiently deferential to their authority. It is a play on the phrase contempt of court, and is not an actual offense. The phrase is associated with unlawful arbitrary arrest and detention of individuals, often for expressing or exercising rights guaranteed to them by the United States Constitution. Contempt of cop is often discussed in connection with police misconduct such as use of excessive force or even police brutality as a reaction to perceived disrespectful behavior rather than for any legitimate law enforcement purpose.

Arrests for contempt of cop may stem from a type of "occupational arrogance" when a police officer thinks their authority cannot or should not be challenged or questioned. From such officers' perspective, contempt of cop may involve perceived or actual challenges to their authority, including a lack of deference (such as disobeying instructions, or expressing interest in filing a complaint against the officer). Contempt of cop situations may be exacerbated if other officers witness the allegedly contemptuous behavior.

Charges such as disorderly conduct, resisting arrest, and assaulting an officer may be cited as official reasons in a contempt of cop arrest. Obstruction of justice or failure to obey a police order is also cited in arrests in some jurisdictions, particularly as a stand-alone charge without any other charges brought.

== Legality ==
Freedom of speech is protected under the First Amendment to the United States Constitution, so non-threatening verbal abuse of a police officer is not in itself criminal behavior, though some courts have disagreed on what constitutes protected speech in this regard.

=== Case law ===
The United States Supreme Court ruled in Chaplinsky v. New Hampshire (1942) that fighting words that "tend to incite an immediate breach of the peace" are not protected speech, but later cases have interpreted this narrowly, especially in relation to law enforcement officers.

In Nieves v. Bartlett (2019), the Supreme Court held that the existence of probable cause to make an arrest could generally defeat a retaliatory arrest claim. However, it made an exception "for circumstances where officers have probable cause to make arrests, but typically exercise their discretion not to do so." The majority opinion held that a plaintiff may still prevail on a retaliatory arrest claim "when a plaintiff presents objective evidence that he was arrested when otherwise similarly situated individuals not engaged in the same sort of protected speech had not been."

Several federal court decisions have found that expressing contempt for police officers is protected speech under the First Amendment. In City of Houston v. Hill (1987), the Supreme Court ruled that the First Amendment "protects a significant amount of verbal criticism and challenge directed at police officers." In Swartz v. Insogna (2013), the Court of Appeals for the Second Circuit ruled that extending the middle finger at an officer is not grounds to stop or arrest an individual. However, individual state laws that do not directly pertain to police officers, such as statutes for disorderly conduct and curse and abuse, can be legally used in such an arrest.

In March 2019, the Court of Appeals for the Sixth Circuit ruled in favor of a woman who filed suit against a police officer who increased the severity of a traffic ticket after she extended her middle finger at him upon receiving the original ticket. In June 2019, the Court of Appeals for the Eighth Circuit ruled in favor of a man who filed suit against a police officer who arrested him for shouting a derogatory obscenity at him. In both cases, the courts ruled that the plaintiffs' First Amendment rights had been violated and rejected the officers' assertions of qualified immunity.

== Racial aspects ==
The Seattle Post-Intelligencer conducted a study in 2008 that found that in the city of Seattle, "African-Americans were arrested for the sole crime of obstructing eight times as often as whites when population is taken into account." In 2009 the New Jersey Attorney General also found a significant number of contempt of cop cases while investigating racial profiling by the New Jersey State Police, and concluded that "improper attitude and demeanor" of officers toward the public was a nationwide problem.

== Terminology ==
Contempt of cop has been in use since the 1960s. The word cop is slang for police officer; the phrase is derived by analogy from contempt of court, which, unlike contempt of cop, is an offense in many jurisdictions (e.g., California Penal Code section 166, making contempt of court a misdemeanor). Similar to this is the phrase "disturbing the police", a play on "disturbing the peace". It has also been referred to as "flunking the attitude test". In some areas it is called P.O.P. (for "Pissing Off the Police") when a suspect's demeanor influences officer's response to people. "Leniency might be afforded to persons who treat officers with respect, whereas the heavy hand of the law is extended to persons who are disrespectful, ill mannered or rude."

In crime writing and works about police misconduct, it has become something of a cliché to sardonically refer to contempt of cop as the worst possible crime.

== See also ==
- Failure to obey a police order, a misdemeanor charge in some jurisdictions
- "Driving while black", derived from "driving while intoxicated", a similar example of sarcastic allusion to police misconduct
- Law enforcement in the United States § Styles of policing
- Salvatore Rivieri, a police officer involved in a noted case
- Hartman v. Moore, US Supreme Court decision concerning retaliation for criticizing the post office

== Bibliography ==
- Baruch, Rhoda; Henderson Grotberg, Edith; Stutman, Suzanne (2007). Creative Anger: Putting That Powerful Emotion to Good Use. Praeger. ISBN 978-0-275-99874-5.
- Cashmore, Ellis (1991). Out of Order?: Policing Black People. Routledge. ISBN 0-415-03726-3.
- Coady, C. A. J.; Coady, Tony; James, Steven (2000). Violence and Police Culture. Melbourne University Press. ISBN 0-522-84788-9.
- Coleman, Clive; Norris, Clive (2000). Introducing criminology. Willan. ISBN 1-903240-09-3.
- Collins, Allyson (1998). Shielded From Justice: Police Brutality And Accountability In The United States. Human Rights Watch. ISBN 1-56432-183-5.
- Lawrence, Regina G. (2000). The politics of force. University of California Press. ISBN 0-520-22192-3.
- Shapiro, Steven R. (1993). Human rights violations in the United States: A Report on U.S. Compliance With the International Covenant on Civil and Political Rights. American Civil Liberties Union, Human Rights Watch. ISBN 1-56432-122-3.
- Steverson, Leonard A. (2007). Policing in America: A Reference Handbook. ABC-Clio. ISBN 978-1-59884-043-8.
- Walker, Samuel (2005). The new world of police accountability. Sage. ISBN 1-4129-0944-9.
