= DeShaney v. Winnebago County =

DeShaney v. Winnebago County Department of Social Services
- Supreme Court of the United States

Argued November 2, 1988 Decided February 22, 1989
- Full case name: Joshua DeShaney, a minor, by his guardian ad litem, and Melody DeShaney, Petitioners v. Winnebago County Department of Social Services, et al.
- Docket no.: 87-154
- Citations: 489 U.S. 189 (more) 109 S. Ct. 998; 103 L. Ed. 2d 249; 1989 U.S. LEXIS 1039; 57 U.S.L.W. 4218

Case history
- Prior: Certiorari to the United States Court of Appeals for the Seventh Circuit; Appeal from the United States District Court for the Eastern District of Wisconsin, Milwaukee Division, No. 85 C 310, John W. Reynolds, Judge

Holding
- A child has no Fourteenth Amendment due process right to state protection against foreseeable abuse by a custodial parent where the state did not create the danger.

Court membership
- Chief Justice William Rehnquist Associate Justices William J. Brennan Jr. · Byron White; Thurgood Marshall · Harry Blackmun; John P. Stevens · Sandra Day O'Connor; Antonin Scalia · Anthony Kennedy

Case opinions
- Majority: Rehnquist, joined by White, Stevens, O'Connor, Scalia, Kennedy
- Dissent: Brennan, joined by Marshall, Blackmun
- Dissent: Blackmun

Laws applied
- U.S. Const. amend. XIV, 42 U.S.C. § 1983

DeShaney v. Winnebago County Department of Social Services, 489 U.S. 189 (1989), was a case decided by the Supreme Court of the United States on February 22, 1989. The court held that a state government agency's failure to prevent child abuse by a custodial parent does not violate the child's right to liberty for the purposes of the Fourteenth Amendment to the United States Constitution.

The Supreme Court held that the Constitution does not impose an affirmative duty on local or state governments to protect individuals from harm caused by private parties unless the individual has a "special relationship" to the State, which usually involves the State apprehending the person against their will or otherwise being the source of harm. The case is particularly famous for Justice Harry Blackmun's "Poor Joshua!" lamentation in his dissent.

Contrary to popular misconception, DeShaney does not involve the police. Rather, it is about Child Protective Services (called the Department of Social Services in the case) failing to protect an abused child from a violent parent despite knowing the potential danger. Sixteen years later, in Town of Castle Rock v. Gonzales (2005), the Court reaffirmed, holding that a mother could not sue a local government under §1983 for police failure to investigate or enforce a restraining order even when three children who were reported missing were subsequently killed by their father.

== Background ==
In 1980, a divorce court in Wyoming gave custody of Joshua DeShaney, born in 1979, to his father, Randy DeShaney, who moved to Neenah, Winnebago County, Wisconsin. A police report of child abuse and a hospital visit in January 1983 prompted the county Department of Social Services (DSS) to obtain a court order to keep the boy in the hospital's custody. Three days later, "On the recommendation of a 'child protection team,' consisting of a pediatrician, a psychologist, a police detective, the county's lawyer, several DSS caseworkers, and various hospital personnel, the juvenile court dismissed the case and returned the boy to the custody of his father." The DSS entered an agreement with the boy's father, and five times throughout 1983, a DSS social worker visited the DeShaney home and recorded suspicion of child abuse and that the father was not complying with the agreement's terms. No action was taken; the DSS also took no action to remove the boy from his father's custody after a hospital reported child abuse suspicions to it in November 1983. Visits in January and March 1984, at which the worker was told Joshua was too ill to see her, also resulted in no action. After the March 1984 visit, "Randy DeShaney beat 4-year-old Joshua so severely that he fell into a life-threatening coma. Emergency brain surgery revealed a series of hemorrhages caused by traumatic injuries to the head inflicted over a long period of time. Joshua suffered brain damage so severe that he was expected to spend the rest of his life confined to an institution for the profoundly mentally disabled." Joshua died on November 9, 2015, at age 36. Randy DeShaney was subsequently tried and convicted of child abuse. He served less than two years in jail.

== Case history ==
Joshua DeShaney's mother filed a lawsuit on his behalf against Winnebago County, the Winnebago County DSS, and DSS employees under 42 U.S.C. § 1983. The suit claimed that by failing to intervene and protect him from violence about which it knew or should have known, the agency violated Joshua's right to liberty without the due process guaranteed to him by the Fourteenth Amendment to the United States Constitution.

== Ruling ==
The court ruled 6–3 to uphold the appeals court's grant of summary judgment. The DSS's actions were found not to constitute a violation of Joshua DeShaney's due process rights.

=== Court opinion ===
The court opinion, by Chief Justice William Rehnquist, held that the Due Process Clause protects against state action only, and as it was Randy DeShaney who abused Joshua, a state actor (the Winnebago County Department of Social Services) was not responsible.

Furthermore, it held that the DSS could not be found liable, as a matter of constitutional law, for failure to protect Joshua DeShaney from a private actor. Although there are conditions under which the state (or a subsidiary agency, like a county department of social services) is obligated to provide protection against private actors, and failure to do so is a violation of Fourteenth Amendment rights, the court reasoned:

The affirmative duty to protect arises not from the State's knowledge of the individual's predicament or from its expressions of intent to help him, but from the limitation which it has imposed on his freedom to act on his own behalf ... it is the State's affirmative act of restraining the individual's freedom to act on his own behalf—through incarceration, institutionalization, or other similar restraint of personal liberty—which is the "deprivation of liberty" triggering the protections of the Due Process Clause, not its failure to act to protect his liberty interests against harms inflicted by other means.

Since Joshua DeShaney was not in the DSS's custody, the DSS was not required to protect him from harm. In reaching this conclusion, the court opinion relied heavily on its precedents in Estelle v. Gamble and Youngberg v. Romeo.

Rehnquist's opinion stated that although the DSS's failure to act may have made it liable for a tort under Wisconsin law, the Fourteenth Amendment does not make every tort by a state actor a violation of constitutional rights. Specifically, the act of creating a Department of Social Services to investigate and respond to allegations of child abuse may have meant that Winnebago County assumed a duty to prevent what Randy DeShaney did to Joshua DeShaney, and failure to fulfill that duty may have constituted a tort.

=== Dissents ===
The court's ruling generated two dissents. The first, by Justice William Brennan, asserted that whether the Due Process Clause gave Joshua DeShaney a constitutional right to protection against abuse was irrelevant, since it was not an argument presented to either of the lower courts or even to the Supreme Court and "no one, in short, has asked the Court to proclaim that, as a general matter, the Constitution safeguards positive as well as negative liberties." He added that Rehnquist used a flawed interpretation of the Estelle and Youngberg precedents, which Brennan held "to stand for the much more generous proposition that, if a State cuts off private sources of aid and then refuses aid itself, it cannot wash its hands of the harm that results from its inaction." Finally, Brennan argued that Wisconsin's child-protection laws created a regime in which private citizens and government bodies other than a Department of Social Services had no power or role to intervene with child abuse other than notifying the DSS. As such, Brennan held that the child-protection laws constituted the same custodial "deprivation of liberty" that Rehnquist's opinion held necessary for a Due Process violation.

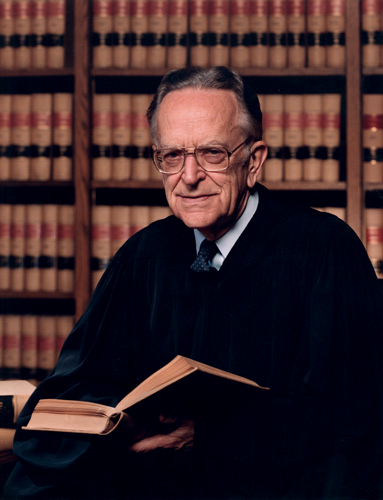
Harry Blackmun, Associate Justice of the Supreme Court of the United States

A second, shorter and more famous dissent was written by Justice Harry Blackmun, who had (along with Justice Thurgood Marshall) joined Brennan's dissent. In the first of his opinion's four paragraphs, Blackmun reiterated Brennan's contention that there had been state action in establishing a DSS that promised to provide protection against child abuse and absolved all other state and non-state actors of the responsibility or authority to act. He went on to compare the Court's ruling to the Dred Scott case, saying that in both cases the court upheld an injustice by choosing a restrictive interpretation of the Constitution and then denying that choice.

==== Poor Joshua lament ====
Blackmun's dissent is famous due to its fourth paragraph:

Poor Joshua! Victim of repeated attacks by an irresponsible, bullying, cowardly, and intemperate father, and abandoned by respondents who placed him in a dangerous predicament and who knew or learned what was going on, and yet did essentially nothing except, as the Court revealingly observes, ante, at 193, "dutifully recorded these incidents in [their] files." It is a sad commentary upon American life, and constitutional principles—so full of late of patriotic fervor and proud proclamations about "liberty and justice for all"—that this child, Joshua DeShaney, now is assigned to live out the remainder of his life profoundly retarded. Joshua and his mother, as petitioners here, deserve—but now are denied by this Court—the opportunity to have the facts of their case considered in the light of the constitutional protection that 42 U.S.C. § 1983 is meant to provide.

President Bill Clinton quoted the "Poor Joshua!" paragraph in his remarks on Blackmun's retirement, and the DeShaney v. Winnebago dissent was, along with his authorship of the Roe v. Wade decision and the first part of his Flood v. Kuhn majority opinion, the most widely referenced element of Blackmun's career in his obituaries. It was also quoted as the headline for Time magazine's article on the decision.

== Subsequent attention to ruling ==
Cornell law professor Michael C. Dorf wrote, "DeShaney was a legitimately difficult case about the point at which state indifference to private action that the Constitution does not regulate becomes unconstitutional 'state action.'"

In June 2010, in the lead-up to confirmation hearings for Solicitor General Elena Kagan's appointment to the Supreme Court by President Barack Obama, Linda Greenhouse in The New York Times wrote:

Two decades later, the DeShaney decision remains a subject of contention. It has prompted a large literature, including at least one book (The DeShaney Case: Child Abuse, Family Rights and the Dilemma of State Intervention, by Lynne Curry) and many law review articles. Lower courts have cited it hundreds of times. The Supreme Court is regularly asked to revisit the issue and regularly declines, without comment, to do so.

The case had entered the confirmation process because Kagan was a law clerk to Justice Marshall when the appeal first arrived at the Court and wrote a memo to Marshall cautioning against taking the case (a) without a signal of wider support on the Court (the "Join 3" response: an agreement conditioned on another three justices first agreeing; Kagan called it the "Join 4" and was corrected by the Justice) and (b) because the Court was likely to rule, as it ultimately did, against the extension of the due process protection to find for the plaintiff in the case.

== See also ==
- Warren v. District of Columbia
- Monell v. Department of Social Services of the City of New York
