= Bipartisan Safer Communities Act =

Legislation of the 117th United States Congress

- Long title: An act to make our communities safer.
- Acronyms (colloquial): BSCA
- Enacted by: the 117th United States Congress
- Effective: June 25, 2022

Citations
- Public law: Pub. L. 117–159 (text) (PDF)
- Statutes at Large: 136 Stat. 1313

Codification
- Titles amended: 6 U.S.C.: Domestic Security; 18 U.S.C.: Crimes and Criminal Procedure; 20 U.S.C.: Education; 28 U.S.C.: Judiciary and Judicial Procedure; 34 U.S.C.: Crime Control and Law Enforcement; 42 U.S.C.: Public Health and Welfare
- U.S.C. sections created: 6 U.S.C. § 665k 18 U.S.C. § 932, § 933, § 934
- U.S.C. sections amended: 18 U.S.C. § 921, § 922, § 924, § 1956, § 1961, § 2516; 28 U.S.C. § 534, § 7906; 34 U.S.C. § 10152, § 40901; 42 U.S.C. § 254c-19, § 1395iii

Legislative history
- Introduced in the Senate as S. 2938 by Marco Rubio (R–FL) on October 5, 2021; Committee consideration by Senate Environment and Public Works; Passed the Senate on December 9, 2021 (unanimous consent); Passed the House on May 18, 2022 (230–190) with amendment; Senate agreed to House amendment on June 23, 2022 (65–33) with further amendment; House agreed to Senate amendment on June 24, 2022 (234–193); Signed into law by President Joe Biden on June 25, 2022

Major amendments
- Protecting Hunting and Heritage in Education Act

The Bipartisan Safer Communities Act is a United States federal law passed by the 117th United States Congress in 2022. It implemented several changes to the mental health system, school safety programs, and gun control laws. Gun control laws in the bill include extended background checks for firearm purchasers under the age of 21, clarification of federal firearms license (FFL) requirements, funding for state red flag laws and other crisis intervention programs, further criminalization of arms trafficking and straw purchases, and partial closure of the gun show loophole and boyfriend loophole. It was the first federal gun control legislation enacted in two decades.

The bill was introduced by Senator Marco Rubio (R–FL) on October 5, 2021, as an unrelated bill, then modified by an amendment by Senator Chris Murphy (D–CT) on June 21, 2022, and signed into law by President Joe Biden on June 25, 2022.

== Legislative history ==
=== Background ===
The bill was introduced in the Senate as an unrelated bill (S. 2938) by Senator Marco Rubio (R–FL) on October 5, 2021: it designated the Federal Building and United States Courthouse located at 111 North Adams Street in Tallahassee, Florida, as the Joseph Woodrow Hatchett United States Courthouse and Federal Building. It passed the Senate on December 9, 2021, with a unanimous consent and went to the House of Representatives, where it passed on May 18, 2022, with a 230–190 vote, with Representative Chip Roy (R–TX) voting present.

=== House passage of gun control legislation ===
After two deadly mass shootings in May 2022—the shooting at a Tops supermarket in Buffalo, New York and the Uvalde school shooting—the Democratic-majority House (on a near party-line vote) passed a package of gun-control bills, including a safe storage bill and bills to increase in the minimum age to buy semi-automatic rifles to 21, ban "High-capacity magazines", and to establish "universal background checks". However, these bills were not taken up by the more divided Senate, which was evenly split between the parties.

=== Negotiations in the Senate over narrower bill ===
On May 24, 2022, Senator Kyrsten Sinema met with Senate Minority Leader Mitch McConnell and Senate Minority Whip John Thune for advice on which Republican senators would be willing to negotiate a gun control bill. They directed her to Senators John Cornyn and Thom Tillis. Thirty minutes later, Senator Chris Murphy texted Sinema to join the negotiation, as Murphy had been one of the Senate's most prominent gun control advocates since the Sandy Hook Elementary School shooting in his state in 2012. Cornyn, Murphy, Sinema, and Tillis began negotiations the next day.

McConnell attributed Republican support of negotiations to a willingness of Democrats to avoid more controversial gun control measures and to include Republican-backed measures such as school safety and mental health support. McConnell supported the negotiations, as did Senate Majority Leader Chuck Schumer, with both Senate leaders pursuing a hands-off strategy of trusting their respective senators to reach a deal that would be agreeable with the party. Senator Susan Collins proposed a criminal statute against straw purchases that was included in the final bill. The National Rifle Association of America (NRA) was also involved in negotiations, though it opposed the final bill.

On June 12, a group of 10 Democrats and 10 Republicans came to an agreement on a framework outlining the provisions of the bill. Provisions regarding "red flag laws" and the "boyfriend loophole" were contentious during Senate negotiations, and Cornyn walked out during talks on June 16. The text of the Bipartisan Safer Communities Act was released on June 21.

=== Enactment ===
June 23 Senate vote by state Two yeas Yea and Nay Two Nays Nay and not voting

On June 21, Murphy introduced the Bipartisan Safer Communities Act as an amendment to S. 2938, which had already passed committee and had been pending in the Senate. Schumer brought the revised bill to the floor and the amendment was approved by a Senate vote of 64–34. The bill was passed by the Senate on June 23 by a vote of 65–33, with 15 Republicans voting in favor alongside all 50 Democrats. The bill was passed by the House on June 24 by a vote of 234–193, with 14 Republicans voting in favor alongside all 220 Democrats. The bill was signed into law by President Joe Biden on June 25, 2022. It was the first major federal gun legislation to be passed since the Federal Assault Weapons Ban of 1994.

== Provisions ==
=== Title I: Children and Family Mental Health Services ===
Title I of the Bipartisan Safer Communities Act provides for Medicare to support states in creating mental health services programs, particularly in schools. It provides assistance to state governments by expanding the Certified Community Behavioral Health Clinic demonstration program, and it requires the Centers for Medicare & Medicaid Services (CMS) to instruct states on how to provide telehealth services under Medicaid and the Children's Health Insurance Program. The bill also requires CMS to provide resources and guidance to state governments and schools in order to provide mental health services in school settings. It creates a technical assistance center to facilitate this goal and authorizes CMS to distribute $50 million in grants to state governments. The bill requires CMS to review and assist state implementation of the EPSDT program. The Pediatric Mental Health Care Access grant is reauthorized for five years under this bill.

=== Title II: Firearms ===
Title II of the Bipartisan Safer Communities Act implements new gun control laws.

Section 12001 expands background checks for gun purchasers under the age of 21. It prohibits the purchase of a firearm if the purchaser has committed a disqualifying crime while under 18 and requires a National Instant Criminal Background Check System (NICS) background check to include the records of state governments and local law enforcement. It also ensures that during this process mental health records under the age of 16 are not disqualifying, that no waiting periods are applied, and that an annual audit take place to ensure that only applicable criminal records are considered. These provisions expire on September 30, 2032, except for the restrictions on juvenile criminal records and the protections of mental health records under the age of 16.

Section 12002 clarifies definitions of gun sellers and requires routine gun sellers to obtain a federal firearms license (FFL).

Section 12003 permits states to use grant funds from the Byrne JAG program to implement crisis intervention programs. These may include "red flag laws", but the bill contains protections for due process, including a right to fair hearings and legal counsel and a burden of proof. States are permitted to choose what type of crisis intervention program to implement using this funding, if any, and are required to provide an annual report on any programs funded through this program.

Section 12004 makes it a federal crime to traffic illegal firearms into the United States. It also makes it a crime to make a straw purchase by purchasing a firearm on behalf of someone who is not permitted to purchase a firearm. Violators of these statutes are subject to up to 15 years in prison, and the penalty increases to 25 years if the firearm is used in a terrorist attack or drug trafficking. It provides law enforcement the authority to utilize several mechanisms to investigate these crimes, including wire-tapping, forfeiture, racketeering charges, fines, and money laundering authorities. It also expands criminal statutes to criminalize smuggling firearms outside of the United States, grants all FFL holders access to the NICS background check system, funds an Bureau of Alcohol, Tobacco, Firearms and Explosives (ATF) education program on straw purchases, funds coordination programs between federal and local law enforcement, and forbids Operation Fast and Furious type programs.

Section 12005 narrows the "boyfriend loophole" by changing regulations on firearm purchases by those convicted of domestic violence. Previously, the law only regulated firearms purchases following domestic assault of a spouse or cohabitant. The bill expands this restriction to disqualify anyone found guilty of a domestic violence charge in a romantic relationship, regardless of marital status. The restrictions apply for five years, after which the ability to own a firearm is restored if no additional violent crimes take place. The provision only applies to domestic violence charges after the law takes effect with no retroactive penalties.

=== Title III: Other Matters ===
Title III of the Bipartisan Safer Communities Act provides for administrative measures to implement the bill. It places a one-year moratorium on the Medicare Rebate Rule to offset the funds spent under this bill and requires that all remaining funds be deposited into the Medicare Improvement Fund. It also prohibits the use of Elementary and Secondary Education Act funds for the provision of dangerous weapons. The Luke and Alex School Safety Act of 2022 codifies the purpose of the schoolsafety.gov website into law.

=== Appropriations ===
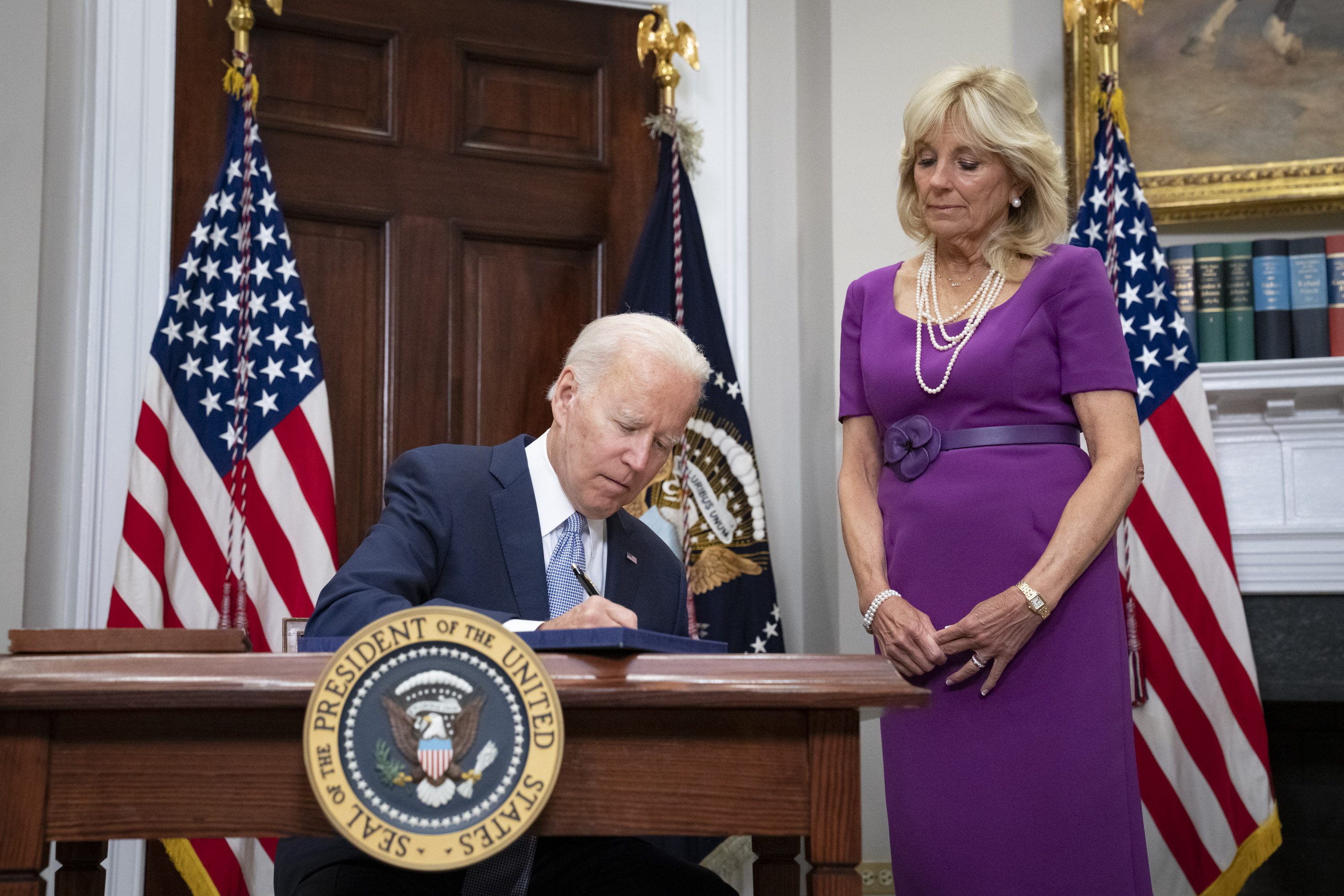
President Joe Biden signing the bill into law in the Roosevelt Room of the White House on June 25, 2022

The bill makes the following appropriations, funded by the Medicare Rebate Rule offset:

- Department of Justice
  - $750 million over five years for Byrne Justice Assistance Grant (JAG) Program crisis prevention programs
    - This sum is allocated to states to support the creation and maintenance of crisis intervention programs for state courts, including red flag law programs and mental health court, drug court, or veterans' court programs.
  - $300 million over five years to fund provisions of the STOP School Violence Act.
  - $250 million over five years for community violence intervention programs.
  - $200 million over five years for NICS background checks.
  - $100 million to fund Federal Bureau of Investigation (FBI) expenses.
- Department of Health and Human Services
  - $250 million over four years to provide states with flexible funding to create community mental health services through the SAMHSA Community Mental Health Block Grant program.
  - $240 million over four years to assist students with mental health disorders and educate school personnel on mental health disorders through SAMHSA's Project AWARE.
  - $150 million to implement the 988 National Suicide Prevention Lifeline.
  - $120 million over four years for SAMHSA to train first responders on how to engage with individuals with mental disorders.
  - $80 million over four years to facilitate cooperation between pediatric primary care providers and mental health specialists.
  - $60 million over five years to train pediatric primary care physicians in mental healthcare through the HRSA Primary Care Training and Enhancement Program.
  - $40 million over four years to assist children that have experienced traumatic events through SAMHSA's National Child Traumatic Stress Network.
- Department of Education
  - $1 billion to provide states with funds to create a variety of school safety programs, crisis intervention programs, and school personnel training on suicide prevention and human trafficking.
  - $500 million to expand the School-Based Mental Health Services Grants.
  - $500 million to expand the School-Based Mental Health Services Professional Demonstration Grant.
  - $50 million to expand 21st Century Community Learning Centers.

=== Other ===
Section 1 at the beginning of the bill contains the original provision that names the United States Courthouse and Federal Building in Tallahassee, Florida after former judge Joseph Woodrow Hatchett. Section 2 names a United States Postal Service facility in Petaluma, California after former U.S. representative Lynn Woolsey.

== Reception ==
During negotiations, Cornyn was booed at a Republican Party of Texas convention for his involvement in the bill, and the party adopted a resolution condemning his involvement in negotiations. Cornyn would later lose the Republican primary to Texas Attorney General Ken Paxton when his Senate seat was next up in 2026. Following the release of the text, Senate Minority Leader Mitch McConnell expressed support for the bill while the National Rifle Association and many other groups opposed it. The bill was endorsed by President Joe Biden and by gun-control advocacy groups such as Everytown for Gun Safety.

Newsweek journalist Jake Thomas praised the law, while also stating that it was weaker than the 1994 Federal Assault Weapons Ban due to its lack of bans on "so-called assault weapons", that being semi-automatic firearms with certain characteristics or cosmetic changes. Reason journalist Jacob Sullum criticized the law, saying it "would unjustly deprive Americans of their second amendment rights" and would subsidize "state laws that suspend gun rights without due process".

== Effects ==
In the months after the bill was signed, gun sales for 119 buyers under the age of 21 were blocked due to heightened FBI background checks, at least 30 cases involving new gun trafficking penalties had been charged, and prosecutions for unlicensed gun sellers increased. Millions of dollars have been put into mental health services for children and schools. In the months passing after of the bill was signed, mass shootings, such as the Colorado Springs, Monterey Park, Nashville and Lewiston shootings, were not prevented by the act.

The ATF finalized a rule implemented under the BSCA on April 19, 2024, changing the definition of "Engaged in the Business" as a Dealer in Firearms.

== See also ==
- Gun law in the United States
- Gun politics in the United States
