= Failure to obey a police order =

Form of unlawful activity

Failure to obey a police officer, failure to obey a police order, or failure to obey a lawful order is a crime in certain jurisdictions.

== Canada ==
In Canada, the Criminal Code makes it illegal for a motor vehicle driver to disobey an order to stop for a police officer. This includes flight from a peace officer. Such a charge, other than those involving death or bodily harm, can be prosecuted either summarily or by indictment. Flight from police causing injury or death is always indictable, with maximum penalties of 14 years and life imprisonment, respectively. A conviction also comes with a mandatory driver licence suspension by the relevant provincial or territorial Ministry of Transportation (e.g. minimum 5-year suspension of Ontario-wide driving privileges).

== United States ==
In the United States, a failure to obey charge is typically a misdemeanor. For example, in Virginia, it is a misdemeanor to refuse to assist an officer in responding to a breach of the peace or in executing his official duties in a criminal case. In Washington, DC, this law is utilized primarily for purposes of ensuring that officers tasked with directing traffic have the authority to direct motorists and pedestrians in a proper and safe manner.

== Sweden ==
An individual who refuses "to obey an official command" given by a police officer may be charged under the Swedish Criminal Code. It is punishable by a fine or imprisonment for a maximum of six months. Notable individuals who have been cited under this statute include Greta Thunberg, who was charged 1,500 Swedish krona for her refusal to disperse from a peaceful protest on September 15, 2020.

== Germany ==
Failure to obey a police officer in Germany can result to hefty fines or up to three years in prison. This is under Section 113 of the German Criminal Code. This law covers active efforts or motions to disobey a police officer in some form. The penalty for this in Germany varies depending on the severity of the act. For example the German court has a list of words deemed offensive.

== United Kingdom ==
In the United Kingdom failure to obey a police officer could pertain to resisting arrest or failure to comply with police orders which can result in large fines or jail time. If the situation is deemed serious enough the fines and potential jail time could increase in severity.

== See also ==
- Civil disobedience
- Contumacy
- Obstruction of justice
- Resisting arrest
- Refusing to assist a police officer
