= Maksim Gelman stabbing spree =

Stabbing spree in New York City, NY, USA

- Location: 40°40.2′N 73°56.4′W; Brooklyn and Manhattan, New York City, New York, U.S.
- Date: February 11–12, 2011 c. 5:00 a.m. – c. 9:00 a.m. (EST)
- Attack type: Killing spree, mass stabbing, carjacking, vehicular homicide, vehicle ramming attack
- Weapons: 8-inch chef's knife, carving fork; 2004 Lexus ES330
- Deaths: 4
- Injuries: 5
- Perpetrator: Maksim Gelman

The Maksim Gelman stabbing spree was a 28-hour killing spree lasting from February 11 to 12, 2011, in New York City, New York, United States, which resulted in four people being killed and five others being wounded. Maksim Gelman was arrested and pleaded guilty to the crimes.

== Timeline of attacks ==
Just after 5:00 a.m. on February 11, 2011, Gelman stabbed and killed his stepfather, Aleksandr Kuznetsov, in Sheepshead Bay, Brooklyn after an argument with his mother about driving Kuznetsov's vehicle, a gray 2004 Lexus ES330. According to Gelman, he believed DEA agents were after him and planned to flee to the Dominican Republic. He claimed he woke his mother to find out where his passport was, and this developed into an argument as his mother believed he was drunk. Their argument awoke Kuznetsov, who came into the kitchen swearing at Gelman in Russian. Gelman grabbed a knife and stabbed Kuznetsov repeatedly. When the knife broke, Gelman continued the attack with a carving fork, ultimately stabbing Kuznetsov 55 times. His mother was not physically hurt. Gelman then took the Lexus and sped off in it, running over a crossing guard and breaking her leg.

Gelman later stated that since he knew he would be caught, he was going to take down "rats" who had wronged him. Gelman then went to the house of a female acquaintance named Yelena Bulchenko, where he killed her mother, Anna, at about 10:30 a.m. He then allegedly left the crime scene and waited several hours for Yelena, who had been staying at a friend's house, to return home. Once she did, she found Anna dead and called 9-1-1, but Gelman was on his way back to the scene to check if she had returned home. Upon arriving at about 4:00 p.m., he spotted her outside on the phone and got out of the car, upon which she yelled at him. He hid the knife in his jacket sleeve and approached her, but she took off running. However, Gelman caught up with her and stabbed her eleven times, killing her, before speeding off in Kuznetsov's car. Ramming into another car, Gelman stabbed the driver, Arthur DiCrescento, three times when he confronted him, before carjacking the vehicle. Gelman later ran down 62-year-old pedestrian Stephen Tanenbaum, who subsequently died of his injuries.

Afterwards, Gelman abandoned DiCrescento's car just before 1:00 a.m. of February 12 and hailed a livery cab before stabbing its driver, Fitz Fullerton. He then approached another car with a couple inside and attacked the driver, Shelden Pottinger, stabbing him multiple times in the hand. He then stole Pottinger's vehicle and drove off in it. After boarding a northbound 3 train at 34th Street - Penn Station just after 8:00 a.m., he stabbed Joseph Lozito, a ticket seller at Lincoln Center. By this time, passengers recognized him from a newspaper article about his killing spree and notified authorities.

According to the initial report, Gelman started banging on the door of a motorman's cab, demanding to be let in and claiming he was the police, at which point two police officers assigned to the manhunt did not let him in the cab. According to a January 2012 New York Times story, Gelman knocked on the train conductor's booth and identified himself as a police officer; when the door failed to open, he lunged at Lozito, stabbed him in the head and face. Lozito fought back and eventually took Gelman down to the ground, at which point two NYPD officers leapt from the conductor's booth and arrested Gelman. Lozito later found out the police knew Gelman was dangerous but did nothing to help him when he was being stabbed because they thought Gelman had a gun; they only acted to help once Gelman was already on the ground.

Later Lozito claimed that officers Terrance Howell and Tamara Taylor hid in the motorman's cab while Lozito was engaging in a physical confrontation with Gelman and did not come out until he had disarmed Gelman and pinned him on the ground. Lozito later tried to sue the police for failing to intervene earlier.

== Perpetrator and victims ==
=== Perpetrator ===
Maksim Gelman (Note: Russian: Максим Гельман, romanized: Maksim Gelman) (born May 31, 1987) also known as Mad Max, the Butcher of Brighton Beach, or the Brighton Beach butcher was born in Ukraine (Ukrainian SSR, Soviet Union) to a Jewish family. He was unemployed at the time of the stabbing spree. Gelman's father had emigrated from Ukraine to the United States in 1994. Gelman and his mother Svetlana joined him two years later, and they all moved to New York. Maksim and Svetlana remained in the U.S. even after Gelman's father returned to Ukraine upon gaining U.S. citizenship. His father reportedly was killed in Ukraine after his return. Maksim eventually became a U.S. citizen in 2005.

Gelman attended James Madison High School before being transferred to Abraham Lincoln High School in Brooklyn, according to a former student there, although it is unclear whether he graduated. He was known around the school as being a skateboarder. His unpopularity left him without many friends or girlfriends, which reportedly amplified his paranoid and antisocial tendencies. Gelman, who was known as “Wes” among his associates, built a record with law enforcement after being arrested many times, mostly for graffiti-related offenses. Among graffiti artists, the few who knew of him viewed him as a largely unwanted troublemaker. Gelman, besides being a dealer of cocaine, prescription pills, and PCP, had been arrested for a number of charges, including possession of cocaine and for graffiti vandalism.

=== Victims ===
Four people were killed during the stabbing spree, and an additional five others were wounded.

Fatalities

- Aleksandr Kuznetsov, 54, his stepfather
- Anna Bulchenko, 56, mother of Yelena Bulchenko
- Yelena Bulchenko, 20, an acquaintance
- Stephen Tanenbaum, 62, a pedestrian who was killed when he was run over by Gelman

Injuries

- Arthur DiCrescento
- An unnamed crossing guard
- Fitz Fullerton
- Sheldon Pottinger
- Joseph Lozito

== Trial and sentencing ==
On February 13, 2011, Gelman was arraigned in a Brooklyn courtroom on charges of murder and assault, where he was represented by public defender Michael Baum. While being led from the police precinct to the courthouse, in front of a crowd of onlookers and reporters, Gelman reportedly showed no remorse, saying that he had been "set up." Although no motive for the murders has yet been offered by the authorities, it has been speculated in the media that the rampage was triggered by Gelman's advances being scorned by Yelena Bulchenko. On November 30, 2011, Gelman pleaded guilty to all charges.

On January 18, 2012, Gelman appeared in the New York Supreme Court, Kings County, for his sentencing. Sitting in court next to his attorney, Edward Friedman, Gelman was reported as being "unruly", laughing or yelling at the judge and the family and friends of some of his victims. At the conclusion of the trial, New York State Supreme Court Justice Vincent Del Giudice sentenced Gelman to 200 years in prison, telling Gelman, "You are a violent sociopath." Cameras were allowed in the courtroom, and photos showing Gelman's reaction at the time of sentencing were widely distributed.

== Lozito v. New York City ==
In the spring of 2012, Joseph Lozito, who was brutally stabbed and "grievously wounded, deeply slashed around the head and neck", sued police for negligence in failing to render assistance to him as he was being attacked by Gelman. Lozito told reporters that he decided to file the lawsuit after allegedly learning from "a grand-jury member" that NYPD officer Terrance Howell testified that he hid from Gelman before and while Lozito was being attacked because Howell thought Gelman had a gun. In response to the suit, attorneys for the City of New York argued that police had no duty to protect Lozito or any other person from Gelman.

On July 25, 2013, Judge Margaret Chan dismissed Lozito's suit, stating that while Lozito's account of the attack rang true and appeared "highly credible", Chan agreed that police had "no special duty" to protect Lozito.

Lozito later went on to give an account of the aftermath in an article published by Cracked.com in October 2013, and again in October 2017 when he narrated a video, offering his perspective of the event and as a warning to others involved in similar situations. Lozito also shared his experience pertaining to the attack in an episode of Radiolab podcast titled "No Special Duty."
