= Muzzle flash =

Light created by gunfire

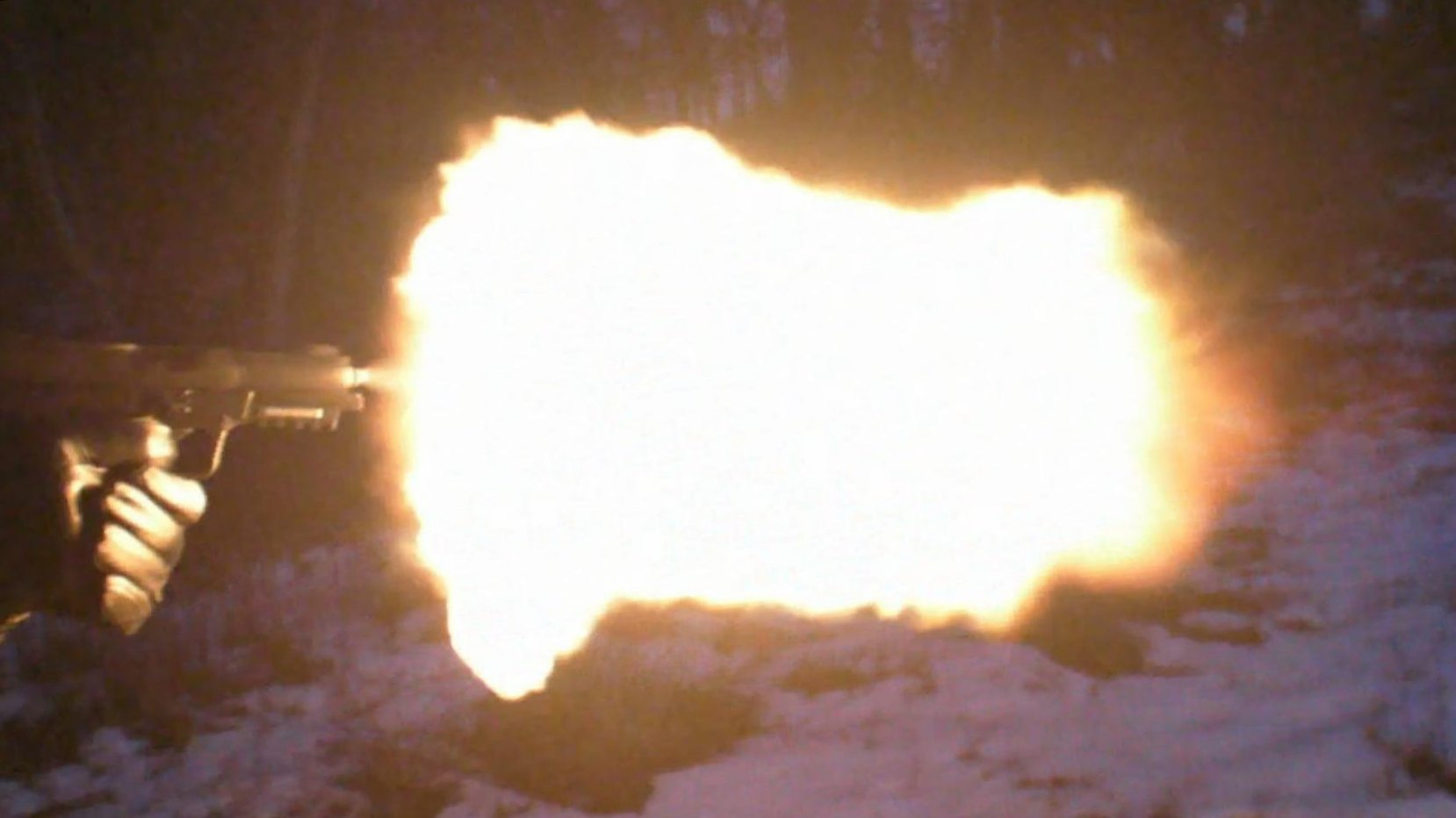
FN Five-seven muzzle flash

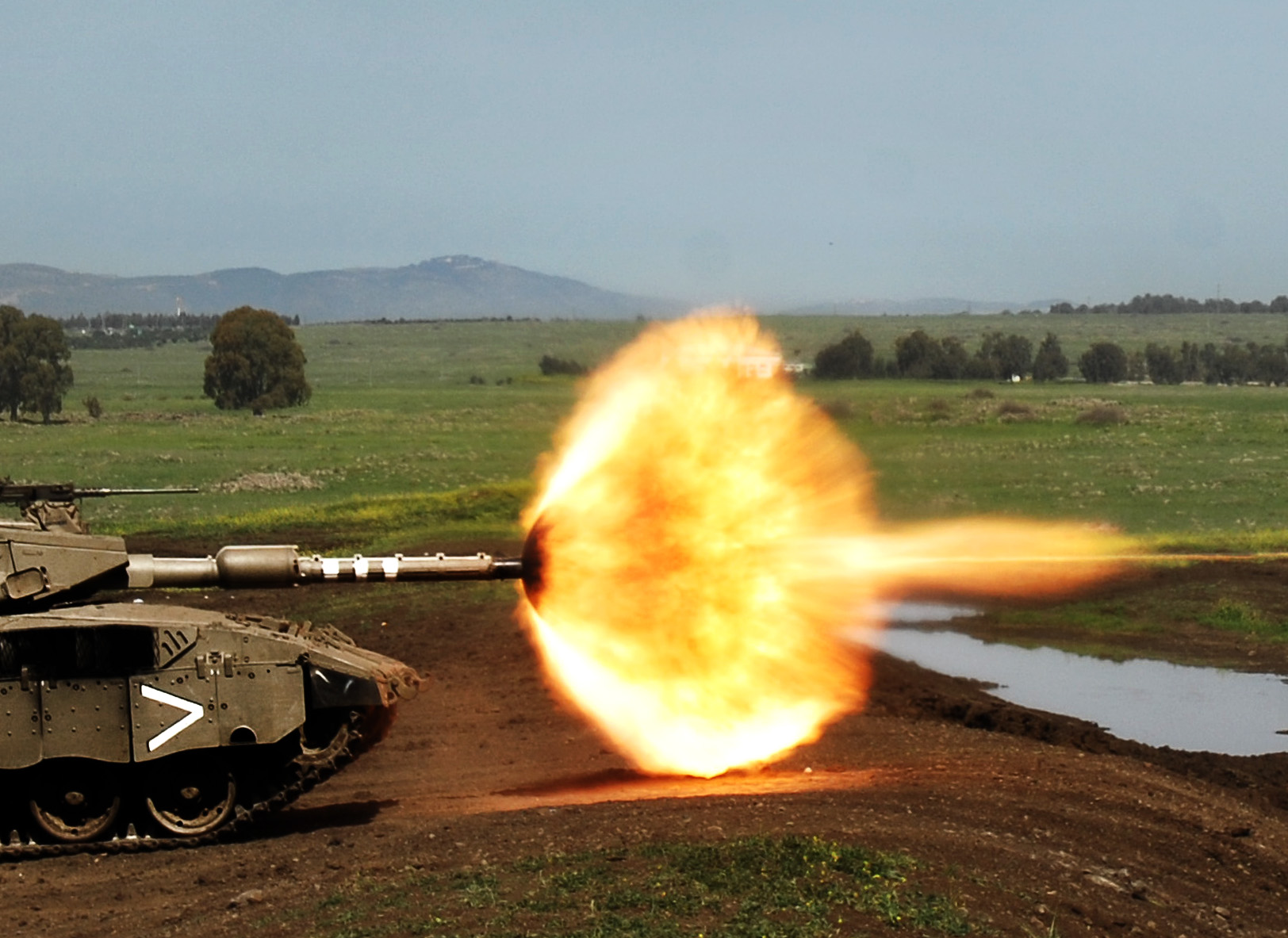
Muzzle flash of an Israeli Merkava IIId Baz tank IMI 120 mm gun

Muzzle flash is the visible and infrared light created by a muzzle blast, caused by the sudden release and expansion of high-temperature, high-pressure gases from the muzzle of a firearm during shooting. Both the blast and flash are products of the exothermic combustion of the propellant (gunpowder), and any remaining unburned powders reacting with ambient air. The size and shape of the muzzle flash is dependent on the combustion energy of propellant being used, the amount of combustible ejecta remaining, and any devices attached to the muzzle (such as a flash hider, suppressor or muzzle shroud).

== Characteristics ==
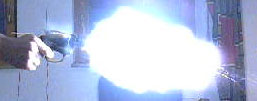
Muzzle flash of a revolver. Note the minor flash at the gap between cylinder and barrel.

Muzzle flash can be broken down into five distinct components.

- The muzzle glow is a reddish glow that is visible before the bullet exits the barrel. The glow is created by superheated gases that have leaked past the projectile and have left the barrel ahead of it.
- The primary flash is caused by superheated propellant gases exiting the firearm behind the projectile, which radiates its energy to the surroundings partly as visible light. Although amongst the brightest of the flashes, the heat of the primary flash dissipates very quickly, and thus is usually not noticeable.
- The intermediate flash is caused by shock waves created by the high speeds of the escaping gases and projectile, and appears as a reddish disc-shape in front of the muzzle.
- The secondary flash appears furthest from the muzzle as a large white or yellow fireball, and is caused by a newly ignited oxidation of incompletely combusted ejecta when mixed with abundant oxygen in the surrounding atmosphere.
- Following the dissipation of the muzzle flash, partially unburnt powder or other heated materials (e.g. dislodged lead, copper and/or carbon foulings) can be further ejected from the muzzle and appear as airborne residual sparks.

== Detection ==
Muzzle flashes create distinct signatures that can be located using infrared imaging technology. Technology is being developed to detect enemy muzzle flashes before the projectile reaches its target.

=== Suppression ===
Muzzle flash, particularly the longer-duration secondary flash, is an inherent issue in most firearms. Due to its brightness, muzzle flash can temporarily blind the shooter, or give away the shooter's location, especially at night. Ingestion of the muzzle flash from aircraft-mounted guns has also been implicated in compressor stall and flameout, causing loss of aircraft.

Flash hiders attempt to suppress the flash mechanically, by interfering with the blast wave using either a cone or a series of slots at the muzzle of the firearm. However, since the primary cause of the secondary flash is combustion of hydrogen and carbon monoxide, chemical approaches are also used. In World War I, bags of sodium chloride (table salt) were placed in front of the propellant charges of artillery to suppress the flash. Addition of a few percent of alkali salts to the powder for flash suppression is common, typically salts of potassium such as potassium chloride, potassium sulfate, potassium carbonate and potassium bicarbonate. In both cases, the salts act as catalysts, and interfere with the hydrogen-oxygen combustion to reduce the muzzle flash. The side effects of the alkali salts are a reduction in power, an increase in smoke, and fouling and corrosion of the firearm and nearby equipment (a notable concern with aircraft guns). Ammonium chloride and ammonium nitrate salts have also been tried with success.

Silencers, while designed to mitigate the loud sound of gunfire, can also suppress muzzle flash. This is done by trapping and delaying the expansion of the propellant gases with containing multiple sound baffles, which slows the gases and dissipating their energy over a larger surface area before releasing them at a cooler temperature. The enclosure of the silencer can also serve as a muzzle shroud to physically conceal any light emitted by the gases and residuals.

== See also ==
- Muzzle blast
- Flash hider
- Suppressor
- Muzzle shroud
