= Muzzle blast =

Explosive shockwave from firearm muzzle

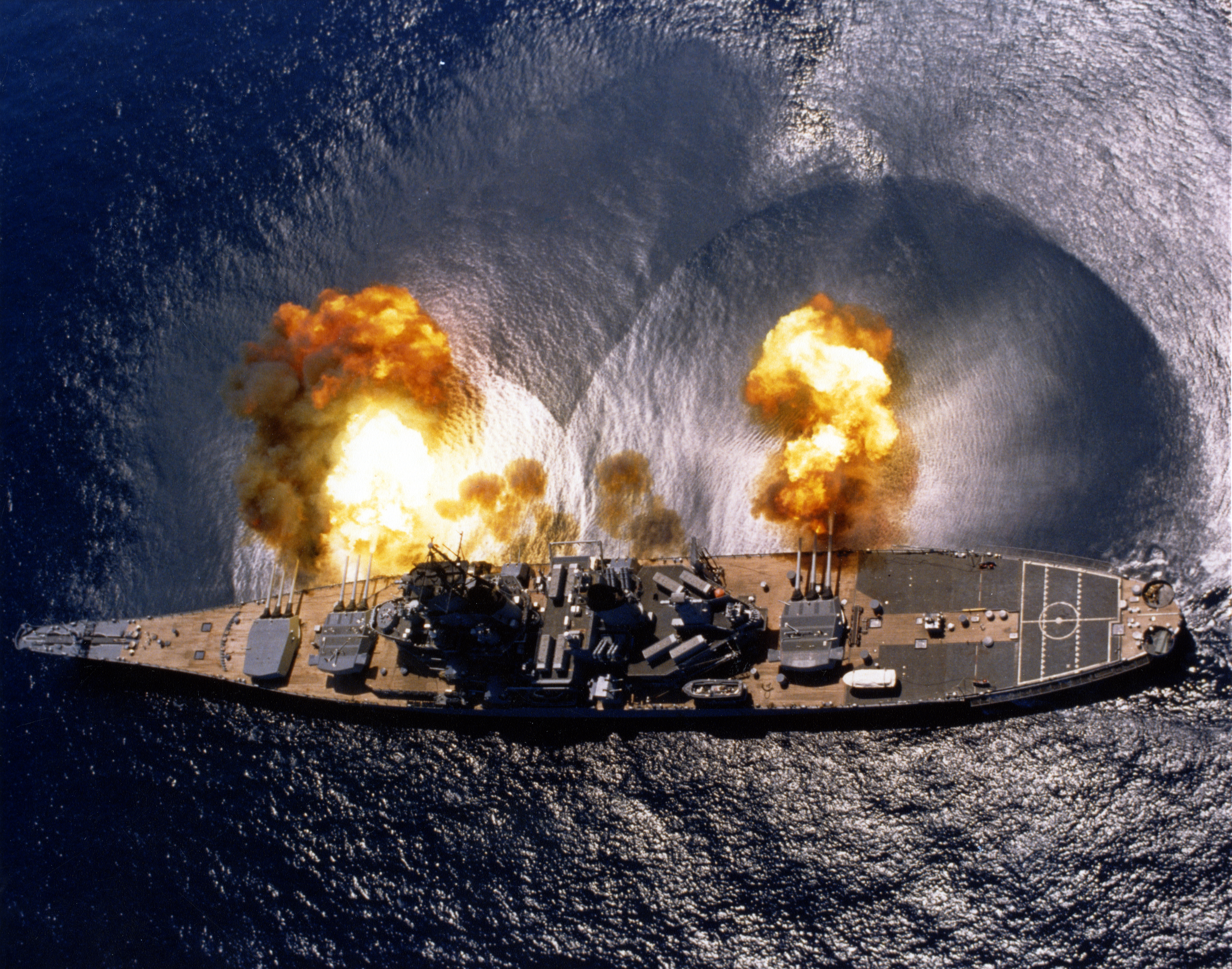
USS Iowa (BB-61) fires a full broadside volley during a target exercise near Vieques Island, Puerto Rico, 1 July 1984, showing the muzzle blast from its 16 inch main battery and the pressure effect on the water surface surrounding the ship.

A muzzle blast is an explosive shockwave created at the muzzle of a firearm during shooting. Before a projectile leaves the gun barrel, it obturates the bore and "plugs up" the pressurized gaseous products of the propellant combustion behind it, essentially containing the gases within a closed system as a neutral element in the overall momentum of the system's physics. However, when the projectile exits the barrel, this functional seal is removed and the highly energetic bore gases are suddenly free to exit the muzzle and rapidly expand in the form of a supersonic shockwave (which can often be fast enough to momentarily overtake the projectile and affect its flight dynamics), thus creating the muzzle blast.

The muzzle blast is often broken down into two components: an auditory component and a non-auditory component. The auditory component is the loud "Bang!" sound of the gunshot, and is important because it can cause significant hearing loss to surrounding personnel and also give away the gun's position. The non-auditory component is the infrasonic compression wave, and can cause concussive damage to nearby items.

In addition to the blast itself, some of the gases' energy is also released as light energy, known as a muzzle flash.

== Components ==
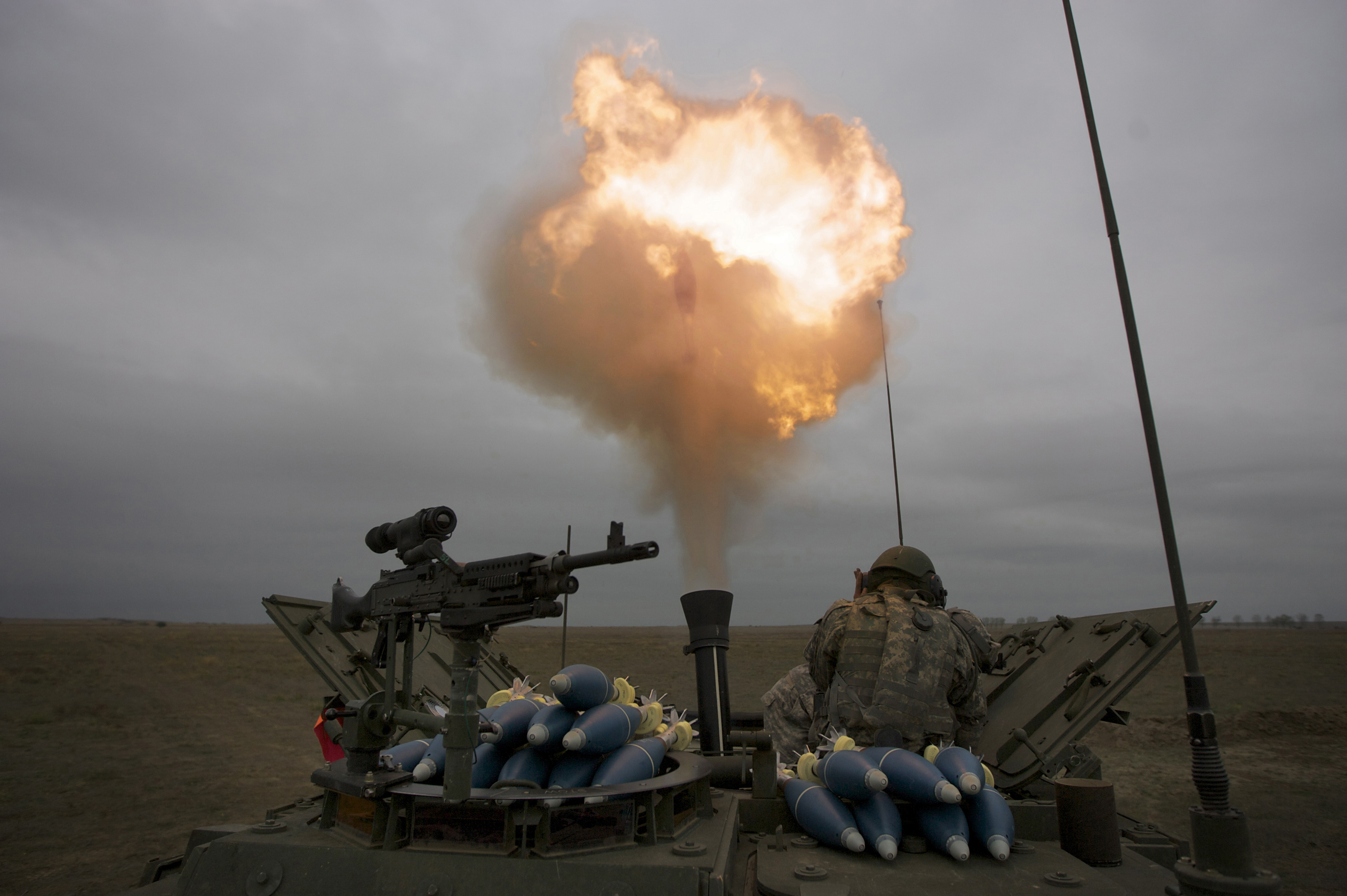
Soldiers covering their ears while firing a 120 mm Cardom mortar from a M1129 carrier.

=== Gun sound ===
The audible sound of a gun discharging, also known as the muzzle report or gunfire, may have two sources: the muzzle blast itself, which manifests as a loud and brief "pop" or "bang", and any sonic boom produced by a transonic or supersonic projectile, which manifest as a sharp whip-like crack that persists a bit longer. The muzzle blast is by far the main component of a gunfire, due to the intensity of sound energy released and the proximity to the shooter and bystanders. Muzzle blasts can easily exceed sound pressure levels of 140 decibels, which can rupture eardrums and cause permanent sensorineural hearing loss even with brief and infrequent exposure. With large guns with much higher muzzle energy, for instance artillery, that danger can extend outwards a significant distance from the muzzle, which mandates wearing of hearing protections for all personnel in proximity for occupational health purposes.

For small arms, suppressors help to reduce the muzzle report of firearms by providing a larger area for the propellant gas to expand, decelerate and cool before releasing sound energy into the surrounding. Other muzzle devices such as blast shields can also protect hearing by deflecting the pressure wave forward and away from the shooter and bystanders. Recoil-reducing devices such as muzzle brakes however worsen potential hearing damage, as these modulate the muzzle blast by increasing the lateral vectors nearer to the shooter.

=== Compression wave ===
The overpressure wave from a firearm's muzzle blast are infrasonic and thus inaudible to human ears, but it still can be highly energy-intense due to the gases expanding at an extremely high velocity. Residual pressures at the muzzle can be a significant fraction of the peak bore pressure, especially when short barrels are used. This energy can also be regulated by a muzzle brake to reduce the recoil of the firearm, or harnessed by a muzzle booster to provide energy to cycle the action of self-loading firearms.

The force of the muzzle blast can cause shock damage to nearby items around the muzzle, and with artillery, the energy is sufficiently large to cause significant damage to surrounding structures and vehicles. It is thus important for the gun crew and any nearby friendly troops to stay clear of the potential directions of blast vectors, in order to avoid unnecessary collateral damages.

== Recoil ==
Typically the majority of the blast impulse is vectored to a forward direction, creating a jet propulsion effect that exerts force back upon the barrel, resulting in an additional rearward momentum on top of the reactional momentum generated by the projectile before it exits the gun. The overall recoil applied to the firearm is thus equal and opposite to the total forward momentum of not only the projectile, but also the ejected gas. Likewise, the recoil energy given to the firearm is affected by the ejected gas. By conservation of mass, the mass of the gas ejectae will be equal to the original mass of the propellant (assuming complete burning). As a rough approximation, the ejected gas can be considered to have an effective exit velocity of $\alpha V_0$ where $V_0$ is the muzzle velocity of the projectile and $\alpha$ is approximately constant. The total momentum $p_e$ of the propellant and projectile will then be:

$$p_e=m_pV_0 + m_g \alpha V_0\,$$

where: $m_g\,$ is the mass of the propellant charge, equal to the mass of the ejected gas.

This expression should be substituted into the expression for projectile momentum in order to obtain a more accurate description of the recoil process. The effective velocity may be used in the energy equation as well, but since the value of α used is generally specified for the momentum equation, the energy values obtained may be less accurate. The value of the constant α is generally taken to lie between 1.25 and 1.75. It is mostly dependent upon the type of propellant used, but may depend slightly on other things such as the ratio of the length of the barrel to its radius.

Muzzle devices can reduce the recoil impulse by altering the pattern of gas expansion. For instance, muzzle brakes primarily works by diverting some of the gas ejecta towards the sides, increasing the lateral blast intensity (hence louder and more concussive to the sides) but reducing the thrust from the forward-projection (thus less recoil), with some designs claiming up to 40-60% reduction in perceived recoil. Similarly, recoil compensators divert the gas ejecta mostly upwards to counteract the muzzle rise. However, suppressors work on a different principle, not by vectoring the gas expansion laterally but instead by modulating the forward speed of the gas expansion. By using internal baffles, the gas is made to travel through a convoluted path before eventually released outside at the front of the suppressor, thus dissipating its energy over a larger area and a longer time. This reduces both the intensity of the blast (thus lower loudness) and the recoil generated (as for the same impulse, force is inversely proportional to time).

== Detection ==
Muzzle blasts can stir up significant dust clouds, especially from large-caliber guns when firing low and flat, which can be visible from distance and thus give away the gun's position, increasing the risk of inviting counter-fire. Preventive actions may consist of wetting the soil of the surrounding ground, having the muzzle brake vector to blast up and away from the ground, or covering the area around the muzzle with a tarpaulin to shroud down as much airborne dust as possible.

Gunfire locators detect muzzle blast with microphones and triangulate the location where the shots were fired. These are commercially available, and have been installed by law enforcement agencies as remote sensors in many high-crime rate areas of urban centers. They can provide a fairly precise location of the source of a shot fired outdoors — 99% to within 33 feet (10 m) or better — and provide the data to police dispatchers within seconds of a firing.

== See also ==
- Suppressor
- Muzzle brake
- Recoil compensator
- Muzzle booster
- Muzzle shroud
