= Muzzle booster =

Performance enhancing device for firearms

A muzzle booster or recoil booster is a device fixed to the muzzle of a firearm, intended to harness the energy of the escaping propellant to augment the force of recoil on portions of the firearm. In spite of its name, a muzzle booster does not increase muzzle force or velocity but instead is usually used to improve the reliability and/or rate of fire of a recoil operated firearm. It was invented by Hiram Maxim in 1894.

The muzzle booster is distinct from the muzzle brake, which is designed to use the propellant gases to reduce the recoil of the firearm. However, unlike a muzzle brake, a muzzle booster uses the pressure of the expanding gases rather than the reaction force. A muzzle booster does not alter the felt recoil of the weapon; it merely adds energy to the operating components.

== History ==
When Hiram Maxim had his machine gun trialed by the US Navy in their new 6 mm smallbore cartridge in the summer of 1894, he noticed that the lack of recoil from the latter was negatively impacting his design. In his patent application on an "apparatus for increasing the recoil energy" in October of the same year the inventor stated: "It has been found that with cartridges such as those above referred to the recoil energy is in some instances too feeble to satisfactorily operate the breech mechanism". Recoil boosters (avant la lettre) similar to his patent were imported to Russia and after some modifications were adopted in the M1905 3-line machine gun, while another derivative was adopted by Germans in 1915 on their MG 08 guns. A later type of a recoil booster designed in 1904 by Trevor Dawson and J. Ramsay of Vickers, Sons & Maxim in 1904 was adopted by the US Army on their Maxim Machine Gun, Caliber .30, Model of 1904, as well as the British on the Vickers machine gun of 1912.

At firing, the recoil from the cartridge pushes the barrel and bolt together backwards within the gun. This movement provides the energy required to extract and eject the spent cartridge, and compresses the recoil spring to complete the cycle. The muzzle booster increased the recoil force transmitted to the barrel by directing some of the escaping gas into pushing the barrel back rather than letting it all expand outwards at the muzzle, in essence acting as an auxiliary gas-operating system, with the barrel acting the role of the operating rod. This increased the initial velocity of the barrel and bolt, providing more energy for the operation of the mechanism.

== Construction ==
Animation of the Vickers muzzle booster operation, showing the expanding gases pushing the barrel to the rear relative to the cooling jacket

A Vickers-type muzzle (or recoil) booster, the "typical" type, consists of two parts: a flared "cup" on the muzzle of the barrel, and a perforated tube around the end of the muzzle, attached to the main body of the weapon. The end of the latter is closed except for a small hole for the bullet to pass through. As the bullet exits the barrel, the expanding gases follow it into the chamber created between the cup and the shroud. As it passes through the close tolerance hole in the end of the perforated tube, it temporarily forms a blockage to further forward movement of the expanding gas from the barrel. The pressure inside the booster rises very rapidly as the gases continue to expand in the confined space (even after the bullet has cleared the hole, the gas pressure is still very high).

The cup on the muzzle of the barrel provides a large, movable surface for the gas to push against, as it exerts force equally in all directions. As the outer shroud is fixed to the main frame of the gun, and only the barrel is movable, the pressure forces the cup and barrel to the rear, acting exactly as a piston in a cylinder. As the barrel cycles to the rear, the cup passes the perforations in the outer shroud, opening an escape path for the gases, immediately lowering the pressure, both reducing the harsh impact when the barrel reaches full recoil and preventing the remaining pressure from the gases from acting as a "spring" and slowing the barrel when it begins to travel forwards again (which would only slow the rate of fire). The barrel continues to the rear on its own momentum, and actuates the operating mechanism. The resulting action can be seen as a composite of the recoil action and a gas action — the barrel being acted upon as if it were the piston. Muzzle boosters in other weapons act in a similar fashion.

The name of "muzzle booster" can be misleading. The pressure within the muzzle shroud is exerted equally in all directions, pushing forwards on the shroud with the same force as it pushes the muzzle cup and barrel to the rear; thus, the actual felt recoil of the weapon is not increased, even though the force imparted to the operating system is.

It is unlike a muzzle brake in that the muzzle booster extracts work from the pressure of the expanding gasses, while a muzzle brake relies on redirecting the reaction force of the fast moving gases at the muzzle. In fact, by trapping and slowing, and then redirecting the gases sideways, the device also called a "recoil booster" actually somewhat reduces the felt recoil of the weapon, by eliminating the reaction component of expanding gases escaping the muzzle in a forward direction.

== Applications ==
=== Historical ===
The original use of the recoil booster was to provide additional energy to move the large barrel/bolt mass on recoil operated machine guns.

At the start of WWI the primary German machine gun was the Maxim-based MG 08, a water-cooled heavy machine gun equipped with a blank firing adapter but not a muzzle booster. Because of that it was inferior to similar British and Russian analogs with recoil boosters in its rate of fire and reliability, and by 1915 Germans introduced their booster designated Rückstossverstärker 08 S, increasing the rate of fire by about 50%.

The cooling jacket for all those designs also acted as the frame within which the barrel recoiled on firing, and which the fixed portion of the muzzle booster was mounted on. In 1915 an air-cooled version was created for use as a fixed aircraft gun, designated the lMG 08 (or LMG 08, traditionally with a lower case "L"). Eliminating water cooling saved a great deal of weight, but the water jacket was a crucial component of the gun, as it held the bushing which supported the muzzle end of the barrel and allowed it to recoil. Thus, the water jacket structure was retained, but was heavily perforated to allow cooling air-flow to reach the barrel, leaving more open space than metal. This much-lightened structure, resulting from just over 50% of the jacket's circumferential sheetmetal removed for its cooling slots; was strong enough to support the barrel, but not enough to handle the powerful forward counter-force created when the expanding gases in a muzzle brake forced the barrel rearwards. Thus, early versions of the lMG 08 deleted the muzzle booster, although later versions of the lMG 08, and its replacement, the lightened-receiver LMG 08/15 model which reduced the cooling barrel's diameter to just 92.5 mm, changed to a less-heavily perforated barrel shroud which could handle a muzzle booster, as it was realized that with the airflow over an aircraft-mounted machine gun, the fifty-percent-plus amount originally removed had been excessive.

The World War II-era German MG 42 was another such machine gun which also made use of a muzzle booster. This application has largely fallen out of use as modern machine gun design switched to delayed blowback and gas operation in many cases. The Rheinmetall MG 3, essentially an MG 42 modified to use the standard 7.62×51mm NATO round, and currently used by the German military, still uses a boosted short recoil design.

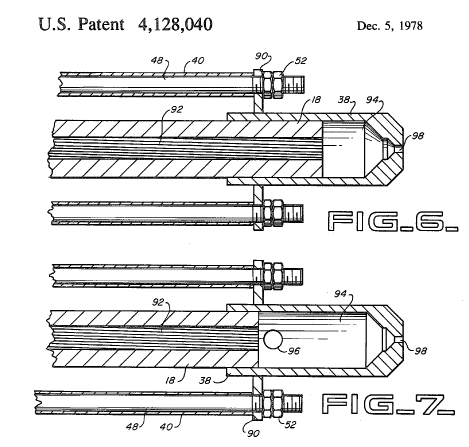
Drawings from US patent 4,128,040, for a blank firing adapter for the short recoil operated M2 Browning machine gun

=== Modern ===
Recoil boosters have found a use in suppressors on short-recoil operated semi-automatic pistols (i.e., most modern centerfire pistols chambered for 9mm and above). Such pistols have a barrel and slide assembly which recoils a short distance upon firing before the barrel is unlocked from the slide (usually by tilting the barrel in order to separate the interlocking lugs on the barrel and the slide). Since the weapon relies on momentum to carry the slide all the way to the rear to operate the mechanism, and it is designed to work with a given weight of slide and barrel, and a given power of cartridge, adding the extra weight to the barrel by screwing on a suppressor will interfere with the gun's ability to properly cycle the action after each shot, resulting in stoppages. By incorporating a recoil booster (also known as a Nielsen device), the weight of the suppressor can be uncoupled from the barrel at the moment of firing, allowing the pistol to function properly by boosting the recoil energy of the barrel and slide, and by temporarily decreasing the effective attached weight. This is achieved by mounting the body of the silencer to a spring, which attaches to a piece that screws onto the muzzle of the firearm. When fired, the force of the gases expanding inside the baffles of the suppressor act to force the suppressor body forward in relation to the barrel. The spring allows the barrel to recoil while the suppressor stays in place; the pressure of the gases between the two components helps force them apart as well, much like the Vickers-type boosters described above. Many suppressor boosters incorporate an indexing system which allows the suppressor to be reoriented in a number of different rotational positions, allowing the end user to fine-tune the weapon's point of aim.

Some pistols which are blowback, delayed blowback or gas operated have fixed, i.e., non-moving barrels, which do not benefit from a Nielsen device. Examples of such pistols are: the H&K P7 and P9, Walther PP/PPK, Korth PRS, Korriphila HSP 701, Makarov, CZ 82 and others. In certain cases, spacers can be used to allow the use of a Nielsen device-equipped suppressor on a fixed-barrel pistol.

The Smith & Wesson M&P57 uses a muzzle booster but unlike older designs gas ports are placed behind the end of the barrel, this never creates a gap between the barrel and its shroud.

Some blank firing adapters (BFAs) act as recoil boosters, harnessing the gases produced by the blank cartridge to compensate for the lack of back pressure that would normally occur as the bullet traps the expanding propellant gases until the bullet clears the barrel. This is important on gas-operated firearms, as they rely on tapping some of the pressure built up behind an accelerating bullet moving up the barrel. Without a bullet to act as a "plug", the gases simply rush out the muzzle without generating enough pressure to cycle the weapon properly, since such devices are often fine-tuned to work only within a certain limited range of gas pressures.

Rear of a suppressor with the Nielsen device protruding (completely assembled)

Retaining ring unscrewed and Nielsen device partially removed

Nielsen device completely removed and disassembled

Rear of suppressor showing the rotational indexing system incorporated into some Nielsen devices

== See also ==
=== Other muzzle devices ===
- Muzzle brake
- Flash suppressor
- Sound suppressor
- Muzzle shroud
