= Barrel shroud =

Firearm covering protective against burns

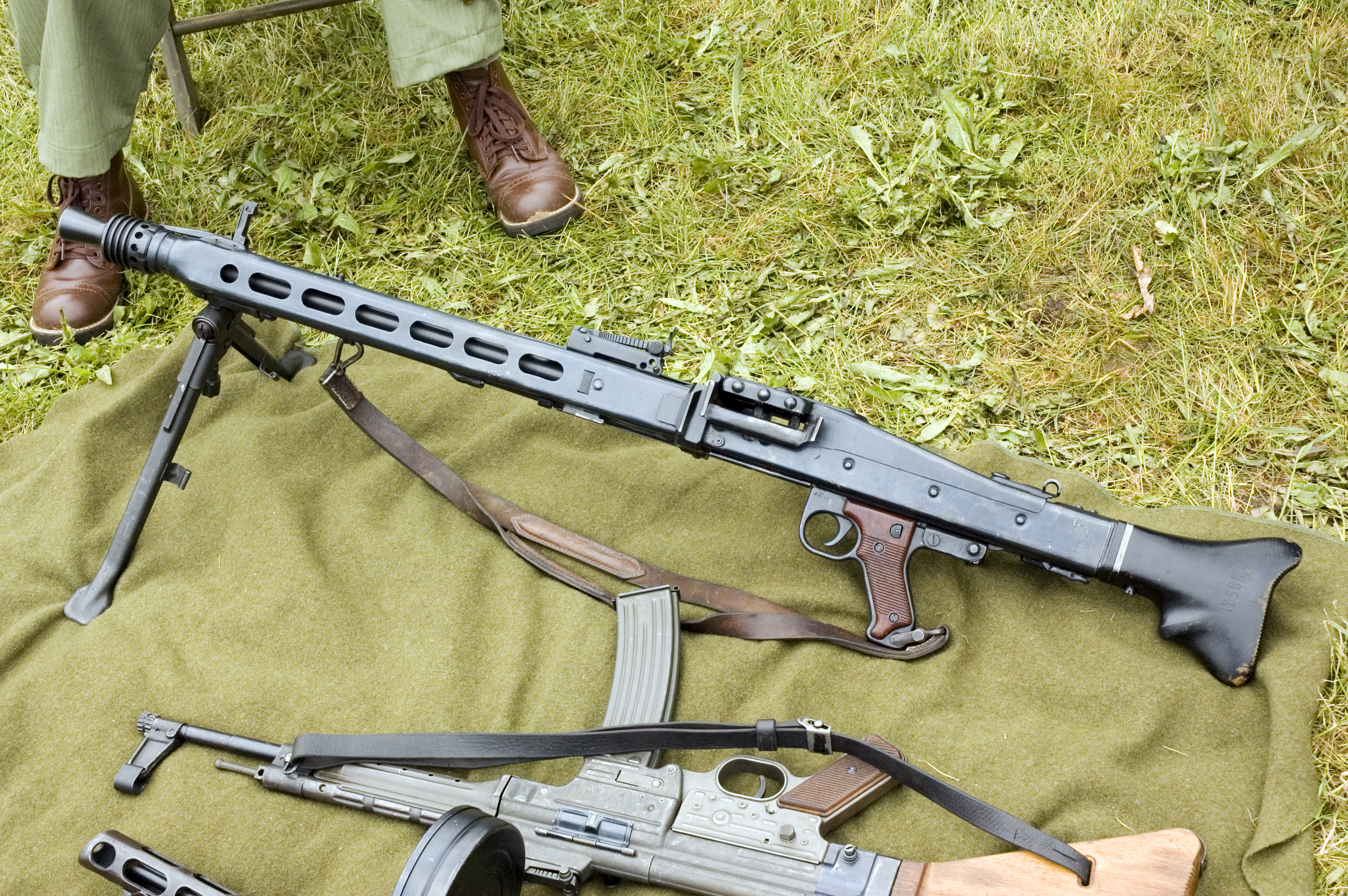
An MG-42 medium machinegun with a fully shrouded barrel.

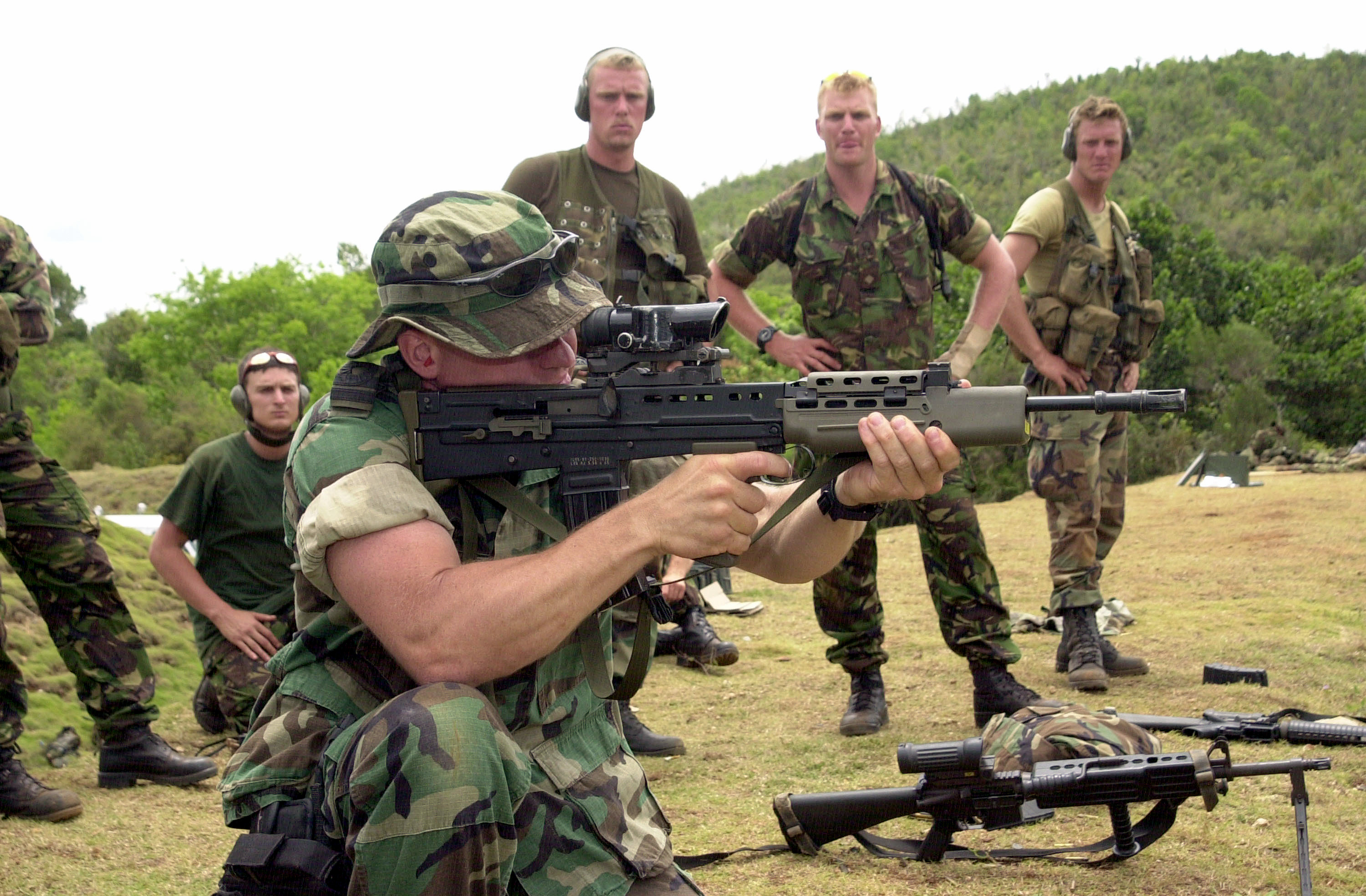
An L85A2 rifle with a partially-shrouded barrel

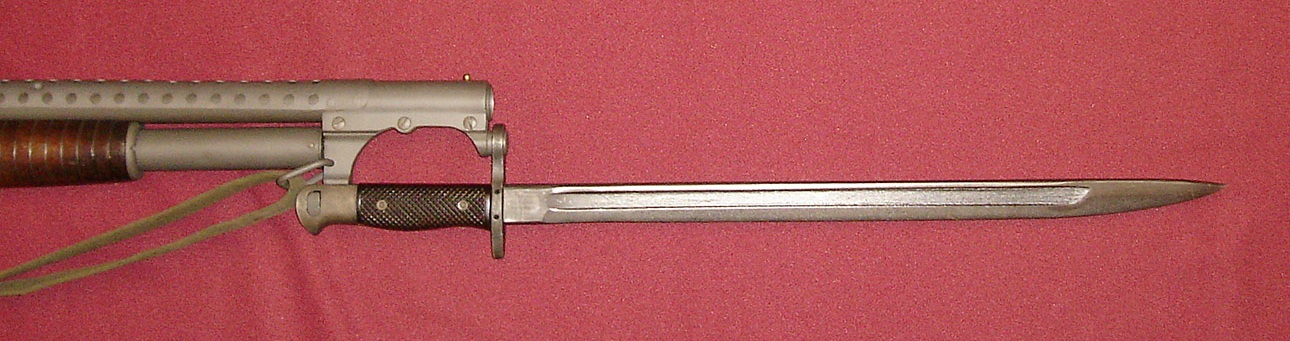
A Winchester Model 12 combat shotgun with a barrel shroud and attached bayonet.

A barrel shroud is an external covering that envelops (either partially or full-length) the barrel of a firearm to prevent unwanted direct contact with the barrel (e.g. accidental collision with surrounding objects or the user accidentally touching a hot barrel, which can lead to burns). Moving coverings such as pistol slides, fore-end extensions of the gunstock/chassis that do not fully encircle the barrel, and the receiver (or frame) of a firearm itself are generally not described as barrel shrouds, though they can functionally act as such.

In shotguns, a thin, slim partial shroud known as a rib is often mounted above the barrel to shield away the mirage generated by barrel heat, which can interfere with aiming.

Full-length barrel shrouds are commonly featured on air-cooled machine guns, where frequent rapid bursts or sustained automatic fire will leave the barrel extremely hot and dangerous to the user. However, shrouds can also be used on semi-automatic firearms, especially the ones with light-weight barrels, as even a small number of shots can heat up a barrel enough to injure the user in certain circumstances.

Barrel shrouds are also used on pump-action shotguns. The military trench shotgun features a ventilated metal handguard with a bayonet attachment lug. Ventilated handguards or heat shields (usually without bayonet lugs) are also used on police riot shotguns and shotguns marketed for civilian self-defense. The heat shield also serves as an attachment base for accessories, such as sights or sling swivels.

== Handguard ==
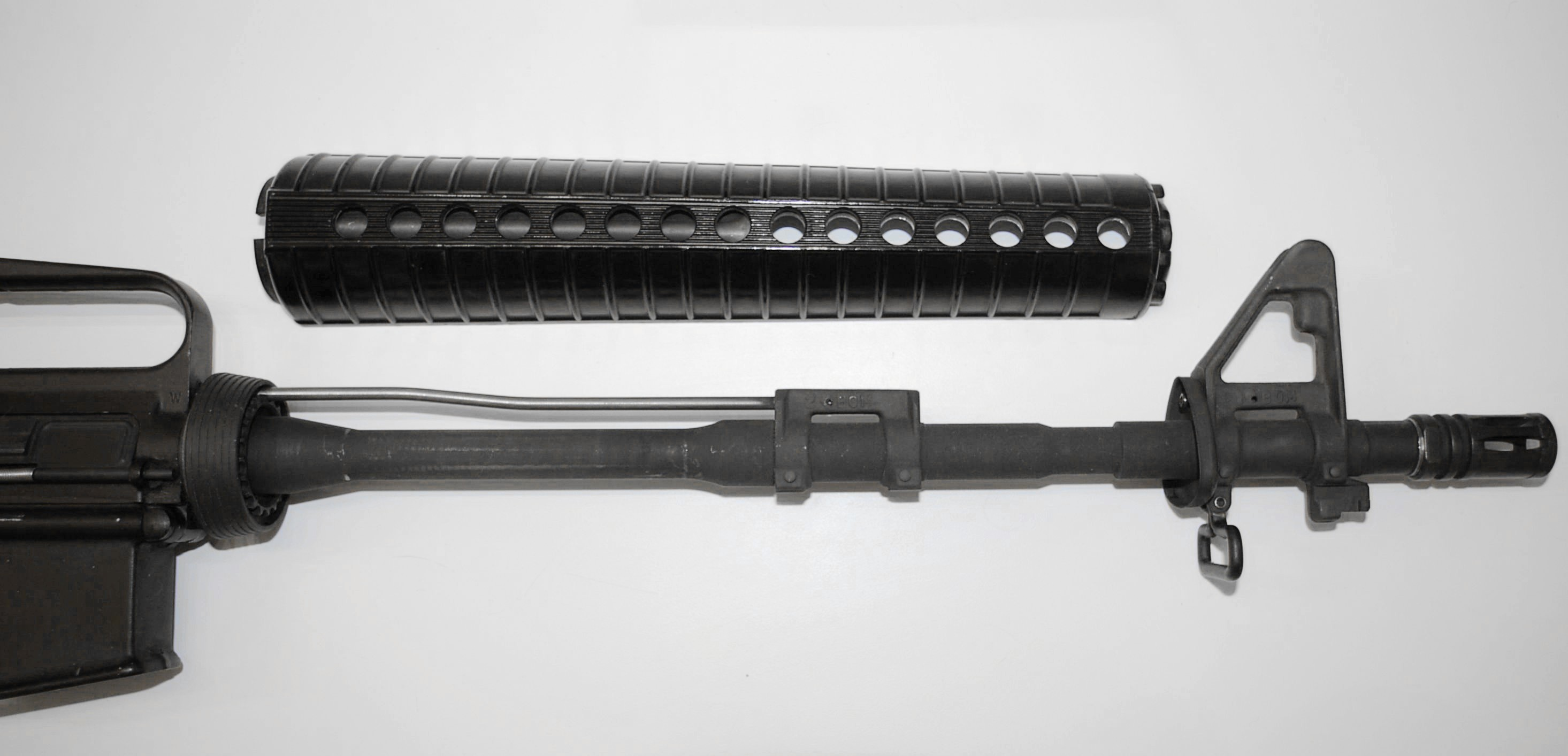
Handguard

A handguard (also known as the forend, fore-end, or forearm) on firearms is a barrel shroud specifically designed to allow the user to grip the front of the gun. It provides a safe heat-insulated surface for the user's hand to firmly hold onto without needing to worry about getting burned by the barrel, which may become very hot when firing. It can also serve as an attachment platform for secondary weapons (such as an underslung M203 grenade launcher or M26-MASS) as well as accessories such as bipods, tactical lights, laser sights, night-vision devices, foregrips (or handstops), slings and a variety of other attachments.

Handguards are typically available in two types, determined by whether or not they contact the barrel directly. If one does, it will usually have a contact point at the base of the barrel (because it is an extension of the stock) and another at a predetermined length up the barrel. They are typically made of polymer but can be made of different types of alloys. This type of handguard is also available as a "drop-in", i.e., an aftermarket modification, in which case it will not be an extension of the stock, but rather two pieces that attach to each other around the barrel via some sort of mounting system, such as M-LOK, KeyMod, or Picatinny.

The other type attaches around the barrel but does not make contact with it directly. This particular type of handguard is, the majority of the time, made out of some form of aluminum or aluminum alloy. That allows for what is considered a free-floating barrel. Free floating barrels are reputed to have greater accuracy than their counterparts. When not built into the firearm, they also use a variety of mounting systems, with the main ones being M-LOK, KeyMod, and Picatinny.

=== Free-floating handguard ===
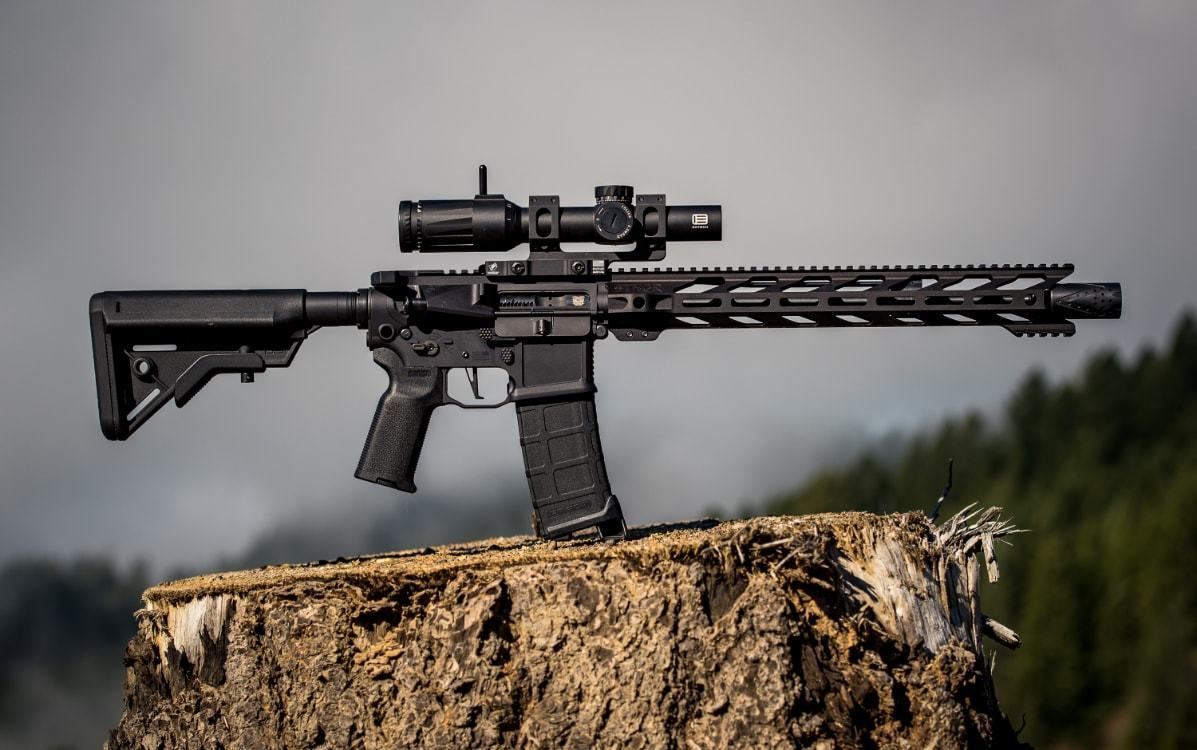
AR-15 featuring a HWK M-LOK Free Float Handguard by STNGR USA

Free-floating handguards, also referred to as "floating" handguards, have seen a rise in popularity in recent years. They work by only attaching to the firearm at one point (on the barrel nut by the upper receiver) while the remainder of the handguard does not make contact with the barrel. This gives the impression that the handguard is "floating" around the barrel, hence the name; the barrel will be referred to as a free-floating barrel.

Because they avoid barrel warping, free-floating handguards have been known to increase accuracy between 0.5 and 0.75 MOA (0.15–0.2 mrad) compared to their drop-in counterparts.

Barrel warping occurs when the handguard makes contact with the barrel, which then slightly alters the barrel's angle, reducing accuracy. This can occur when a rifle is propped up against a surface or with a bipod. Force exerted onto the handguard pushes back up against the barrel, which deflects the barrel, reducing accuracy. The angle may seem insignificant; however, even a slight deviation can cause the shot to dramatically deviate down range. Damage to the handguard—-such as if a wooden one warps—-can also cause barrel warping without any external force.

== See also ==
- M-LOK – free licensed competing standard to KeyMod
- KeyMod – open sourced competing standard to M-Lok
- Muzzle shroud
- Forearm
- Thermal sleeve
