= Flash suppressor =

Firearm muzzle attachment that reduces the visibility of burning exhaust gas

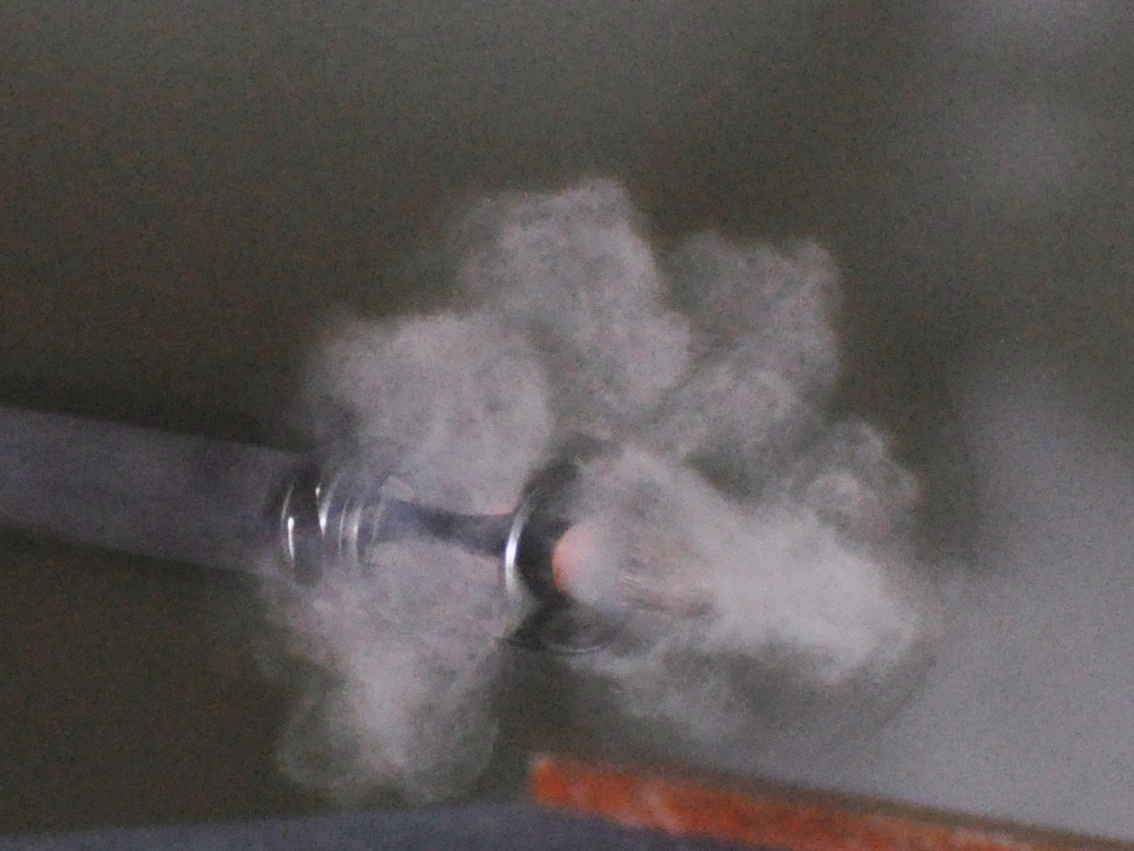
Bullet exiting an A2-style flash suppressor, photographed with a high-speed air-gap flash

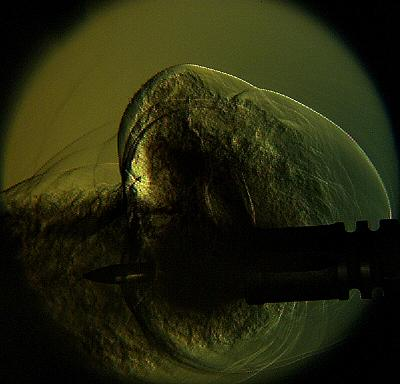
This image was taken from a high-speed Schlieren video of a flash suppressor. Schlieren imaging reveals the heat and pressure gradients invisible to standard imaging.

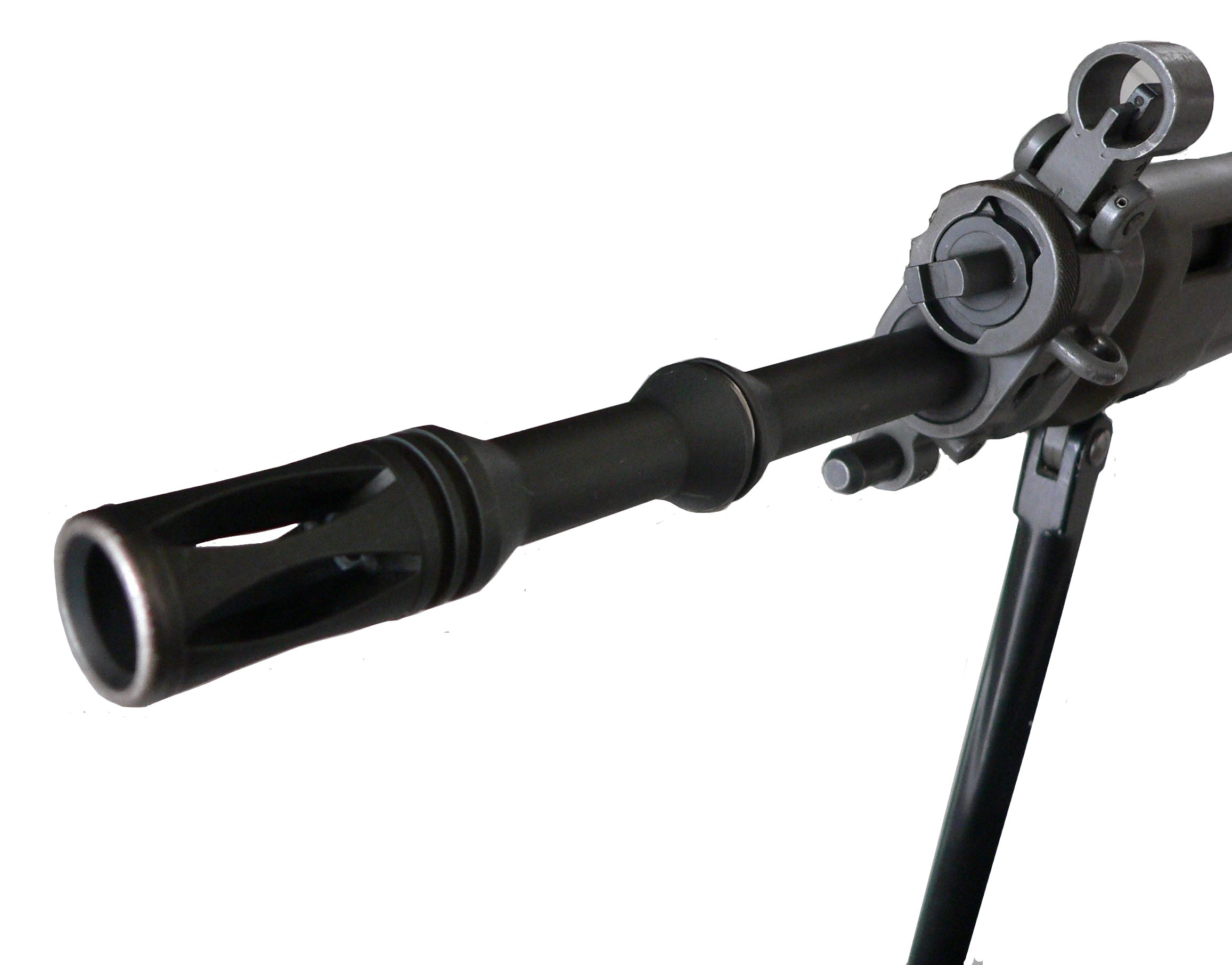
Detail of the birdcage-type flash suppressor on a SIG SG 550

A flash suppressor, also known as a flash guard, flash eliminator, flash hider, or flash cone, is a device attached to the muzzle of a rifle that reduces its visible signature while firing by cooling or dispersing the burning gases that exit the muzzle, a phenomenon typical of carbine-length weapons. Its primary intent is to reduce the chances that the shooter will be blinded in low-light shooting conditions. Contrary to popular belief, it is only a minor secondary benefit if a flash suppressor reduces the intensity of the flash visible to the enemy.

A flash suppressor is different from a muzzle brake, although they are typically mounted in the same position and sometimes confused with each other. While the former is intended to reduce visible flash, a muzzle brake is designed to reduce recoil inherent to large cartridges and typically does not reduce visible flash.

== Rationale ==
Pre-20th century rifle designs tended to have longer barrels than modern rifles. A beneficial side effect of the long barrel is that the propellant is completely burned before the bullet leaves the barrel, usually resulting only in a puff of smoke from the muzzle. However, if the same weapon's barrel is "cut down" (shortened), as is common in cavalry and jungle-combat adapted versions, the bullet would often leave the barrel before the powder was completely consumed, resulting in a bright flash from the muzzle.

When barrel lengths were dramatically decreased with the introduction of various shorter-barreled rifles and carbines, the flash became a serious problem during night-time combat, as the flash would impair the shooter's night vision and would also make the shooter's position more apparent. Originally limited to "special purpose" roles, it was now expected that all infantry weapons with shorter barrels would experience this problem, and thereby be of limited use in low-light situations. Flash suppressors became common on late-World War II and later assault rifle designs, and are almost universal on these weapons today. Some designs, such as those found on the AKS-74U, serve a dual role as a gas expansion chamber, helping the shortened weapon's gas system function properly.

Military flash suppressors are designed to reduce the muzzle flash from the weapon to preserve the shooter's night vision, usually by diverting the incandescent gases to the sides, away from the line of sight of the shooter, and to secondarily reduce the flash visible to the enemy. Military forces engaging in night combat are still visible when firing, especially with night vision gear, and must move quickly after firing to avoid receiving return fire.

Limiting the amount of powder to what the length of a barrel can burn is one possible solution, but differences between individual cartridges mean that some cartridges will always have too much powder to be completely consumed, and the reduced powder load produces a lower projectile velocity. Muzzle flash can be controlled by using cartridges with a faster-burning propellant, so that the propellant gases will already have begun to cool by the time they exit the barrel, reducing flash intensities. Faster-burning powders, however, produce less projectile velocity, which reduces the accuracy, due to introducing a more parabolic bullet flight path in place of a "flat" trajectory, while also reducing the lethality of the weapon by reducing the distance of the projectile's penetration of the target.

Flash suppressors reduce, or in some cases eliminate, the flash by rapidly cooling the gases as they leave the end of the barrel. Although the overall amount of burning propellant is unchanged, the density and temperature are greatly reduced, as is the brightness of the flash.

== Types ==
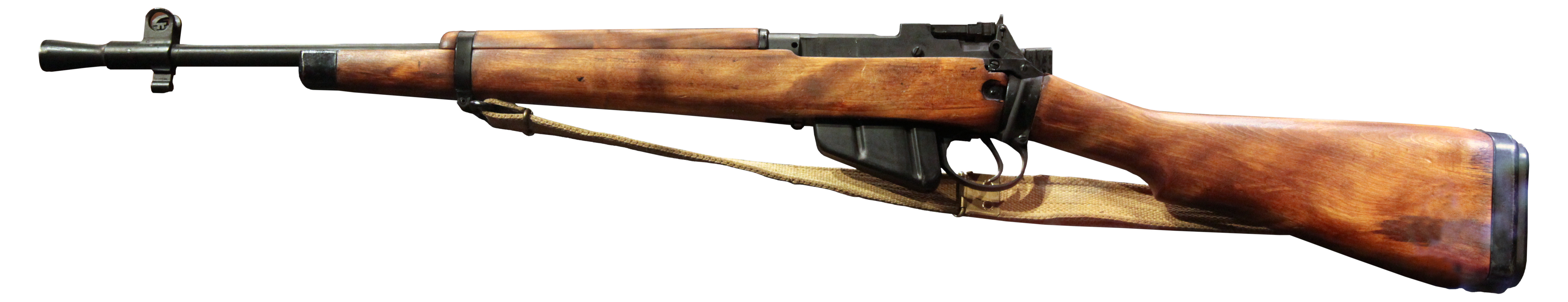
Rifle No 5 Mk I with cone-shaped flash suppressor

A number of different flash suppressing designs have been used over the years. The simplest is a cone placed on the end of the barrel, which was used on the late-World War II jungle-combat versions of the Lee–Enfield, the rifle No. 5 Mk I variant, intended for use in the Pacific (the jungles of Malaya). More modern solutions tend to use a "basket" with several slits or holes cut in it, as seen on the M16 and other small-bore weapons. Cone-shaped flash eliminators are also evident on the ZB vzor 26 machine gun, and on the turret-mounted aircraft machine guns of British WWII heavy bombers, which were used mostly at night.

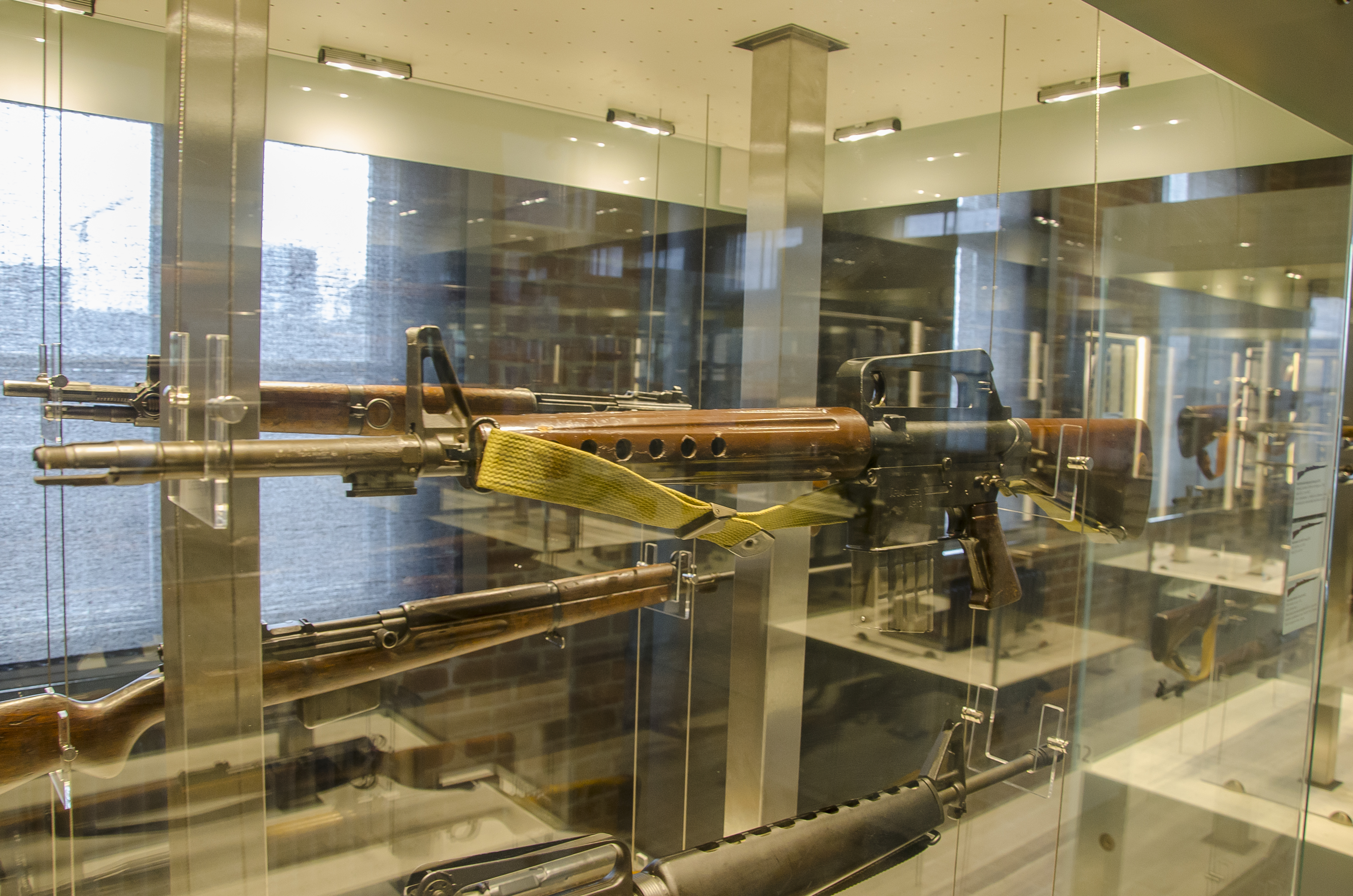
Sudanese Model Armalite AR-10 with a prong-type flash suppressor

Duckbill flash suppressors have upper and lower "prongs" and direct gases to the sides. Early M60 machine guns and some Armalite AR-10, Armalite AR-15, and early M16 models featured this type of flash suppressor. One disadvantage is that the prongs can become entangled with vines or other natural vegetation and objects in the field.

"Birdcage type" flash suppressors still have prongs, but feature a ring on the front to prevent vegetation entanglement between the prongs. The closed bottom port of the M16A2 design makes the device function as a compensator. Both designs require indexing with a crush washer, which increases the flash signature.

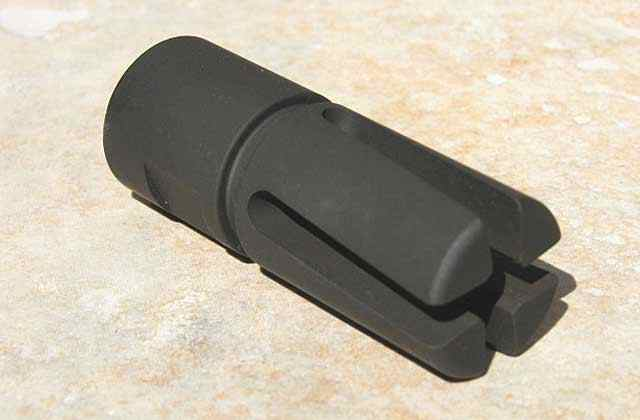
Vortex Flash Hider seen from the front

The Vortex Flash Hider is a design developed in 1984, with a patent secured in 1995. The Vortex is somewhat reminiscent of the original "three-prong flash hider" found on the original Vietnam-era M16. However, the Vortex is more robust and makes use of four solid tines, which are equally spaced and angled 6° from a centerline, while the slots of the body incorporate a 5-, 10-, and 15-degree twisted helix design, which eliminates up to 99% of visible muzzle flash by having the flash break up at multiple locations and angles.

The Noveske Rifleworks KX-3 is a flash suppressor intended for use on shorter barreled rifles and aids in reliability. The back pressure generated through this type of flash suppressor helps to cycle the rifle. Noveske patterned this design on the muzzle brake found on the Soviet AKS-74U carbine, where it was explicitly used for this purpose. Essentially, it is the cone-shaped suppressor of the AKS-74U within a chamber. Some other examples of cone-shaped hiders are found on the Bren machine gun, the .303 rifle No 5 Mk 1 "jungle carbine" and some models of the RPK and German MG3.

The XM177 Commando variant of the M16 rifle used a unique flash suppressor, sometimes called a flash or sound moderator, for its 10-inch barrel. This device is 4.2 inches long and was designed primarily as a counterbalance measure, as the shorter barrel made the weapon unwieldy. This device reduced flash signature greatly and sound signature slightly, making the normally louder short barreled rifle sound like a longer barreled M16A1. Unlike conventional suppressors, the XM177's moderator has no internal baffles and does not reduce the weapon's sound signature to subsonic levels; despite this, because it alters the sound level of the weapon, the United States Bureau of Alcohol, Tobacco, Firearms and Explosives has declared these moderators to be suppressors and regulates their civilian purchase in the United States.

There are also devices referred to as hybrids that function as both flash suppressors and muzzle rise/recoil compensators, such as the White Sound Defense FOSSA-556. The U.S. military A2 muzzle device is technically a hybrid device: it has vents that are biased upward to reduce muzzle rise.

== Legality ==
=== New Zealand ===
Flash suppressors are seen as a "military" feature, and semi-automatic long guns with flash suppressors were defined as Military-Style Semi-Automatics in 1992, requiring a permit. Such weapons have since been prohibited.

=== United States ===
Flash suppressors were seen as "military" features and were on the list of federally defined features that could cause a rifle to be defined as illegal if the lower receiver was manufactured after the effective date of the Federal Assault Weapons Ban that went into effect in 1994 in the United States. This ban expired in 2004, although some states, such as California, Massachusetts, Maryland, New York, and New Jersey, have similar bans in place restricting the use of flash suppressors.

=== Germany and Australia ===
Flash suppressors and muzzle brakes can be legally acquired and used on all types of firearms, unless they are designed to significantly or predominantly reduce the sound.

== See also ==
- Muzzle brake
- Sound suppressor
- Muzzle shroud
- Muzzle booster
