= Muzzle shroud =

Gunbarrel attachment protective against burns and blast waves

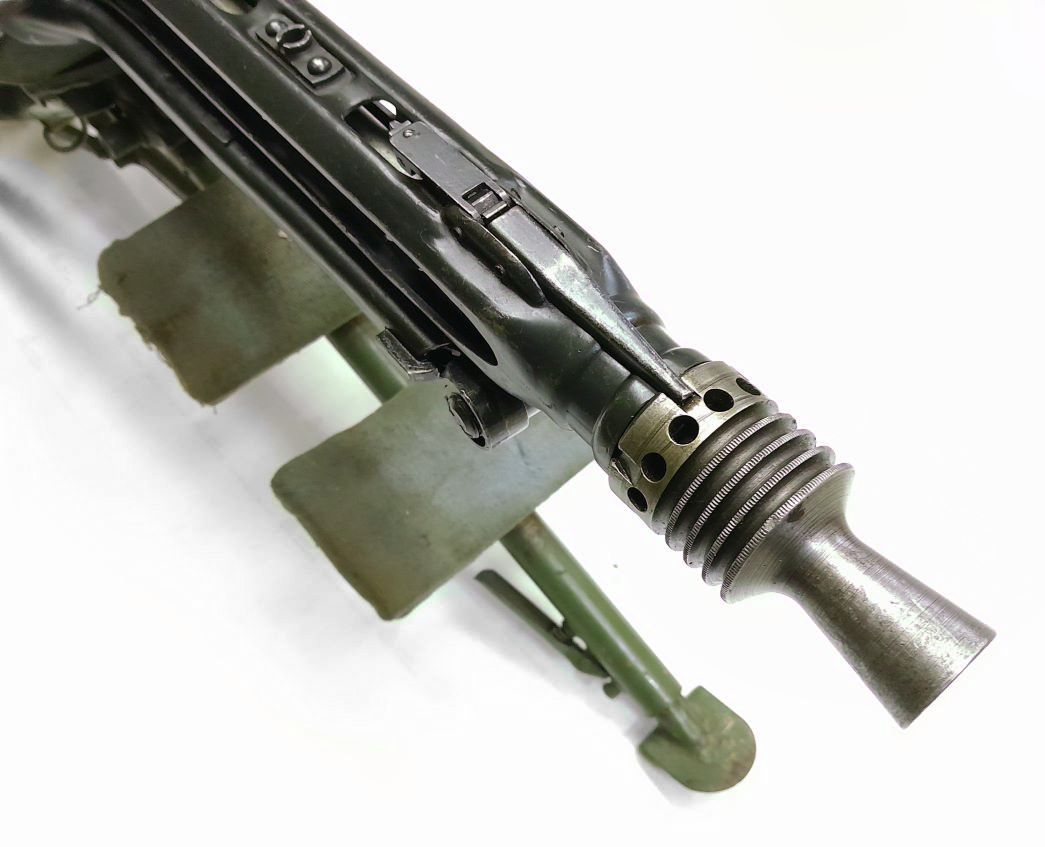
An MG-42 with a muzzle shroud

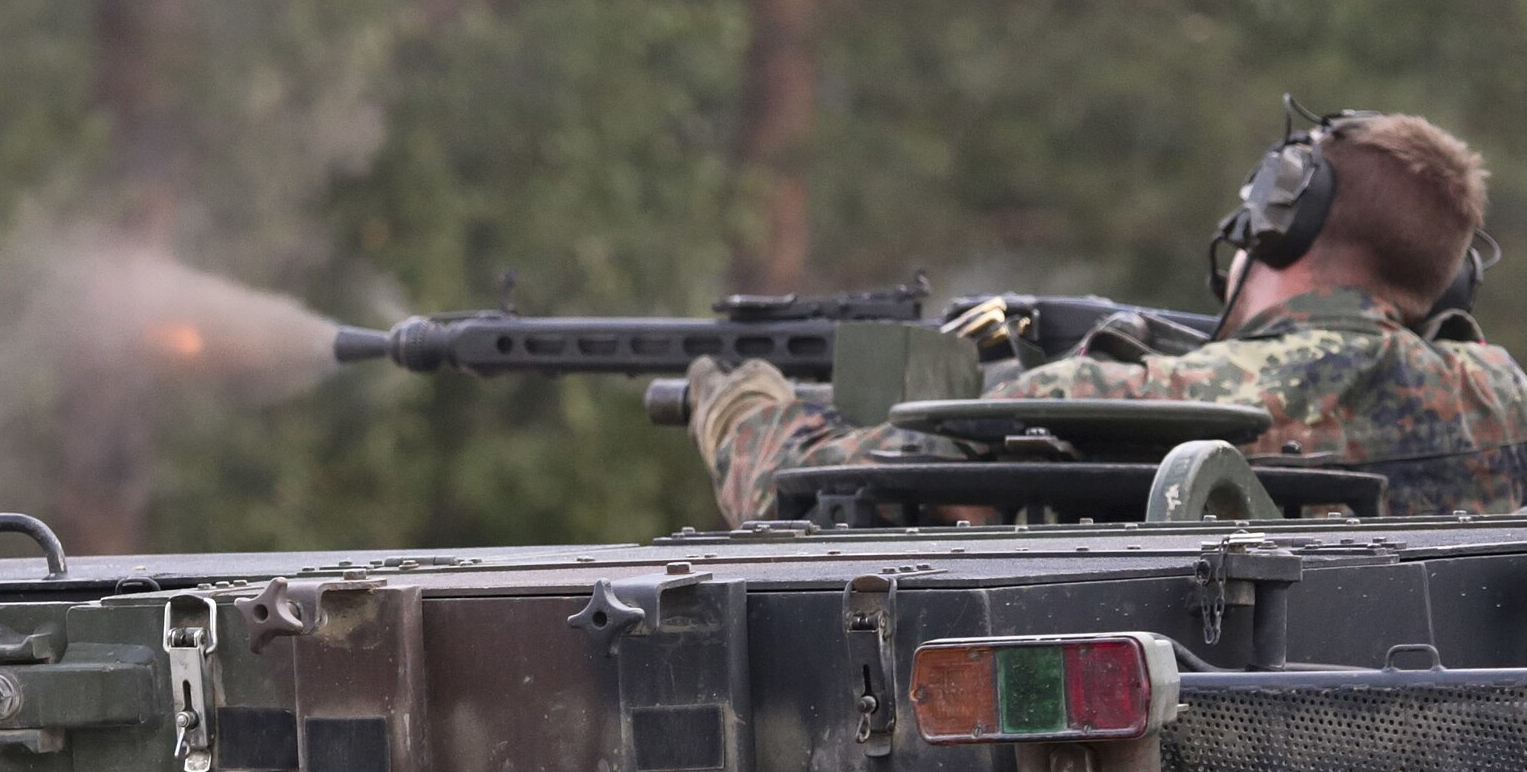
MG3 firing

A muzzle shroud, linear compensator, blast shield, forward blast diverter, or concussion reduction device (CRD) is a sleeve (either circular or otherwise) that attaches to and extends beyond the muzzle of a firearm in order to redirect some of the noise and concussion, or shock wave, from the muzzle blast forward and away from the anyone behind it (including the shooter) and to its sides.

A muzzle shroud is similar to a barrel shroud, with the difference that it only surrounds the far end of the barrel (muzzle). It can be a muzzle extension or muzzle device, and can also be considered a flash suppressor without circumferential openings.

A muzzle shroud differs from a silencer (sound suppressor) in that its primary function is not to suppress the sound, but merely redirect it so to increase the comfort of the shooter, reducing the concussion to a comfortable level.

Linear compensators are also a form of muzzle shroud. While most muzzle brakes redirect the gases to the side and rearward, most linear compensators redirect the gases forward. Linear compensators and suppressors do not have the disadvantages of a redirected muzzle blast; they actually reduce the blast by venting high pressure gas forward at reduced velocity.

A muzzle shroud can be used in conjunction with other muzzle devices (such as a muzzle brake, flash suppressor, or brake/suppressor hybrid device). This way the user can still benefit from some of the recoil reduction of a muzzle brake, but with less of the noise and concussion normally associated with such a device. However, depending on the design, the muzzle shroud will usually increase the recoil to some degree compared to using a muzzle brake only.

== Motivation ==
Even wearing double hearing protection (earplugs and muffs), some shooters have experienced hearing loss from high volume or long term shooting, probably due to the shockwaves from muzzle blasts propagating though the sinuses and facial bone structures. The noise levels experienced are often increased when firing indoor or in other confined spaces. Sound suppressors are increasingly commonly used by shooters to reduce the concussion and thereby prevent hearing loss, but are not always suitable for either legal or technical reasons. Suppressors can either be difficult or illegal to obtain in some jurisdictions, while a concussion reduction device is normally not classified as such. Concussion reduction devices also typically don't have the problem of introducing the extra amount of mirage as a suppressor does, since suppressors work by absorbing heat from the burnt gunpowder. The extra mirage can make accurate aiming difficult, especially on precision targets at long range.

A muzzle shroud can also increase comfort compared to a muzzle brake while shooting prone by preventing dust to kick up from the ground.

== Amount of noise reduction ==
Sound waves are semi-directional. They consist of both Point- and Line-wave propagation. The projectile emanates mostly line-propagation properties after leaving the barrel. At the moment that the projectile is exiting the barrel it produces a mainly point-biased wave generation. (This is largely due to the shock waves traveling forward along the interior of the barrel, thus preventing any backward travel from the projectile into the barrel.) Sound waves travel in an ever-expanding bubble emanating from the muzzle when the propellant gases are traveling at supersonic speeds. This is called the "muzzle blast." Except in extremely low pressure loads, the exiting propellant gasses generate much higher sound pressure levels (dBa) than any other aspect of the weapon firing. (e.g., hammer, sear, bolt, supersonic flight signature, etc.) The supersonic "ballistic crack" is typically 136-138 dB, whereas "muzzle blast" may reach 168 dB. By encircling the muzzle, the shroud funnels and focuses the sound waves along the projectile flight axis, away from the shooter. This alone can partially protect the shooter from 12 to 18 dB of blast returning to the shooter's ears.

An early example of muzzle device that predates this is the Colt Model 608 carbine intended for downed aircrew in hostile territory using a 3.5-inch (89 mm) long flash hider that dampened sound in order to draw less attention from enemy fire to an extent.

=== Blast deflector ===
Not a silencer as such but a device used to deflect the sound away from the user exists.

== Legality ==
=== United States ===
In the United States, the ATF has ruled that since the sound waves are not dampened and are metered at the same levels at two measuring points (1 m (3.3 ft) to the left and 0 m in front of the muzzle and 1 m (3.3 ft) left and 5 m (16 ft) forward of the muzzle) this is not a sound suppressing device. The only action which a muzzle shroud performs is shielding the area directly behind the muzzle from the worst blast pressures. Muzzle brakes direct the escaping gases rearward toward the shooter, thus increasing blast pressure directed toward the operator's ears. The same principle that lessens felt recoil also acts to enhance the sound levels reaching the shooter. Some of the muzzle brakes designed for heavy-caliber rifles (.338 Lapua, .408 CheyTac, .50 BMG) incorporate "blast shields" projecting laterally from the sides of the muzzle crown. These reflect sound waves traveling rearward via the muzzle brake blast chambers. These small leaves, however, do not fully enclose the muzzle diameter, and so block only the worst blast path, while allowing the majority of escaping gases to circumvent the shield by traveling around them, still reaching the shooter's ears, potentially causing hearing damage.

== Gallery ==
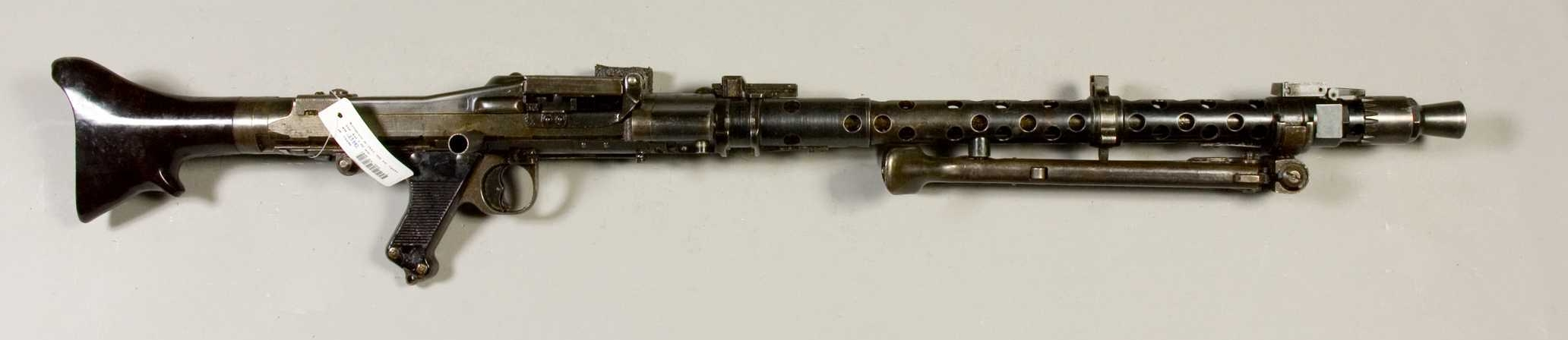
An MG 34 with a conical muzzle shroud

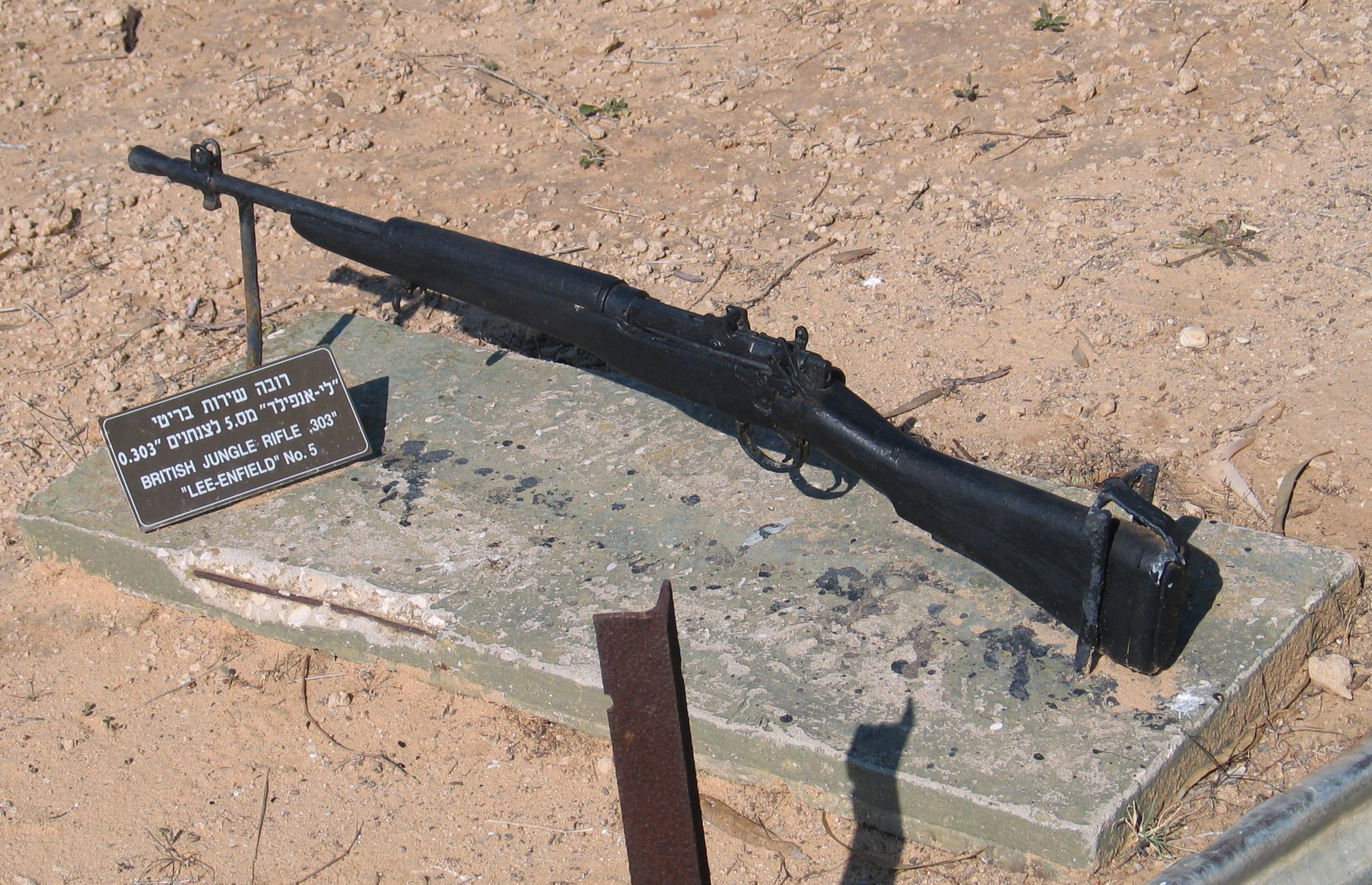
The Lee–Enfield jungle carbine (rifle No. 5 Mk I) with a conical flash suppressor (muzzle shroud)

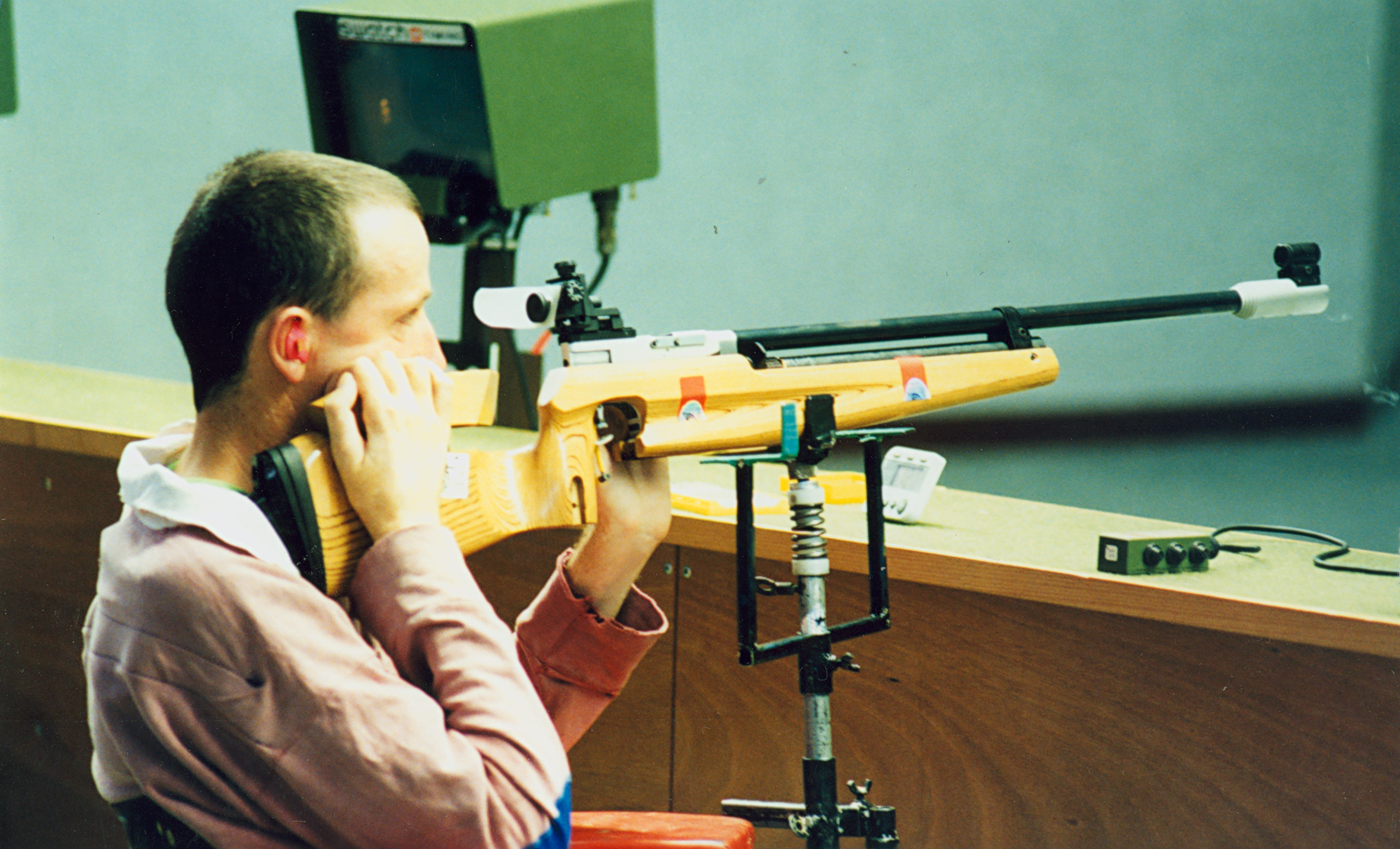
Front sight extensions on an ISSF air rifle are effectively muzzle shrouds used to increase the sight radius, aiding in precise aiming with iron sights.

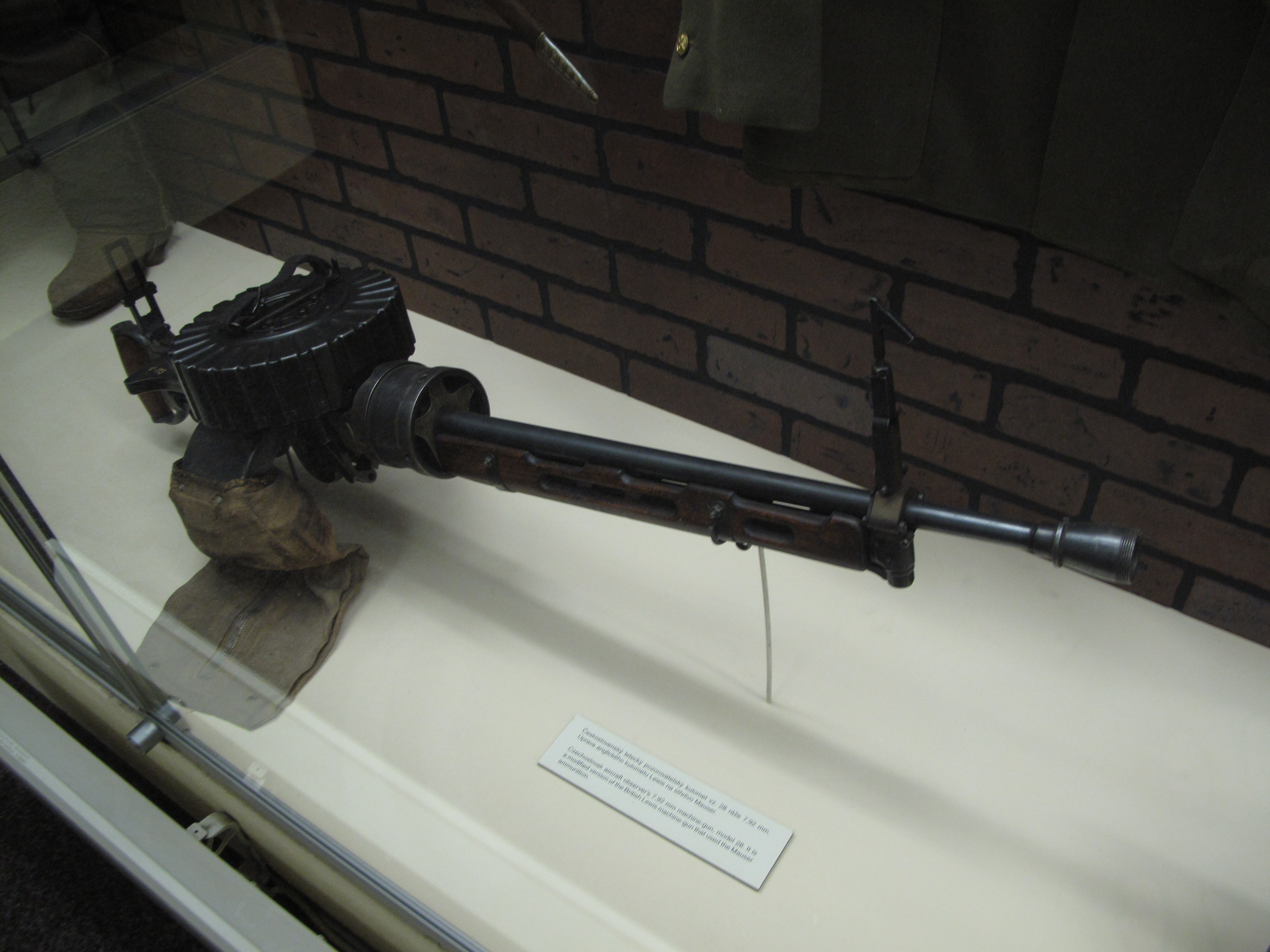
A Lewis gun with a muzzle shroud

== See also ==
- Muzzle booster
- Jet blast deflector
- Glossary of firearms terms
