= Nguyen v. Bonta =

2025 Ninth Circuit Second Amendment case

- Court: United States Court of Appeals for the Ninth Circuit
- Full case name: Michelle Nguyen, et al. v. Rob Bonta, Attorney General of California, et al.
- Decided: June 20, 2025
- Citation: No. 24-2036

Case history
- Prior actions: Summary judgment for plaintiffs, Nguyen v. Bonta, S.D. Cal. No. 3:20-cv-02470 (March 11, 2024)

Holding
- California Penal Code §27535, which limits the purchase of firearms to one within any 30-day period, is facially unconstitutional under the Second Amendment because possession of multiple firearms and the ability to acquire firearms through purchase without meaningful constraints are protected by the Second Amendment, and the law is not supported by the nation's historical tradition of firearm regulation.

Court membership
- Judges sitting: Danielle Forrest, Bridget Shelton Bade, John B. Owens

Keywords
- Second Amendment, Gun laws in California, Bruen

Nguyen v. Bonta, No. 24-2036 (9th Cir. 2025), is a decision of the United States Court of Appeals for the Ninth Circuit striking down California's "one-gun-a-month" firearm purchase restriction as facially unconstitutional under the Second Amendment. It was the first case in which the Ninth Circuit permanently struck down a firearms statute as violating the Second Amendment following the U.S. Supreme Court's decision in New York State Rifle & Pistol Association, Inc. v. Bruen (2022).

== Background ==
California Penal Code §27535 historically restricted purchases of concealable handguns to one per 30-day period. The restriction was extended to semi-automatic centerfire rifles effective July 1, 2021, and to all firearms — including completed frames, receivers, and firearm precursor parts — effective January 1, 2024.

The plaintiffs — individual firearm purchasers Michelle Nguyen, Dominic Boguski, Jay Medina, Frank Colletti, John Phillips, and Darin Prince; licensed firearms dealers PWGG, LP and North County Shooting Center, Inc.; and associational plaintiffs including the Firearms Policy Coalition, the Second Amendment Foundation, and the San Diego County Gun Owners Political Action Committee — filed suit in the United States District Court for the Southern District of California challenging §27535 as a violation of the Second Amendment.

== District court ==
On March 11, 2024, Judge William Q. Hayes granted summary judgment for the plaintiffs and permanently enjoined enforcement of §27535, holding that the restriction violates the Second Amendment as applied to handguns and semi-automatic centerfire rifles. California appealed to the Ninth Circuit, which initially stayed the district court's injunction pending appeal. The Ninth Circuit lifted the stay on August 15, 2024, following oral argument.

== Ninth Circuit opinion ==
On June 20, 2025, a unanimous three-judge panel of the Ninth Circuit affirmed the district court in a published opinion. The panel held that §27535 is facially unconstitutional because "possession of multiple firearms and the ability to acquire firearms through purchase without meaningful constraints are protected by the Second Amendment and California's law is not supported by our nation's tradition of firearms regulation."

Applying the framework set out in Bruen, the panel first concluded that the plain text of the Second Amendment covers the conduct regulated by §27535 — buying more than one firearm from a licensed dealer in a 30-day period — because the right to "keep and bear arms" necessarily includes the ability to acquire them. The panel then examined California's proffered historical analogues and found none sufficiently similar in "how" and "why" they burdened the right to satisfy the historical-tradition test.

== Aftermath ==
The mandate issued in August 2025. In response to the ruling, the California Legislature passed Assembly Bill 1078 (Chapter 570, Statutes of 2025), signed by Governor Gavin Newsom on October 10, 2025, which amended §27535 to raise the 30-day purchase limit from one firearm to three, effective April 1, 2026.

== See also ==
- Gun laws in California
- Duncan v. Bonta
- Miller v. Bonta
- New York State Rifle & Pistol Association, Inc. v. Bruen
