= Gun laws in California =

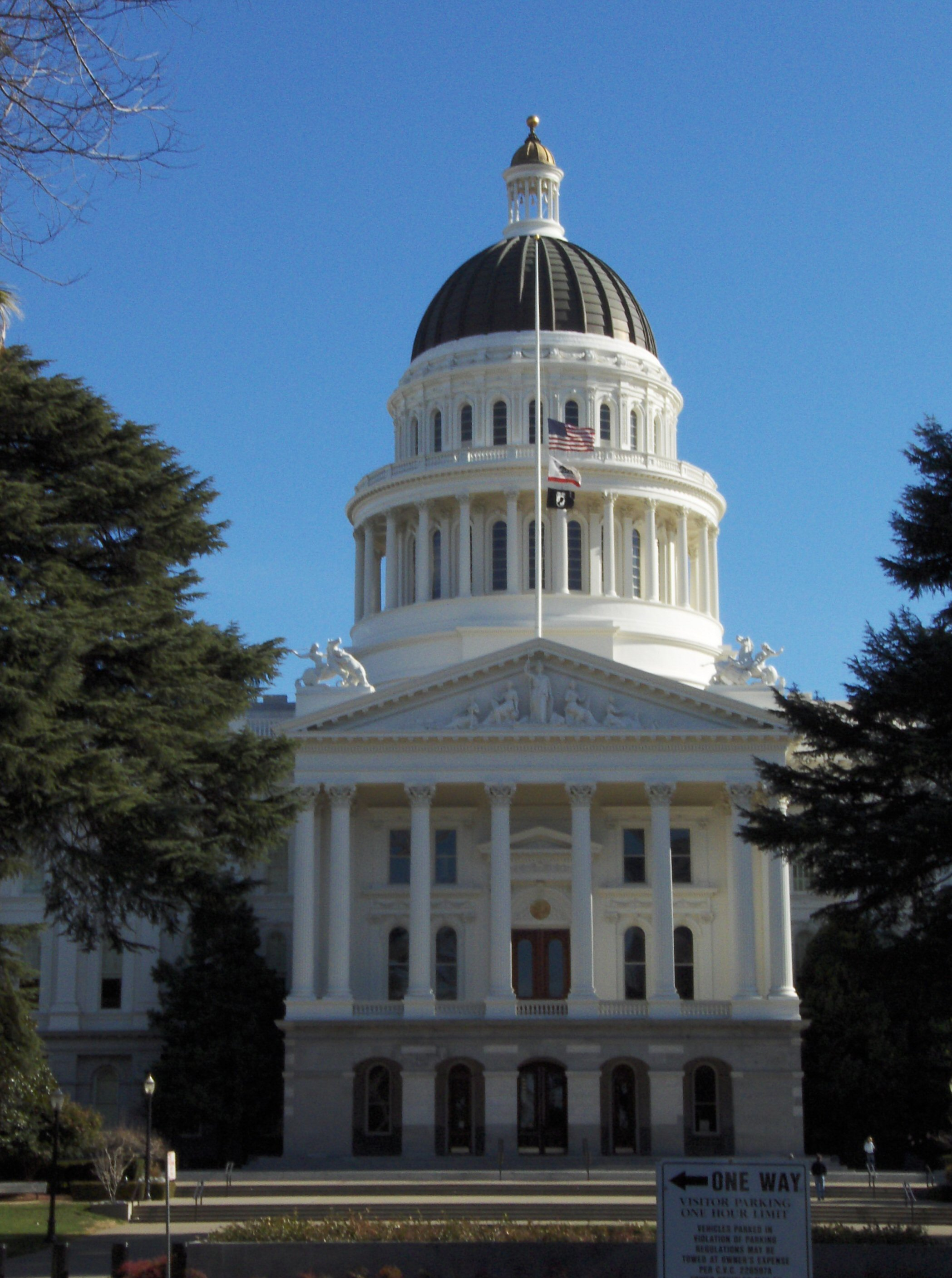
The California State Capitol in Sacramento, where California's firearm statutes are enacted

Gun laws in California regulate the sale, possession, and use of firearms and ammunition in the state of California in the United States. The gun laws of California are widely regarded as among the most restrictive in the United States.

A buyer of any firearm must hold a five-year Firearm Safety Certificate, obtained by paying a $25 fee and passing a written test proctored by a DOJ Certified Instructor. New handguns sold by dealers must appear on the state's Roster of Handguns Certified for Sale; the roster's requirements have grown steadily more stringent, and a 2013 federal civil rights lawsuit alleged the newer regulations amounted to a de facto ban on new handgun models. Private sales must go through a licensed dealer, every transfer is recorded by the state, and all firearm purchases are subject to a ten-day waiting period.

Unlike most other states, California has no provision in its constitution that explicitly guarantees an individual right to keep and bear arms, and the California Supreme Court has largely upheld the state's restrictions on that basis. The U.S. Supreme Court's decisions in Heller (2008) and McDonald (2010) applied the Second Amendment to the states, however, and New York State Rifle & Pistol Association, Inc. v. Bruen (2022) has since produced a sustained wave of federal-court challenges to California statutes on carry, sensitive places, purchase quantity, and the handgun roster. California law also heavily restricts other items regarded as dangerous weapons, including certain knives, swords, clubs, explosives, fireworks, bows and arrows, slingshots, spears, and nunchucks.

Semi-automatic firearms that the state has classified as assault weapons, .50 BMG caliber rifles, and large-capacity magazines (magazines that can hold more than ten rounds of ammunition) may not be sold in California. The ban on large-capacity magazines was ruled unconstitutional March 29, 2019 but the ruling was put on hold while the case was under appeal. On August 14, 2020, a three-judge panel of the United States Court of Appeals for the Ninth Circuit ruled that the ban was unconstitutional. However, this decision was vacated by the Ninth Circuit Court on February 25, 2021, until the case can be reheard en banc. On June 4, 2021, Roger Benitez, a senior judge of the Southern District of California, ruled the assault weapons ban unconstitutional, though he permitted a 30-day stay of appeal. The Ninth Circuit Court of Appeals subsequently extended the stay indefinitely. Possession of automatic firearms, and of short-barreled shotguns and rifles, is prohibited without a Dangerous Weapons Permit, that is received from the California Department of Justice pending a good reason for their possession such as: manufacture, repair, collecting in limited cases (pre-1990), movie prop guns or dealing to police/military. California Penal Code §25850 defines what constitutes a loaded weapon.

California is a "shall-issue" state for concealed carry permits after a 2022 Supreme Court ruling that eliminated the "good cause" requirement. This means that if the applicant meets the eligibility requirements, the sheriff's office or police chief is required to issue a license, although they can still impose some restrictions. Additionally, the issuing authority can also impose restrictions on the CCW permit-holder, such as limiting concealed carry only to the purposes listed on the approved CCW permit application. However, concealed carry permits are valid statewide, regardless of where they were issued. This creates a situation where residents in presumptively No Issue locations such as Los Angeles and San Francisco cannot lawfully carry a concealed firearm, but residents from other counties with more permissive CCW issuance policies can lawfully carry within these same jurisdictions. California does not recognize concealed carry permits issued by other states, and non-residents are generally forbidden from obtaining a California concealed carry permit. Those eligible to carry a rifle, shotgun, or handgun under the federal Law Enforcement Officers Safety Act are not subject to some California laws.

California has state preemption for many, but not all, firearms laws. Actual enforcement of California's firearms laws also varies widely across the state. Urban areas, such as the San Francisco and Los Angeles metropolitan areas strictly enforce firearms laws, and some communities within these areas have passed local ordinances that make legally owning a firearm difficult. Meanwhile, some rural jurisdictions narrowly enforce the same firearms laws by prosecuting only those who demonstrate malicious intent or by not enforcing portions of the state's firearms laws at all. State law enforcement agencies, such as the California Highway Patrol, the California Department of Justice, and the California Department of Fish and Game, strictly enforce state firearms law everywhere in California.

== Key events ==
| Year | Event | Description |
|---|---|---|
| 1989 | Roberti–Roos Assault Weapons Control Act | Defines certain semiautomatic firearms as assault weapons and bans their ownership and transfer |
| 2001 | Unsafe Handgun Act | Prohibits dealers from selling any new handgun unless it is listed in the state Department of Justice roster of handguns certified for sale |
| 2016 | Proposition 63 | Ballot measure approved by voters that outlaws the possession of magazines holding more than 10 rounds, requires background checks for all ammunition sales, and mandates the reporting of lost or stolen firearms |
| 2022 | New York State Rifle & Pistol Ass'n v. Bruen | U.S. Supreme Court decision holding that "proper cause" requirements for concealed carry permits violate the Second Amendment and that gun regulations must be consistent with the nation's historical tradition of firearm regulation. |
| 2023 | Senate Bill 2 | Designated a wide range of locations as sensitive places where concealed carry is prohibited |
| 2025 | Nguyen v. Bonta | Ninth Circuit affirmed the district court, striking down California's one-firearm-per-30-days purchase limit as applied to handguns and semi-automatic centerfire rifles. |
| 2026 | Assembly Bill 1078 | Raised the 30-day purchase limit from one firearm to three |

== Summary table ==
| Subject / law | Long guns | Handguns | Relevant statutes (Penal Code except when noted) | Notes |
|---|---|---|---|---|
| State permit required to purchase? | Partial | Partial | §26500 | All firearm sales must be completed through a dealer. Firearm purchases require a Firearm Safety Certificate and proof of residency unless the individual purchasing the firearm is active duty military, honorably retired military, or a peace officer under Penal Code Section 830. Military reservists must provide proof of residency in order to purchase a firearm. The Firearms Safety Certificate can be purchased and completed at firearms dealers with DOJ instructors on the same day, differentiating it from a FOID or FID card system where one has to apply with the local police and await approval. Must be 21 to purchase any firearm. |
| Firearm registration? | Yes | Yes | §28150 | The California Department of Justice ("DOJ") retains information about the purchaser and seller of all in-state firearm sales and transfers, and requires that any firearms imported into the state be reported to the DOJ. Furthermore, the Attorney General is required by law to maintain a registry containing the fingerprints and identifying information of the transferee, and the unique identifying information of every firearm transferred in the state, pursuant to §11106. All handgun serial numbers and sales are recorded by the state in the Department of Justice's Automated Firearms System, along with those of many long guns. While there is no requirement for California residents to register handguns owned prior to 1991 with law enforcement, §12025 and §12031 enhance several misdemeanor offenses to felonies if the handgun is not on file in the Department of Justice's Automated Firearms System. New residents must file a New Resident Report of Firearm Ownership with DOJ within 60 days for all firearms brought into the state, not only handguns (PC §27560). As of January 1, 2014, long gun serial numbers are also recorded, whereas previously only the sale was recorded. However, it is not required that owners of long guns purchased prior to 2014 register their firearms and it is not a crime to be in possession of an unregistered firearm. |
| Owner license required? | No | No | None | While the Firearm Safety Certificate (FSC) is required for new purchases of firearms, ongoing possession of a firearm does not require a license or permit. People moving into California are required, within 60 days, to file a New Resident Report of Firearm Ownership. New residents are prohibited from importing assault weapons or any other weapons prohibited by California law regardless of whether they were lawfully acquired and possessed in the residents' prior state of residence. The ban on importing large-capacity magazines was ruled unconstitutional but the ruling is on hold while the case is under appeal. |
| Assault weapon law? | Yes | Yes | §30500, §30515 | Illegal to possess, import, or purchase assault weapons and .50 BMG rifles, unless such weapons were acquired by the owner prior to June 1, 1989. While California's Assault Weapons Law does allow individuals who hold a Dangerous Weapons Permit to obtain, transport or possess defined assault weapons, the DOJ generally does not issue Dangerous Weapons Permits to ordinary citizens. Legally defined assault weapons and .50 BMG rifles listed by make and model by the DOJ must be registered. Their sale and transfer is prohibited. Military look-alike rifles that are not chambered for .50 BMG and are not on the DOJ roster are legal to purchase or possess, with some restrictions in configuration – known as "banned features". Any active duty military personnel may apply for a Department of Justice (DOJ) Assault Weapon Permit to use personal assault weapons in military sanctioned activities during the course of permanent stationing in the State of California while on active military duty. The firearms must be registered with the California Department of Justice prior to the servicemember's arrival in California by submitting the registration form with a copy of the member's Permanent Change of Station (PCS) orders and an authorization letter from the installation commander. With the passage of Senate Bill 880 and Assembly Bill 1135 in June 2016, the state's assault weapon ban has been expanded to include all semi-automatic center-fire rifles and shotguns that have a "bullet button" detachable magazine; effectively repealing a prior law that made "bullet button" magazines required on all newly manufactured weapons with detachable magazines. The sale or transfer of such weapons will be prohibited, effective January 1, 2017. Those purchased prior to January 1, 2017 must be registered with the DOJ by the start of 2018. The definition of types of weapons that are banned has been expanded, the exact definitions should be reviewed at the California DOJ website. |
| Magazine capacity restriction? | Yes | Yes | §32310 | Section 32310 of the Penal Code states that any person who manufactures or causes to be manufactured, imports into the state, keeps for sale, or offers or exposes for sale, or who gives, lends, buys, receives, or assembles any large-capacity magazine from a parts kit is punishable by imprisonment in a county jail not exceeding one year or imprisonment. Thus, the offenses listed can be charged as a felony or a misdemeanor at the discretion of the prosecutor. Large-capacity is defined as being able to hold more than 10 rounds. In November 2016 California voters approved Proposition 63. The referendum outlaws the possession of such magazines, requires background checks for all ammunition sales and mandates the reporting of lost or stolen firearms. Under Proposition 63, any person who possesses a large-capacity magazine is guilty of an infraction punishable by a fine not to exceed one hundred dollars ($100) per large-capacity magazine, or is guilty of a misdemeanor punishable by a fine not to exceed one hundred dollars ($100) per large-capacity magazine, by imprisonment in a county jail not to exceed one year, or by both that fine and imprisonment.This prohibition applies to magazines acquired prior to January 1, 2000 that were previously considered "grandfathered." Importation, manufacture, lending, assembling a large-capacity magazine from a parts kit, or buying a large-capacity magazine remains chargeable as a felony or a misdemeanor. On June 29, 2017, a federal judge blocked the enforcement of Proposition 63's ban on the possession of large-capacity magazines, pending the outcome of litigation concerning the ban. Magazines that would have been subject to the Proposition 63 ban are legal for private citizens to keep until the injunction is either lifted and/or the ban is upheld by the courts. On March 29, 2019, the entire large-capacity magazine law was blocked permanently by the district court; this includes the ban on possession, in addition to the ban on manufacturing, importing, selling, etc. Following a stay request from Attorney General, Judge Benitez allowed the ban on manufacture, import, and sale of large-capacity magazines to be enforced while keeping in place the injunction against the enforcement of the ban on possession of previously legal large-capacity magazines, including all purchases made between the entry of the Court’s injunction on March 29, 2019 and April 5, 2019, 5:00 p.m. On August 14, 2020, a 9th circuit court ruled the ban on high capacity magazines unconstitutional. "Gun owners cannot immediately rush to buy high-capacity magazines because a stay issued by the lower court judge remains in place," according to the Associated Press. However, this decision was vacated by the Circuit Court on February 25, 2021 until the case can be reheard. Duncan v. Bonta was heard en banc by the Ninth Circuit Court on June 22, 2021. The en banc Court overturned the lower appellate panel in its ruling, holding that California's regulation of firearms did not violate the 2nd Amendment. |
| License required for concealed carry? | N/A | Yes | §26150 | "Shall issue," per Attorney General's directive after the Supreme Court's decision in New York State Rifle & Pistol Association, Inc. v. Bruen eliminated the "good cause" requirement. CCW permits valid statewide. Out-of-state permits not valid in California. On December 4, 2023, a lawsuit challenging California's laws forbidding nonresidents' concealed carry permits and nonresidents from obtaining California's CCW permit got filed. Penal Code §26045 provides an affirmative defense only to §25850 (carrying a loaded firearm), and only where the carry "would otherwise be lawful" — it does not authorize concealed carry without a permit under §25400. |
| Open carry allowed? | Partial | Partial | §26350 | Long guns and handguns may be openly carried in unincorporated rural areas where firearm discharge is not prohibited by local ordinance. In a county with a population of less than 200,000 residents, a permit to carry a handgun "loaded and exposed" may be issued by the county sheriff, valid only in the issuing county. A person may also open carry if he or she "reasonably believes that any person or the property of any person is in immediate, grave danger and that the carrying of the weapon is necessary for the preservation of that person or property." |
| Vehicle carry? | No | Yes | §25610 | A valid California Concealed Weapons License is required to carry a concealed handgun in a motor vehicle. Otherwise, handguns and assault weapons must be unloaded and in a locked container during transport; per PC §25610, the trunk qualifies as a locked container, but the glove compartment and utility/console boxes do not. Long guns not classified as assault weapons may be transported in a vehicle without being locked in a case, but must be unloaded. |
| State preemption of local restrictions? | Yes | Yes | §53701 Government Code | Most but not all local restrictions preempted. |
| Castle doctrine law? | Yes | Yes | | California never requires a duty to retreat whether in one's own home or not. The state acknowledges a legal presumption that an intruder poses a deadly threat if in one's own home or property that is owned and controlled by oneself. |
| NFA weapons restricted? | Yes | Yes | §12220, §12020, §12020 §18710, §32625, §33215, §33410 | Possession of automatic weapons or short-barreled shotguns or rifles prohibited without DOJ "Dangerous Weapons Permit"; permission rarely granted outside of film industry. Suppressors (aka silencers) prohibited under §33410 except by DOJ Dangerous Weapons Permit, which is generally issued only to a narrow class of holders (e.g., certain licensed manufacturers, film-industry armorers). Destructive devices are prohibited unless are designated as curios & relics, in which case a collectors permit can be obtained. The only AOWs that are permitted are smoothbore pistols and firearms with a combination of a smoothbore and rifle barrel. C&R short-barreled rifles and C&R short-barrled shotguns permitted. |
| Peaceable journey laws? | No | No | | California courts have ruled that large-capacity magazines (LCM) that are disassembled or LCM parts are legal to possess. Otherwise federal rules are observed. |
| Waiting period? | Yes | Yes | §26815(a), §26950-27140 , §27540(a) , §27600-27750 | California has a ten (10) day waiting period for all firearm purchases, transfers, and private sales which must be conducted through a federal and state firearm license holder. That is, upon purchase, the purchaser must wait 10 days after the purchase before the firearm is released to the owner. On August 25, 2014, the California's 10-day waiting period for gun purchases was ruled unconstitutional by the U.S. District Court for the Eastern District of California which found that "the 10-day waiting periods of Penal Code [sections 26815(a) and 27540(a)] violate the Second Amendment" as applied to members of certain classifications (notably holders of concealed carry permits) and "burdens the Second Amendment rights of the Plaintiffs". On December 14, 2016 this ruling was overturned by a three-judge panel of the 9th U.S. Circuit Court of Appeals. The plaintiffs' petition for an en banc rehearing was denied April 4, 2017; on February 20, 2018 the Supreme Court certiorari petition was denied, meaning that the waiting period remains in effect. On May 1, 2023, a new lawsuit challenging the ten-day waiting period was filed. |
| Background checks required for private sales? | Yes | Yes | § 27545 | Private party transfers of firearms must be conducted through a licensed dealer, who is required by federal law to conduct a background check and keep a record of the sale. |
| Red flag law? | Yes | Yes | | The police or a person's family member can ask a judge to confiscate the firearms of a person who appears to pose a threat to themselves or others for up to one year. Such orders from out-of-state are also recognized. As of September 1, 2020, eligible petitioners will be expanded to include an employer, coworker, and school teacher or employee, and the maximum allowable duration will be extended to 5 years. |
| Background check required for ammunition purchase? | Yes | Yes | PC 30312, 30314, 30342, 30370 | After January 1, 2018 all ammunition purchases must be made through a licensed ammunition dealer and no person may import ammunition from out-of-state unless they meet the requirements for exemption under PC 30314(b). This section effectively banned online and mail order sales of ammunition by requiring all transactions go through a storefront physically located inside California. Importing ammunition in violation of this section is an infraction for the first offense and a misdemeanor or infraction for any subsequent offenses. After July 1, 2019, all purchases of ammunition are required to have an "ammunition purchase authorization" from the California DOJ. This section requires the ammunition purchaser to submit to a background check and to have an entry in the California DOJ Automated Firearms System that matches the information presented at the time of purchase. Selling or delivering ammunition to a person without first receiving the "ammunition purchase authorization" is a misdemeanor. Background check was struck down by judge in Jan 2024. However, the 9th Circuit granted a stay to his injunction. |
| Home-built firearms restriction? | Yes | Yes | PC 29180, 29010 | After July 1, 2018, any person who wishes to manufacture a firearm must first apply to the California DOJ for a serial number and apply that serial number, once issued, to the firearm within 10 days. There are specific requirements laid out for how to inscribe or engrave the serial number given the material the firearm is made out of. Violation of this provision is a misdemeanor punishable by up to 1 year in the county jail for home-built handguns and 6 months in the county jail for any other home-built firearm. In June 2022, California passed AB 1621, which bans the use of CNC milling machines for self-manufacturing firearms. On September 26, 2023, the restrictions were expanded to forbid people without a license to have 3-D printers "that has the sole or primary function of manufacturing firearms", and to allow civil actions against people who distribute "any code or digital instructions to a specified person for the manufacture of a firearm using a three-dimensional printer or CNC milling machine." Starting January 1, 2024, a person cannot manufacture more than 3 firearms within the state in a calendar year without a license. |
| Purchase quantity and frequency restriction? | Yes | Yes | PC 27535 | As of January 1, 2024, no person is allowed to purchase more than one firearm, which includes completed frames and receivers and firearm precursor parts, within any 30-day period. Starting January 1, 2025, all private party transactions except with some exemptions will be subject to the 1-in-30 restriction. On March 11, 2024, Judge William Q. Hayes declared that the 1-in-30 law as applied to handguns and semi-automatic centerfire rifles violates the Second Amendment. The Ninth Circuit lifted its stay of the district court's injunction on August 15, 2024, and on June 20, 2025 a unanimous panel affirmed the district court in a published opinion. In response, the California Legislature passed Assembly Bill 1078 (Chapter 570, Statutes of 2025), signed by Governor Gavin Newsom on October 10, 2025, which raised the 30-day purchase limit from one firearm to three, effective April 1, 2026. |
| Transfer quantity and frequency restriction? | Yes | Yes | PC 16730 | As of January 1, 2020, no person without a license is allowed to make 6 or more firearm transactions (sale, lease, or transfer) per calendar year, regardless of the type of firearm, and no person is allowed to sell, lease, or transfer more than 50 total firearms per calendar year within those transactions. |

== State constitutional provisions ==
The Constitution of California does not contain a provision explicitly guaranteeing an individual right to keep and bear arms. Article 1, Section 1, of the California Constitution implies a right to self-defense (without specifically mentioning a right to keep and bear arms) and defense of property, by stating, "All people are by nature free and independent and have inalienable rights. Among these are enjoying and defending life and liberty, acquiring, possessing, and protecting property, and pursuing and obtaining safety, happiness, and privacy."

== Preemption ==
California law (§53071 GC) prohibits county and city authorities from enacting regulations regarding the registration or licensing of firearms. This provides for uniform firearm laws and prevents situations found in other states (such as New York) where traveling with an otherwise legal firearm could put a citizen at risk of violating local city ordinances.

Because of their inability to regulate firearms directly, some cities, such as Los Angeles, have prohibited residents from possessing a handgun or rifle magazine that fit more than 10 rounds, require firearms be stored in locked containers or with trigger locks installed when not in use, and have enacted ammunition regulations. Many jurisdictions have enacted ordinances restricting or banning the discharge of firearms and use zoning laws to impose significant restrictions to the establishment of gun stores and shooting ranges within their boundaries.

== Firearm sales ==
Due to one of California's earliest gun-control bills passed in 1923, gun sellers may not advertise the sale of handguns on their property. However this law was declared unconstitutional in September 2018.

The buyer of a firearm must fill out an application to purchase a particular gun. The firearms dealer electronically submits the application to the California Department of Justice (DOJ), which performs a background check on the buyer. The approved application is valid for 30 days. There is a 10-day waiting period for the delivery of any firearm. The buyer must pick up the firearm within 30 days of the original submission of paperwork (if approved), or he or she will have to have a dealer resubmit the paperwork and another 10-day waiting period starts.

Sales of firearms from one person to another (private party transfers) must be through a licensed firearms dealer using a Private Party Transfer form. The licensed dealer may charge a $10 fee, in addition to the $37.19 transfer fee that the state charges. Any number of firearms may be transferred at one time using this method. The dealer submits a Dealer's Record of Sale (DROS) form to the state, and the purchaser must wait 10 days before picking up the guns.

Historically, handgun purchases were limited to one per 30-day period, with exceptions for private party transfers and Certificate of Eligibility (COE) holders. The restriction was extended to semi-automatic centerfire rifles effective July 1, 2021, and to all firearms effective January 1, 2024. On March 11, 2024, in Nguyen v. Bonta, Judge William Q. Hayes of the Southern District of California ruled the restriction unconstitutional. The Ninth Circuit lifted its stay of that injunction on August 15, 2024, and on June 20, 2025 a unanimous Ninth Circuit panel affirmed the district court, holding that Penal Code §27535 "meaningfully constrains" the Second Amendment right to acquire firearms and is not supported by the historical tradition of firearm regulation. The mandate issued in August 2025. In response, the California Legislature passed Assembly Bill 1078 (Chapter 570, Statutes of 2025), signed by Governor Gavin Newsom in October 2025, which amended §27535 to raise the 30-day purchase limit from one firearm to three, effective April 1, 2026. Since April 1, 2026, a Californian may apply to purchase up to three firearms — including completed frames, receivers, and firearm precursor parts — within any rolling 30-day window. To purchase any firearm, a buyer must have a Firearm Safety Certificate (FSC), which replaced the Handgun Safety Certificate effective January 1, 2015. This is obtained by passing a written test, given by a Department of Justice certified instructor, on the safe and legal use of handguns. The certificate is valid for five years. A buyer must also perform a Safe Handling Demonstration when taking possession of a handgun. Some individuals are exempt from the Safety Certificate and Handling Demonstration requirements, including active and retired military and law enforcement personnel, hunter safety certificate holders, and concealed carry license holders. As of July 1, 2021, purchasing semiautomatic centerfire rifles will also be limited to one per 30-day period.

Effective January 1, 2015, the Handgun Safety Certificate program was replaced with the Firearm Safety Certificate (FSC) program. Under the FSC program, requirements that previously applied to handguns only now apply to all firearms (handguns and long guns), unless exempt. A valid Handgun Safety Certificate can still be used to purchase/acquire handguns only until it expires. For long gun purchases/acquisitions made January 1, 2015, and thereafter, an FSC will be required. Once an FSC is obtained, it can be used for both handgun and long gun purchases/acquisitions.

Residents of California purchasing long guns in other states are subject to the same requirements as for purchasing firearms in-state, if the buyer returns to California with the weapons in possession. For example, a California resident who purchases a long gun in Nevada would be required to go through a registered FFL in Nevada to have the weapon shipped to an FFL in California, who would then complete the DROS and administer the 10-day waiting period. However, a California resident would not be subject to California law for long guns purchased out-of-state and are never brought into California. In other words, a California resident who purchases a long gun in Nevada and stores the weapon at the home of a family member or friend in Nevada, would not be violating California law, as long as the weapon never enters the state. Such would also be the case for a California resident purchasing a California-defined assault weapon in another state where such weapons are legal, and the weapon is never brought into California. The California Department of Justice has been known to conduct sting operations by sending undercover agents to gun stores and gun shows in neighboring states to observe California residents purchasing firearms at such venues, and then tracking buyers back into California, where they are then arrested and prosecuted. The differences in gun laws and gun control philosophy between California and neighboring states has been a source of heated arguments between political figures in California who mostly support strict limitations on gun ownership and usage, and politicians in Arizona and Nevada who mostly favor individual gun rights.

Effective July 1, 2024, all firearms and ammunition will be subject to the 11% tax on dealers due to AB 28, which was signed into law on September 26, 2023.

Starting July 1, 2024, all payment card networks need to have created a merchant category code (MCC) for firearms and ammunition businesses. Starting May 1, 2025, all merchant acquirers are required to assign firearms merchants their MCCs.

=== Roster of handguns certified for sale ===
Under the Unsafe Handgun Act, dealers may not sell any new handgun unless it is listed in the state Department of Justice roster of handguns certified for sale. Listed handguns must include certain mechanical features and pass a set of laboratory tests (handguns on the roster that previously did not have such features are still allowed to be sold and hence are grandfathered into the roster). Private party transfers, curio/relic handguns, certain single-action revolvers, and pawn/consignment returns are exempt from this requirement. Sale to law enforcement personnel are exempt from list restrictions.

Handguns which were legally owned and registered before the roster's implementation in 2001, or which were taken off the roster (or discontinued) after their legal purchase and registration, can legally be sold in a private transfer as long as it is done through an FFL in accordance with state law.

Since private transfers (conducted through an FFL in accordance with state law) are exempted from the roster, there have been instances of law enforcement officers purchasing off-roster handguns and then re-selling them (typically at a premium) to regular buyers. This practice has led to occasional criminal convictions of officers who were found to be doing so repeatedly.

On March 20, 2023, Judge Cormac J. Carney in Boland v. Bonta granted a preliminary injunction against requiring mechanical features, but placed a stay for 14 days from that day. This case was appealed to the Ninth Circuit, where it granted its own stay.

On March 31, 2023, Judge Dana Sabraw in Renna v. Bonta granted another preliminary injunction against requiring features as well as the requirement to remove three grandfathered handguns for every new handgun added onto the roster. However, he placed a stay pending appeal. This case was also appealed to the Ninth Circuit.

=== Microstamping ===
On May 17, 2013, the state attorney general began enforcing a new law requiring that semi-automatic pistols incorporate microstamping. With this technology, very small markings are engraved, using a laser, on the tip of the firing pin and on the breechface of the firearm. When the gun is fired, these etchings may be transferred to the primer by the firing pin, and to the cartridge case head by the breechface, using the pressure created when a round is fired. If successful, this imprints two identifying numbers, unique to that gun, on each spent cartridge casing. This requirement applies to new guns being added to the California Department of Justice's roster of handguns certified for sale; semi-automatic handgun models already listed on the roster are not required to incorporate microstamping. This law was passed in 2007 and the wording in the law stated that it would become effective when the technology was available to at least two manufacturers, unencumbered by a patent.

Currently no manufacturer actually uses this technology in firearms available to the public. As such, new models of handguns are de facto illegal for California residents to purchase.

In June 2018, in the case of National Shooting Sports Foundation v. California, the California Supreme Court upheld the state's microstamping law. The court wrote, "Impossibility can occasionally excuse noncompliance with a statute. But impossibility does not authorize a court to go beyond interpreting a statute and simply invalidate it." A spokesman for the National Shooting Sports Foundation said that no new models of semiautomatic handguns will be marketed in California.

In August 2018, in the case of Pena v. Lindley, the Ninth Circuit found the requirement to be constitutional via the now-invalidated two-step approach.

On September 29, 2020, Governor Gavin Newsom signed AB 2847 into law. Previously, handguns were required to have at least two microstamps before being admitted to the roster. After AB 2847 was signed into law, which became effective July 1, 2022, handguns need only one microstamp before being admitted. However, for every new handgun satisfying the microstamping criterion along with the other requirements, three handguns not having the mechanical features are to be removed starting from the handgun with the earliest admittance date.

On February 13, 2023, California Senator Catherine Blakespear introduced SB 452, which would require all handguns to have a microstamp starting January 1, 2027, if passed into law. It was eventually modified to go into effect starting January 1, 2028.

On September 26, 2023, Gavin Newsom signed SB 452 into law.

== Concealed carry ==
California is effectively a "shall issue" state for concealed carry due to the Supreme Court's decision in New York State Rifle & Pistol Association, Inc. v. Bruen. Residents of incorporated cities and towns have the option to apply for a concealed carry license through their local police department or through the sheriff's office in their county of residence. Applicants must generally be residents of the jurisdiction in which the permit application is filed. The only exception to this is for non-resident applicants with a bona-fide place of business in the jurisdiction where the permit application is filed, in which case the permit is valid only in that jurisdiction. A permit may be issued, by a county Sheriff or city Chief or head of municipal police, in one of two formats:

1. A license to carry concealed a pistol, revolver, or other firearm capable of being concealed upon the person.
2. Where the population of the county is less than 200,000 persons according to the most recent federal decennial census, a license to carry loaded and exposed in that county a pistol, revolver, or other firearm capable of being concealed upon the person."

California does not recognize any concealed carry permits issued by other states or their political subdivisions. With exceptions for nonresident Active Duty military members permanently stationed within California, state law generally forbids nonresidents from obtaining a California CCW permit. On December 4, 2023, a lawsuit challenging California's laws forbidding nonresidents' concealed carry permits and nonresidents from obtaining California's CCW permit got filed. As of September 2011, there were around 35,000 active concealed carry permits in California, compared to a total population of 39 million.

California law (Penal Code §26150 and §26155) historically required that the sheriff of a county or a city police chief find both "good moral character" and that "good cause" exists before issuing a license to carry a concealed weapon. Following the Supreme Court's decision in New York State Rifle & Pistol Association, Inc. v. Bruen (2022), which held analogous "proper cause" requirements unconstitutional, the California Attorney General issued Legal Alert OAG-2022-02 directing issuing authorities to cease enforcement of the "good cause" provision. Issuance is therefore now effectively "shall-issue" as to good cause, though the statutory "good moral character" requirement remains in force. While it is generally believed to be extremely difficult to obtain a license to carry a concealed weapon (CCW) in California, the difficulty varies greatly by city and county of residence. Some jurisdictions have established additional local requirements the applicant must meet, as a matter of demonstrating suitability, before the issuing authority grants a CCW permit. For example, Alameda county requires an applicant to obtain a mental health assessment at the applicant's expense as part of each county's permit application process.

Additionally, the definition of "Good Moral Character" is not defined in the law but is instead left to be interpreted by each individual Sheriff or Chief of Police that chooses to issue. Agencies that have restrictive policies can use this Good Moral Character clause as an additional tool for denial, but even agencies with less restrictive policies utilize the Good Moral Character clause to "weed out" those who, while they can pass a background investigation, may not otherwise be desirable for the agency to issue a permit to. In general the definition of Good Moral Character is thought to mean that an individual is of a responsible nature. Qualities like honesty, convictions, lawsuits, civil issues, negative interaction with law enforcement, speeding tickets, DUIs, credit scores, employment history, back taxes and the like can be used to show that an individual lacks "Good Moral Character" and can be used to deny issuance of a CCW permit.

While the state had enforced its "good cause" requirement, in Los Angeles County, many licenses were issued to people who donated to former Sheriff Lee Baca. Some departments are now being challenged in federal lawsuits, under the Equal Protection clause of the Fourteenth Amendment.

Some argued that the California system for CCW issuance fostered political corruption and systematic discrimination of applicants, as it has been publicized that numerous celebrities, government officials, and campaign donors had been issued CCW licenses in cities and counties where the general public have been consistently denied. CCW issuance is also extremely low in areas where the population has a high concentration of minorities and minority applicants are more frequently denied, causing some to allege institutional racism.

Carrying a concealed firearm without a permit is a misdemeanor with a minimum penalty of 90 days in jail. It may be prosecuted as a felony if any one of over a dozen specific circumstances exists, such as carry by a felon, carry in relation to gang activity, carry with the intent to commit a violent crime, etc.

Riverside County's policy of preventing non-citizens from applying for permits was struck down on May 22, 2019.

=== Peruta v. San Diego ===
On February 13, 2014, a three-judge panel of a federal appeals court, in the case of Peruta v. San Diego, ruled that California's may-issue concealed carry rules as implemented by the County of San Diego, in combination with its ban on open carry in most areas of the state, violate the Second Amendment, because they together deny law-abiding citizens the right to bear arms in public for the lawful purpose of self-defense.

The San Diego County Sheriff's Department issued a press release dated February 21, 2014 stating it will not seek review of the decision by the entire membership of judges sitting in the Ninth Circuit, and "Should the decision of the Ninth Circuit become final, the Sheriff's Department will begin to issue CCW's in situations where the applicant has met all other lawful qualifications and has requested a CCW for purposes of self-defense." This paves the way for California's may-issue law to be replaced with a shall-issue law.

On February 27, 2014, California Attorney General Kamala Harris filed a petition for en banc review of the decision. As the state was not a formal party of the case, her action is not an appeal, but merely a request that the full court re-hear the case en banc on its own initiative. However, the petition filed was denied by the Ninth Circuit on November 12, 2014. However, Chief Judge Thomas of the Ninth Circuit ordered on March 26, 2015, that the case be reheard en banc. The en banc oral arguments were heard on June 16, 2015. On June 9, 2016, the Ninth Circuit reversed its prior decision and ruled that "The right of a member of the general public to carry a concealed firearm in public is not, and never has been, protected by the Second Amendment." The court's ruling did not address open carry in public, leaving that issue open to potential future litigation.

On June 26, 2017, the Supreme Court refused to grant certiorari to hear an appeal of the Ninth Circuit's en banc decision. Justices Clarence Thomas and Neil Gorsuch dissented from the denial.

=== NYSRPA v. Bruen ===
On June 23, 2022, the Supreme Court issued a decision in New York State Rifle & Pistol Association, Inc. v. Bruen, holding that New York's requirement that carry permit applicants demonstrate a good reason to require a permit was unconstitutional. The following week, the California Attorney General directed state law enforcement authorities to cease enforcement of California's own good cause restriction. As a result, the state is shall-issue, but the ease of acquiring a permit has yet to be determined as the Attorney General emphasized that issuing authorities may continue to enforce the good moral character requirement in a manner the objective nature of which is unknown.

=== May v. Bonta and SB 2 ===
In response to Bruen, the California Legislature passed Senate Bill 2 (SB 2), signed by Governor Gavin Newsom in September 2023 and effective January 1, 2024. SB 2 eliminated the "good cause" requirement in line with Bruen, but designated a wide range of locations — including public transit, parks, playgrounds, hospitals, places of worship, banks, bars and restaurants that serve alcohol, and their adjacent parking lots — as "sensitive places" where even licensed CCW holders may not carry. SB 2 also flipped the default rule for private property held open to the public, prohibiting CCW carry there absent express permission from the owner.

May v. Bonta (C.D. Cal. No. 8:23-cv-01696), brought by the California Rifle & Pistol Association, the Second Amendment Foundation, Gun Owners of America, the Liberal Gun Club, and individual plaintiffs including Reno May, challenged those provisions of SB 2. On December 20, 2023, Judge Cormac J. Carney issued a preliminary injunction blocking most of the sensitive-place designations and the private-property default rule. On December 30, 2023, a Ninth Circuit motions panel administratively stayed the injunction — leaving SB 2 briefly enforceable on January 1, 2024 — but a merits panel dissolved that stay on January 6, 2024, reinstating the injunction.

On September 6, 2024, a Ninth Circuit panel — in a consolidated ruling with Carralero v. Bonta and Wolford v. Lopez — affirmed the preliminary injunction in part and reversed it in large part. The court upheld the injunction as to public transit, places of worship, banks, hospitals, public gatherings, and the private-property default rule, along with parking lots serving those locations; but it reversed the injunction as to parks and athletic facilities, playgrounds, libraries, casinos, zoos, stadiums, museums, amusement parks, and bars and restaurants serving alcohol, allowing SB 2's carry ban in those locations to take effect. A petition for rehearing en banc was denied in January 2025, over a dissent from Judge Lawrence VanDyke joined by five other judges, and California began enforcing the surviving sensitive-place provisions on January 23, 2025.

== Open carry ==
Open carry of firearms is governed in California by a set of laws that, at times, conflict with one another. This has created significant confusion over the legality of open carry in the state. Open carry of loaded or unloaded firearms in public is generally prohibited, although open carry may be allowed in unincorporated rural areas where permitted by local ordinance, and elsewhere under certain circumstances.

The Mulford Act prohibited personal possession (i.e., carry) of a loaded firearm in incorporated areas (such as inside city limits) or prohibited areas of unincorporated territory without a license to carry or other exemption provided for by law. A license to carry "loaded and exposed" firearms may be issued by a Police Chief or County Sheriff in a county with population of less than 200,000 persons at the last census. No license or permit is required to openly carry a loaded firearm in unincorporated areas where discharge is not prohibited by local ordinance. State law provides an affirmative defense to open-carry charges in immediate-danger situations: §26045 as to loaded carry (§25850), §26362 as to unloaded handgun open carry (§26350), and §26405(r) as to unloaded long-gun open carry (§26400). However, one using this rationale as the basis for openly carrying a firearm can expect to be detained and questioned by law enforcement (and possibly arrested and charged with unlawful carrying of a firearm if the officer does not believe that open carry is sufficiently justified; subjecting one carrying under this rationale to substantial legal expense, even in the event of such charges being dropped or the individual being acquitted at trial), especially in more densely populated areas.

California Penal Code §25850 (formerly 12031) defines what constitutes a loaded weapon. For Penal Code to have validity, all following must apply to the case.

1.1. "Loaded"

A firearm is "loaded" when there is:

an unexpended cartridge or shell, consisting of a case that holds a charge of powder and a bullet or shot, in, or attached in any manner to, the firearm...including, but not limited to, in the firing chamber, magazine, or clip thereof attached to the firearm.. Therefore, carrying a loaded magazine separate from the handgun is NOT Prohibited under the CA Penal Code. As long as the loaded magazine is not inserted into the gun, one is carrying/transporting an unloaded weapon.

e.g. Ammunition and handgun are in the same box but the handgun does not have a loaded magazine inserted, nor a round in the chamber.

In the case of People v. Clark (1996) a shotgun shell attached to the shotgun (e.g. "side-saddle"), although not chambered or placed in a position where it was able to be fired, was declared to be legal under California law and the charge of having a loaded firearm against Clark was dismissed.

Prior to January 1, 2012, it was legal to openly carry an unloaded handgun in public. In October 2011, Governor Jerry Brown signed a bill that modifies the law on openly carrying an unloaded firearm to match the restrictions for openly carrying a loaded weapon. Legislation was later signed by Governor Brown to expand these restrictions to long guns and shotguns, except while hunting.

On one challenge to the law, first filed in 2019, federal district judge Kimberly J. Mueller upheld the ban on openly carrying handguns in 2023 as constitutional. Mueller's decision was reversed by a 2–1 decision by the Ninth Circuit in January 2026, which ruled that under the 2022 Supreme Court case New York State Rifle & Pistol Ass'n v. Bruen, open carry "is part of this nation's history and tradition".

== Transportation ==
PC§ 25610 . When being transported, handguns must be unloaded and in a locked fully enclosed container other than the glove box or any console attached to the vehicle. The trunk of a car is considered to be a locked container but a glove box or "utility box" is specifically forbidden. If one believes he or she is within a "gun-free school zone" (area surrounding 1,000 feet from the edge of school grounds which teaches any grade from kindergarten to 12th grade) then the handgun must be locked in a fully enclosed container. Failure to lock up a handgun while in a school zone is a violation of federal (only if one does not possess a concealed weapons permit issued by California) and state law.

Long guns (rifles, shotguns) must be unloaded when transported in a vehicle. There is no requirement for a locked container with the exception of long guns considered to be "assault weapons". Federal law requires locking containers when inside of a "gun-free school zone." In U.S. v. Lopez the Supreme Court ruled the federal Gun-Free School Zone Act was an unconstitutional exercise of Congress's power under the commerce clause. However, in 1996 Congress passed an amendment to the law requiring the gun to have traveled in interstate commerce, thereby voiding the effect of the ruling.

Assault weapons, as defined by California law, must always be transported in locked containers and may only be transported under certain circumstances

=== Traveling into California for purposes of competition ===
PC§ 30665. Possession and Importation of Assault Weapon or .50 BMG Rifle Into State by Nonresident; Conditions Permitting Sections 30600, 30605, and 30610 shall not apply to the possession and importation of an assault weapon or a .50 BMG rifle into this state by a nonresident if all of the following conditions are met: (a) The person is attending or going directly to or coming directly from an organized competitive match or league competition that involves the use of an assault weapon or a .50 BMG rifle. (b) The competition or match is conducted on the premises of one of the following: (1) A target range that holds a regulatory or business license for the purpose of practicing shooting at that target range. (2) A target range of a public or private club or organization that is organized for the purpose of practicing shooting at targets. (c) The match or competition is sponsored by, conducted under the auspices of, or approved by, a law enforcement agency or a nationally or state recognized entity that fosters proficiency in, or promotes education about, firearms. (d) The assault weapon or .50 BMG rifle is transported in accordance with Section 25610 or Article 3 (commencing with Section 25505) of Chapter 2 of Division 5. (e) The person is 18 years of age or over and is not in a class of persons prohibited from possessing firearms by virtue of Chapter 2 (commencing with Section 29800) or Chapter 3 (commencing with Section 29900) of Division 9 of this code or Section 8100 or 8103 of the Welfare and Institutions Code. (Added by Stats. 2010, SB 1080, Ch. 711, Sec. 6. Operative January 1, 2012.)

== Child safety ==
Firearms must be kept locked up when children may be present. The 2008 California Dangerous Weapons Control Law modified California Penal Code §12035 defining criminal storage of a firearm as keeping "any loaded firearm within any premises that are under his or her custody or control and he or she knows or reasonably should know that a child is likely to gain access to the firearm." A person may be charged with a crime, if he or she keeps a loaded firearm, and the child or a prohibited person takes the firearm to a public place or causes injury. The law was further expanded in 2019 to include unloaded firearms.

== NFA firearms ==
It is unlawful for a California citizen to possess a Title II weapon, (categorized NFA firearms), regulated weaponry such as e.g. a fully automatic firearm or a short-barreled shotgun/rifle without a license i.e. permission issued from the DOJ such as for instance FFL-type license. Enforcement of the ban varies throughout the state. Authorities in most urban areas will prosecute someone for merely possessing a prohibited firearm regardless of intent, whereas county sheriffs and local police in some rural counties have either refused to enforce the ban or to only prosecute those in possession of banned weapons who demonstrate malicious intent.

== Assault weapons ==
Since 1989, it is illegal to sell a firearm that the state has defined as an assault weapon and that has been listed in the California Department of Justice (DOJ) roster of prohibited firearms, unless one holds a Dangerous Weapons Permit issued by the state Department of Justice. This includes many military look-alike semi-automatic rifles and .50 caliber BMG rifles. DOJ roster firearms may be legally possessed if registered with the state prior to January 2005. Military look-alike firearms that are not listed on the DOJ roster of prohibited firearms, known as "off-list lowers," are legal* to own and possess as long as state laws concerning configuration are followed. *Technically these "off-list" lowers are Category 2 assault weapons under current California law. However, in the 2001 case Harrott v. County of Kings (25 P.3d 649 (Cal. 2001), the Category 2 assault weapon law was ruled unenforceable. With the passage of Senate Bill 880 and Assembly Bill 1135 in June 2016, the state's assault weapon ban has been expanded to include all semi-automatic center-fire rifles and shotguns with military-style features that lack a fixed magazine. This expanded the class of firearms deemed to be assault weapons to include rifles that were previously not considered assault weapons because they had a "bullet button" magazine release instead of a standard push-button magazine release. The sale or transfer of such weapons is prohibited, effective January 1, 2017. Those purchased prior to January 1, 2017, must be registered with the DOJ by June 30, 2018. It is illegal to import, sell, give, trade, or lend a magazine that holds more than 10 rounds of ammunition, except for fixed tubular magazines for lever-action rifles and .22 caliber rifles; however, the possession of such magazines was legal until the passage of Proposition 63 in November 2016, effective July 1, 2017. The ban on possession was prevented from going into effect by a federal district court on June 29, 2017. Subsequently, on March 29, 2019, the entire large-capacity law was ruled unconstitutional but that ruling was put on hold while the case is under appeal. The ban on possession of large-capacity magazines remains enjoined.

On June 4, 2021, in the case of Miller v. Bonta, a federal judge in San Diego ruled that the assault weapons ban of 1989 is unconstitutional as it violates the Second Amendment. The judge granted a 30-day stay in the ruling to allow time for the state to file an appeal.

=== Assault Weapons Control Act of 1989 ===
The Roberti-Roos Assault Weapons Control Act of 1989 (AWCA), its augmentation in 1999, and the .50 Caliber BMG Regulation Act of 2004 have led to many restrictions on semi-automatic firearms. In addition to a list of specific firearms that are banned by name, the following firearms are banned by characteristic (from Penal Code §30515(a), formerly §12276.1):

(1) A semiautomatic, centerfire rifle that has the capacity to accept a detachable magazine and any one of the following:

(A) A pistol grip that protrudes conspicuously beneath the action of the weapon.
(B) A thumbhole stock.
(C) A folding or telescoping stock.
(D) A grenade launcher or flare launcher.
(E) A flash suppressor.
(F) A forward pistol grip.

(2) A semiautomatic, centerfire rifle that has a fixed magazine with the capacity to accept more than 10 rounds.
(3) A semiautomatic, centerfire rifle that has an overall length of less than 30 inches [762 mm].
(4) A semiautomatic pistol that has the capacity to accept a detachable magazine and any one of the following:

(A) A threaded barrel, capable of accepting a flash suppressor, forward handgrip.
(B) A second handgrip.
(C) A shroud that is attached to, or partially or completely encircles, the barrel that allows the bearer to fire the weapon without burning his or her hand, except a slide that encloses the barrel.
(D) The capacity to accept a detachable magazine at some location outside of the pistol grip.

(5) A semiautomatic pistol with a fixed magazine that has the capacity to accept more than 10 rounds.
(6) A semiautomatic shotgun that has both of the following:

(A) A folding or telescoping stock.
(B) A pistol grip that protrudes conspicuously beneath the action of the weapon, thumbhole stock, or vertical handgrip.

(7) A semiautomatic shotgun that has the ability to accept a detachable magazine.
(8) Any shotgun with a revolving cylinder.

In addition, (Penal Code §12001.5) bans, by definition, short-barreled shotguns and short-barreled rifles. Defined in Penal Code §12020; a short-barreled shotgun is defined as a firearm (designed, redesigned, or altered) to fire a fixed shotgun shell and has a barrel or barrels of less than 18 inches or an overall length of less than 26 inches. A short-barreled rifle is defined as a semiautomatic, center fire rifle with a barrel length of less than 16 inches or an overall length of less than 26 inches.

While a Rossi Circuit Judge (18" barrel) is considered a shotgun with a revolving cylinder (violation of #8 above), the CA DOJ claims it is legal because it has a rifled barrel. However, the Taurus Judge handgun is considered a "short-barreled shotgun" and therefore illegal in CA, even though it fires the same shot shell as the Circuit Judge, as well as has a rifled barrel. Conversely, there are many revolvers that fire shot shells made in different calibers (e.g. 22, 9mm, 38, etc.) mostly used to shoot birds or snakes. Even though these handguns, with less than 18" barrels, fire shot shells, like the Judge, they are legal in California.

In the wake of the United States Supreme Court case New York State Rifle & Pistol Association, Inc. v. Bruen in 2022, the Assault Weapon Control Act was challenged in court, and in October 2023, Judge Roger Benitez of the United States District Court for the Southern District of California ruled that the law was unconstitutional on the basis of Bruen, that there was no historical tradition of banning the sale of weapons.

U.S. District Court Judge Roger Benitez issued his detailed opinion criticizing and ultimately striking down California's long-standing prohibition on assault weapons. asserting that the law "has no historical pedigree and it is extreme." This decision followed a series of legal challenges against firearm regulations in the state, with Judge Benitez playing a pivotal role. State lawmakers stated they would appeal this decision.

Nearly a month before this latest declaration, he had already taken a stand against restrictive gun laws by declaring California's ban on magazines capable of holding more than ten rounds of ammunition unconstitutional. He argued that this ban infringed upon the Second Amendment rights of firearms owners, showcasing his consistent commitment to upholding what he interprets as citizens' constitutional rights to bear arms.

=== Kasler v. Lockyer assault weapon list ===
Following the Kasler v. Lockyer ruling, California codified in the California Code of Regulations a list of firearms designated as assault weapons by make and model. Under Penal Code §30600 et seq., these firearms are illegal to manufacture, distribute, transport, import, sell, give, or lend within California, and further sale or transfer to private individuals is prohibited. Possession by owners who registered the firearms with the DOJ before the applicable cutoff deadlines remains lawful, subject to the transfer and inheritance restrictions in §30915 (surrender, rendering inoperable, or removal from the state upon the registered owner's death).These firearms include the Bushmaster XM-15, Colt AR-15, Armalite AR-15, DPMS Panther, and Rock River Arms, Inc, as well as the Kalashnikov USA Hunting Rifle and various other AK-style and AR-style firearms.

=== Bullet button and refined definition of a "fixed magazine" ===
Methods of obtaining particular styles of firearms similar to assault weapons have been achieved by design changes by gun parts manufacturers. One of the most common modifications prior to 2017 was a "bullet button", which modified a rifle so that the magazine is not removable without the use of a tool (which could include a bullet used as a tool per state law), which presses a button that a finger alone cannot press. Weapons with this feature were deemed to no longer have a "detachable magazine" within the assault weapons definition, and therefore could be exempt from the law as it then stood, depending on the other requirements. As certain portions of firearms (the lower receiver, or "lower" for short, which is legally considered to be the firearm) are banned by model name under California state law, multiple modifications could be made to allow a rifle to comply under state law.

It is under these exceptions that the weapons used in the 2015 San Bernardino terrorist attack were legal when initially purchased, and subsequently illegally sold to the perpetrators. The perpetrators subsequently illegally altered these exempt weapons in ways that violated other provisions of the California law, by enabling the DPMS Panther Arms AR-15 rifle to use a high-capacity magazine and illegally modifying the Smith & Wesson M&P15 rifle.

In order to close what was perceived by proponents to be a loophole in the law enabling such modifications, the legislature passed Assembly Bill 1135 and Senate Bill 880 in 2016 which, amongst other things, narrowed the definition of a "fixed magazine" as required under the law "to mean an ammunition feeding device contained in, or permanently attached to, a firearm in such a manner that the device cannot be removed without disassembly of the firearm action."

Shortly after being signed into law, Darin Prince, the creator of the bullet button, revealed the bullet button reloaded in order to comply with the new law.

Following the San Bernardino shooting, which left 16 people (including the two shooters) dead and the shooters using two illegally acquired and modified AR-style firearms that used the bullet button, California further specified fixed magazines, and deemed that the bullet button was not a sufficient way to fix the magazine, deeming it illegal and closing the "bullet button loophole". As of SB 880's implementation, the use of the bullet button alone constitutes the firearm as an assault weapon, deeming it illegal in California.

=== Exceptions ===
California's assault weapons law is not an outright ban on statutorily defined assault weapons per se, as it contains a provision for an individual to apply for a Dangerous Weapon Permit from the state DOJ to acquire, transport and possess a firearm that meets the state's assault weapon criteria, although such approval is generally not granted unless the applicant qualifies under a limited set of exceptions:

- California's assault weapon definition currently does not apply to smoothbore (e.g., is neither a rifle nor a shotgun) long guns; rimfire, or manual-action (e.g., bolt, lever, pump, break actions, revolvers, etc.) weapons that would otherwise have defined assault weapon features.
- Individuals who owned listed assault weapons before the 1989 assault weapons ban went into effect are allowed to keep such firearms; owners were required to register such weapons with the California DOJ by a deadline established in the assault weapons ban legislation. Transfer of registered assault weapons to private individuals is generally not permitted, including in cases where the owner is deceased. Upon their death, the assault weapon must either be rendered permanently inoperable; surrendered to the DOJ, a police department, or licensed firearms dealer; or removed from the state.
- Non-resident, active duty military members who bring their firearms into California when permanently assigned to a military installation within the state. Prior to arrival, the military member must submit an application for a Military Assault Weapon Permit and a copy of his or her assignment orders and an authorization letter from the installation commander to the DOJ, and the firearm(s) in question are legal to obtain and possess in his or her home state. If a non-resident military member decides to establish residency in California, he or she must either surrender listed assault weapons to the DOJ, police department, or licensed firearms dealer; or otherwise remove the weapons from the state prior to becoming a resident and/or separating from the Armed Services. Military Assault Weapon Permits are valid for one year from the date of issuance, and can be renewed annually as long as the military member remains permanently stationed within the state.
- Resident police officers in California may own listed assault weapons with permission of their police chief and the DOJ. As of 2011, police officers may keep their assault weapons and large-capacity magazines after retirement or separation from the force. No permission is needed for police to purchase and possess magazines that hold more than ten rounds of ammunition, but they must present proof of their active law enforcement affiliation.
- Firearms that would have been classified as assault weapons but are used for Olympic and International competitions are exempt. There is a list of the exempt firearms, and new firearms can be added to the list if needed by USA Shooting, the governing body for Olympic and International Shooting Sport competition.
- Assault weapons being imported into California for sale and delivery to a federal, state or local governmental agency for use by employees of such agencies to perform official duties.
- Private security firms may seek approval from the DOJ to arm its employees with weapons that meet California's assault weapon definition while on duty. The DOJ in its discretion may issue a Dangerous Weapons Permit to security firms on a need-based determination (e.g., significance of persons, items, or sites being protected by the applying firm, threat level against such persons, items, or sites, etc.). Employees of such firms are subject to extensive training and vetting requirements prior to obtaining DOJ approval to carry assault weapons on duty.
- Assault weapons intended for use in the film industry are allowed, with approval from the DOJ.
- Assault weapons possessed by federal, state, and local historical societies, museums, and institutional collections which are open to the public, provided they are properly housed, secured from unauthorized handling, and unloaded.
- Individuals who demonstrate exceptional good cause for the issuance of a Dangerous Weapons Permit (meeting this criterion is extremely rare—usually limited to individuals with political connections), and further demonstrate their acquisition and possession of defined assault weapons will not threaten the public.
- Firearms rendered permanently inoperable per ATF specifications (typically by welding the receiver and severing the barrel) are no longer legally considered "firearms" under federal law, and therefore fall outside the scope of California's assault weapons definition entirely. This is not a permit-based exception but a categorical one.

=== Nonresidents transporting assault weapons through California ===
There are protections under the federal Firearm Owners Protection Act for nonresidents traveling through California with firearms that meet the state's assault weapon criteria. First, the weapon must be legal for the traveler to own under federal law and under the laws of his or her home state and the state of destination. Additionally, the weapon in question must be unloaded with the firearm and ammunition locked in separate cases and placed in an area of the vehicle that is not easily accessible, such as the trunk of a car or bed of a truck. Finally, the traveler should traverse the state by the shortest route and make the minimum number of stops practicable.

== Other laws ==
There are also numerous other laws, such as prohibition on possession of tracer ammunition and handgun armor-piercing ammunition. All rifles are normally exempt for the original owner if properly registered at the time of the acts which prohibited them.

In addition, the law states that any weapon that is part of the AR-15 series or AK series is also an assault weapon, regardless of manufacturer; this dates back to 1989 ban, and was confirmed in the Kasler v. Lockyer decision, filed 6/29/2000. However, the California Supreme Court declared the identification of assault weapon by series membership to be too dubious and difficult for the average citizen or even trial court to make without specific and clear model identification guidelines. The court thus set some specific requirements for the "series" identification portion of the law in their ruling of Harrott v. County of Kings, filed 6/28/2001. This decision required banned firearms to be specifically listed by make and model in California Code of Regulations (the "Kasler list"); it did not address assault weapons defined by features. Thus, only firearms specifically listed by exact combination of manufacturer and model name, or conforming to explicit exterior characteristics (such as a pistol grip or folding stock in combination with a detachable magazine) can be banned under current legislation.

Once it was realized the California Department of Justice (CA DOJ) had not updated the "Kasler list" in the five years after the Harrott decision, many Californians found they could legally purchase and possess AR and AK rifles not yet officially identified as "series" members. As of February 2006, over 10,000 "off-list" receivers (frames) for such rifles have been legally imported to, and purchased within, California. The only requirement for these receivers are that the combination of make and model is not explicitly listed as banned, and as long as the owner does not add certain "characteristic features" turning the firearm into an assault weapon (i.e. pistol grip, flash suppressor, etc.). These characteristic features can be used, however, if a nondetachable 10-round (or less) magazine, conforming in the converse to the California Code of Regulations §5469, formerly §978.20, definition of detachable magazine, is affixed to such "off-list" rifles. These off-list rifles can also be used without a pistol grip, folding stock, or flash hider, in which case it is legal to own and use them with detachable magazines, including large-capacity magazines. (California Code of Regulations §978.20 was changed without regulatory effect renumbering §978.20 to §5469 filed 6-28-2006)

The CA DOJ produced a report from the Ferranto Commission in response, intimating that this list will be updated in early 2006; as of December 2006, it had not done so. On February 1, 2006, the CA DOJ also issued a controversial memorandum about this subject; critics say the described actions are not founded or supported within statutory law in Penal Code §§12275–12290. This memo stated that once off-list "series" firearms are declared and registered as assault weapons, they will not be able to have characteristic features added or fixed magazines removed. This is being challenged by pro-gun groups, since there is no criminal violation in the California Penal Code for adding or changing features to a legally acquired, registered assault weapon.

On November 8, 2005, San Francisco voters enacted Proposition H, a total ban on the manufacture, sale, transfer or distribution of firearms or ammunition in San Francisco, as well as a ban on the possession of handguns within the city by San Francisco residents (exempting police officers, security guards and the like). The ban did not prohibit possession of weapons other than handguns, nor did it prohibit residents of other cities from possessing handguns in San Francisco. While this measure made San Francisco the third major U.S. city, following Washington, D.C. and Chicago, to enact a ban on handguns, San Francisco's ban extended further, not implementing a grandfather clause found in Chicago's and Washington D.C.'s laws that protected existing gun owners. Proposition H stated that handgun owners in San Francisco must turn over their handguns to the police by the end of March 2006, have them confiscated, or move outside the city limits. In June 2006, Judge James Warren of the San Francisco County Superior Court struck down Proposition H, asserting that under California law local officials do not have the authority to ban handgun ownership by law-abiding citizens. On January 9, 2008, a California appellate court upheld Judge Warren's decision. The National Rifle Association (NRA) opposed the ban from its inception.

In May 2013, the Los Angeles City Council voted to draft a law prohibiting the possession of large-capacity ammunition magazines, sparking lawsuit threats from two gun rights organizations. In November of the same year, the city of Sunnyvale passed a similar ordinance along with three other firearm related restrictions. The new ordinance requires city residents to "dispose, donate, or sell" any magazine capable of holding more than ten rounds within a proscribed period of time once the measure took effect. Measure C also requires:

1. city residents to report firearm theft to the police within 48 hours,
2. residents to lock up their guns at home, and
3. gun dealers to keep logs of ammunition sales. The city of San Francisco soon passed similar ordinances.

SB199, passed in August 2014, requires some fake guns to have bright colors for safety reasons.

Bill 1014 that has passed the State Senate in September 2014 would allow the police to confiscate guns from high-risk individuals for a period of 21 days without a warrant or court order. On 30 September 2014, Governor Brown signed the law which is phased in through 1 January 2016. This makes California the fourth state (behind Connecticut, Indiana, and New York) to have a weapons seizure law.

SB 869, newly signed by Governor Brown, makes it a crime (infraction with a fine up to $1,000) to leave a firearm in an unattended vehicle unless it has been either 1. locked in the trunk, 2. stored in a locked container that is placed out of plain view or 3. stored in a locked container that is permanently affixed to the interior of the vehicle and not in plain view. The specific language of the new law can be found in Penal Code Section 25140. Active peace officers are specifically called out as not being exempt, unless in the event that immediate aid is required that is within the course of their employment. Likely, this law will be enforced upon the report that a firearm was stolen out of a vehicle, in which case the owner will be held responsible.

In California, the police or a person's family member can ask a judge to confiscate the firearms of a person who appears to pose a threat to themselves or others. The weapons may be held for up to a year. Such orders from out-of-state are also recognized. As of September 1, 2020, eligible petitioners will be expanded to include an employer, coworker, and school teacher or employee, and the maximum allowable duration will be extended to 5 years.

Privately made firearms and their components are regulated. Anyone wanting to build a homemade firearm is required to obtain a serial number from the state (de facto registration) and pass a background check. As of July 1, 2024, the sale of all "firearm precursor parts" is required to be done through a licensed dealer.

Some localities have adopted Second Amendment sanctuary resolutions.

== SB 1327 ==
SB 1327, signed into law in July 2022 by California Governor Gavin Newsom, is modeled after the Texas Heartbeat Act, which allows private citizens in Texas to sue anyone that performs or aids in abortions. SB 1327 similarly awards any California citizen $10,000 if they successfully sue anyone who manufactures or distributes guns or gun parts that are illegal in California. Also, SB 1327 has a fee-shifting provision in which any party challenging California gun laws if they fully win cannot be a prevailing party, and if they lose on any part of the case, the government has three years to recover fees from the challenging party and its attorneys. While SB 1327 uses the same enforcement mechanism as the Texas law, it underlines Newsom's (and the California legislature's) opposition to that mechanism, by providing that all its provisions shall become invalid upon invalidation of the Texas law. As Newsom said of the Supreme Court's 5:4 decision upholding the Texas law's enforcement mechanism, "It was a terrible decision, but these are the rules that they have established."

On December 19, 2022, Judge Roger Benitez declared the fee-shifting provision of SB 1327 unconstitutional. Gavin Newsom, who originally criticized Benitez for his pre-Bruen ruling in the assault weapons ban challenge Miller v. Bonta (which is the same name as one of the cases challenging the fee-shifting provision), thanked Benitez for striking the fee-shifting provision down.

On June 5, 2023, Judge Roger Benitez ordered Bonta and Newsom to pay the plaintiffs $556,957.66 in legal fees.

== See also ==
- .50 Caliber BMG Regulation Act of 2004
- Concealed carry in the United States
- Gun laws in the United States by state
- Guy Montag Doe v. San Francisco Housing Authority
- Law of California
- Mulford Act
- Peruta v. San Diego
- Roberti-Roos Assault Weapons Control Act of 1989
- San Francisco Proposition H (2005)
