= Miller v. Bonta =

2021 pending federal appellate court case regarding California's assault weapon ban

- Court: United States Court of Appeals for the Ninth Circuit
- Full case name: James Miller, et al., Plaintiffs, v. Rob Bonta, in his official capacity as Attorney General of the State of California, et al., Defendants
- Citation: 19-cv-1537-BEN (JLB)

Case history
- Prior actions: Miller v. Bonta No. 19-cv-1537-BEN (JLB), injunction and stay, ECF No. 115 (S.D. Cal. 2021)
- Appealed from: United States District Court for the Southern District of California

Miller v. Bonta is a pending court case before Judge Roger Benitez of the U.S. District Court for the Southern District of California concerning California's assault weapon ban, the Roberti–Roos Assault Weapons Control Act of 1989 (AWCA). Judge Roger Benitez struck down the ban in a ruling on June 5, 2021. A three-judge panel of the Ninth Circuit issued a stay of the ruling on June 21, 2021, which left the ban in place as appeals were litigated. The panel then vacated Judge Benitez's ruling and remanded it back down after New York State Rifle & Pistol Association, Inc. v. Bruen was decided. The case was known as Miller v. Becerra before Rob Bonta succeeded Xavier Becerra as Attorney General of California in April 2021.

== Background ==
Gun laws in California are among the strictest in the country. The Roberti–Roos Assault Weapons Control Act of 1989 (AWCA) banned the ownership and transfer of specific models of firearms that were categorized as assault weapons. Signed by Governor George Deukmejian, a Republican, it was the first law passed in response to the Cleveland Elementary School shooting in Stockton that year. It inspired similar bans in six other states and the District of Columbia, as well as the Federal Assault Weapons Ban of 1994 that expired in 2004. In the years since, assault weapons banned by these measures have been used in school shootings in the United States, which remain gun free zones. An amendment to AWCA took effect in 2000, banning assault weapons based on an alternative set of characteristics instead of by model. However, gun owners have been able to comply with the law by making minor adjustments to the weapons or purchasing "California-compliant" rifles of all types.

In August 2000, the AWCA survived a state constitutional challenge in Kasler v. Lockyer before the California Supreme Court. The Ninth Circuit Court of Appeals ruled in Nordyke v. King that the Second Amendment, which protects the right to bear arms, does not apply to state and local governments. However, the U.S. Supreme Court later ruled in McDonald v. City of Chicago that it does apply to all levels of government, making it possible for the act to be challenged in federal court.

Rulings by the U.S. District Court for the Southern District of California, headquartered in San Diego, can have implications across the entire Ninth Circuit, by far the largest in the country. Judge Roger Benitez was nominated to the court by President George W. Bush and confirmed by the Senate with 98 votes in favor and one against, despite overwhelming opposition by a committee of the American Bar Association. Benitez has overturned several California gun control laws. In Duncan v. Becerra and Rhode v. Becerra, he struck down portions of 2016 California Proposition 63 that prohibited possession of high-capacity magazines and required background checks for ammunition purchases, respectively. The state appealed both decisions; the ruling in Duncan v. Bonta was reversed by the U.S. Ninth Circuit Court of Appeals. Gun control advocates say the San Diego court's unique process for transferring related cases to a single judge, out of the court's more than a dozen judges, has encouraged gun rights advocates to engage in forum shopping.

== Legal proceedings ==
=== District court ===
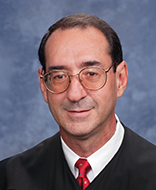
Judge Roger Benitez issued an injunction against the ban on June 4, 2021. His decision was stayed pending appeal.

On August 15, 2019, James Miller, a board member of the San Diego County Gun Owners, sued Attorney General Xavier Becerra and the Director of the California Bureau of Firearms, alleging that the ban was an unconstitutional restriction of Second Amendment rights. He was joined by the San Diego County Gun Owners Political Action Committee, California Gun Rights Foundation, Second Amendment Foundation, and Firearms Policy Coalition, along with three other San Diego County residents who said they legally own rifles or pistols but are unable to use high-capacity magazines in them due to the law.

The case was argued before Senior Judge Roger Benitez of the U.S. District Court for the Southern District of California. The plaintiffs argued that the definition of "assault weapon" is politically motivated and prevents law-abiding citizens from obtaining and using firearms for self-defense, hunting, and other legal purposes. Becerra's office argued that the ban was necessary because assault weapons are more lethal and are disproportionately used in crimes and mass shootings. Benitez denied requests by Everytown for Gun Safety and the Giffords Law Center to Prevent Gun Violence to file amicus briefs in favor of the state. In April 2021, Rob Bonta took over the defense when he succeeded Becerra as Attorney General of California.

On June 4, 2021, Benitez ruled in favor of the plaintiffs, declaring the AWCA to be unconstitutional and issuing a permanent injunction against enforcing specific provisions of the law. He opened the 94-page ruling by likening an AR-15 style rifle to a Swiss Army knife as "a perfect combination of home defense weapon and homeland defense equipment" and describing the AR-15 as "good for both home and battle", citing District of Columbia v. Heller and United States v. Miller. He described the ban as a failed experiment and reasoned that the ban covers weapons that are commonly used for legal purposes. In dismissing the need for a ban on assault rifles, he cited the prevalence of stabbing deaths in the state compared to murders by rifle, and also claimed that "More people have died from the COVID-19 vaccine than mass shootings in California." Upon Bonta's request, Benitez granted a stay of the injunction for 30 days pending appeal.

=== Appellate court ===
On June 10, 2021, California Attorney General Bonta and Bureau of Firearms Director Luis Lopez appealed the ruling to the Ninth Circuit Court of Appeals. On June 21, a three-judge panel of the Ninth Circuit – Barry G. Silverman, Jacqueline Nguyen, and Ryan D. Nelson – granted their request to extend the stay as appeals are litigated. Mayor Sam Liccardo of San Jose has invited other California cities to join an amicus brief supporting the state's appeal.

Another challenge to the AWCA, Rupp v. Bonta, has already been appealed to the Ninth Circuit court from the U.S. District Court for the Central District of California.

On November 30, 2021, the Ninth Circuit Court restored the state ban on high-capacity magazines in Duncan v. Bonta, suggesting that the court would also reverse the lower court ruling in Miller v. Bonta.

On June 23, 2022, the U.S. Supreme Court decided New York State Rifle & Pistol Association, Inc. v. Bruen, broadly rejecting any "means-end tests" such as the strict or intermediate scrutiny the Ninth Circuit had applied in upholding the constitutionality of various gun regulations. The opinion, written by Justice Clarence Thomas, emphasized that going forward the standard for applying the Second Amendment will require the government to "justify its regulation by demonstrating that it is consistent with the Nation's historical tradition of firearm regulation." This newly clarified "text as informed by history" standard is widely expected to significantly affect how gun control cases such as Miller and Rupp are decided.

On August 1, 2022, the Ninth Circuit three-judge panel vacated and remanded the case “for further proceedings consistent with the United States Supreme Court's decision in New York State Rifle & Pistol Ass’n, Inc. v. Bruen.”

=== Remanded case at District Court ===
On October 19, 2023 Judge Roger Benitez delivered a decision on the remanded case in the United States District Court Southern District of California. In this decision he ruled the California assault weapons ban unconstitutional for the second time in that it violated the defendants' Second Amendment rights and granted a permanent injunction on the enforcement of the California statute. A 10 day stay on this ruling was also issued by Judge Benitez in anticipation of an appeal to the Ninth Circuit.

== Reaction ==
State officials, including Governor Gavin Newsom and Attorney General Rob Bonta, issued strongly worded statements opposing Judge Benitez's ruling. Newsom took particular issue with Judge Benitez comparing an AR-15 style rifle to a Swiss Army knife in the first sentence of his opinion. Bonta noted that the ruling had come down days after a mass shooting in San Jose, although the semiautomatic pistols used in that shooting had not been banned. The Giffords Law Center to Prevent Gun Violence called it insulting that the ruling was handed down on National Gun Violence Awareness Day. Gun-rights groups, including the National Rifle Association of America, Firearms Policy Coalition, and Gun Owners of America, celebrated the ruling.

In December 2021, Governor Newsom again cited Judge Benitez's Swiss Army knife comparison in response to the U.S. Supreme Court's decision in Whole Woman's Health v. Jackson that effectively upheld enforcement of the Texas Heartbeat Act. He called for the California State Legislature to apply the act's framework to gun control, by introducing a private right of action against manufacturers, distributors, and sellers of assault weapon or privately made firearm supplies in the state.
