= Assault weapons ban =

Assault weapons ban may refer to:

- Assault weapons legislation in the United States
  - Assault Weapons Ban of 2013, an unsuccessful legislative bill from April 2013
  - Federal Assault Weapons Ban, federal U.S. law of 1994
  - Roberti-Roos Assault Weapons Control Act of 1989, a California law that bans the ownership and transfer of over 50 specific brands and models of firearms

== See also ==
- Overview of gun laws by nation
