= Kasler v. Lockyer =

2000 Supreme Court of California case

On August 16, 2000, in Kasler v. Lockyer, the Supreme Court of California upheld the Roberti-Roos Assault Weapons Control Act (AWCA) with additional expansions to the restrictions. Effective January 1, 2001, all firearms listed on the Assault Weapons Control Act (AWCA), with the addition of more AR and AK-style weapons, were deemed illegal Assault Weapons and were required to be registered, deactivated, or turned in to the state. Kasler v. Lockyer, S069522 (Superior Court of Sacramento County June 29, 2000). However, in 2021, a federal court struck down the law in Miller v. Bonta, which is pending appeal.

== List of prohibited firearms ==
The following are the firearms that are restricted under the Kasler v. Lockyer Assault Weapon List:

=== Restricted AK-style firearms ===
1. American Arms

AK-Y 39
AK-F 39
AK-C 47
AK-F 47

2. Arsenal

SLR (All Variants)
SLG (All Variants)

3. B-West

AK-47 (All Variants)

4. Hesse Arms

Model 47 (All Variants)
Wieger STG 940 Rifle

5. Inter Ordnance - Monroe, NC

RPK
M-97
AK-47 (All Variants)

6. Kalashnikov USA

Hunter Rifle / Saiga

7. MAADI CO

AK 47
AKM
MISR (All Variants)
MISTR (All Variants)

8. Made In China

84S
AKM
86S
AKS
56
AK
56S
AK47

9. MARS

Pistol

10. Mitchell Arms, Inc

M-90
AK-47 (All Variants)
AK-47, 308 Caliber (All Variants)
M-76
RPK

11. Norinco

86S
86 (All Variants)
84 S
81 S (All Variants)
56
RPK Rifle
NHM 90, 90-2, 91 Sport
AK-47 (All Variants)
MAK 90
56 S
Hunter Rifle

12. Ohio Ordnance Works

ROMAK 991
AK-74

13. Poly Technologies

AKS
AK47

14. Valmet

Hunter Rifle
76 S

15. WUM

WUM (All Variants)

=== Restricted AR-style firearms ===
1. American Spirit

USA Model

2. Armalite

AR 10 (All Variants)
M15 (All Variants)
Golden Eagle

3. Bushmaster

XM15 (All Variants)

4. Colt

Law Enforcement (6920)
Match Target (All Variants)
AR-15 (All Variants)
Sporter (All Variants)

5. Dalphon

B.F.D.

6. DPMS

Panther (All Variants)

7. Eagle Arms

M15 (All Variants)
EA-15 A2 H-BAR
EA-15 E1

8. Frankford Arsenal

AR-15 (All Variants)

9. Hesse Arms

HAR 15A2 (All Variants)

10. Knights

SR-15 (All Variants)
SR-25 (All Variants)
RAS (All Variants)

11. Les Baer

Ultimate AR (All Variants)

12. Olympic Arms

AR-15
CAR-97
PCR (All Variants)

13. Ordnance, Inc

AR-15

14. Palmetto

SGA (All Variants)

15. Professional Ordnance, Inc.

Carbon 15 Rifle
Carbon 15 Pistol

16. PWA

All Models

17. Rock River Arms, Inc

Standard A-2
CAR A2
Standard A-4 Flattop
CAR A4 Flattop
NM A2 - DCM Legal
LE Tactical Carbine

18. Wilson Combat

AR-15

=== Firearms on both Kasler v. Lockyer and the AWCA ===
The following firearms were carried over from the AWCA.

==== AK-style firearms ====
1. MAADI CO

AK 47
AKM

2. Made In China

84S
AKM
86S
AKS
56
AK
56S
AK47

3. Norinco

86S
84 S
56
56 S

4. Poly Technologies

AKS
AK47

==== AR-style firearms ====
1. Colt

AR-15
