= Duncan v. Bonta =

2025 court case

- Court: United States Court of Appeals for the Ninth Circuit
- Full case name: Virginia Duncan, et al., Plaintiffs-Appellees v. Rob Bonta, Defendants-Appellants
- Decided: March 20, 2025
- Citations: D.C. No. 3:17-cv-01017-BEN-JLB (S.D. Cal.); 9th Cir. No. 19-55376; 9th Cir. No. 23-55805

Case history
- Prior actions: Preliminary injunction granted. Duncan v. Becerra, 265 F. Supp. 3d 1106 (S.D. Cal. 2017).; Preliminary injunction affirmed, 42 F. App’x 218, (9th Cir. 2018).; Summary judgment granted to plaintiffs, 366 F. Supp. 3d 1131 (S.D. Cal. 2019).; Summary judgment affirmed, 970 F.3d 1133 (9th Cir. 2020).; Rehearing en banc granted, 988 F.3d 1209 (9th Cir. 2021).; Summary judgment reversed, 19 F.4th 1087 (9th Cir. 2021) (en banc).; Granted, vacated, and remanded, 597 U.S. ___ (2022).; Remanded to District Court sub nom Duncan v. Bonta, 49 F.4th 1228 (9th Cir. 2022) (en banc).; Permanent injunction and summary judgment granted to plaintiffs. 695 F. Supp. 3d 1206 (S.D. Cal. 2023).; Permanent injunction stayed, 83 F.4th 803 (9th Cir. 2023) (en banc).
- Appealed from: United States District Court for the Southern District of California

Court membership
- Judges sitting: Murguia, Thomas, Graber, Wardlaw, Paez, Berzon, Ikuta, Hurwitz, R. Nelson, Bumatay, and VanDyke

Case opinions
- Opinion, March 20, 2025.
- Decision by: Graber
- Concurrence: Berzon, joined by Murguia, Thomas, Wardlaw, Paez, Hurwitz
- Dissent: R. Nelson
- Dissent: Bumatay, joined by Ikuta, R. Nelson, VanDyke
- Dissent: VanDyke

Laws applied
- U.S. Const. amend. II; Cal. Penal Code § 32310(c)

Duncan v. Bonta, No. 23-55805, is a United States Court of Appeals for the Ninth Circuit case regarding California's ban on large-capacity magazines.

== Background ==
In 2016, California enacted Senate Bill 1446, which banned the possession of "large capacity magazines" (LCMs)—defined as magazines capable of holding more than ten rounds of ammunition—effective July 1, 2017. Later that same year, California voters passed Proposition 63, which incorporated SB 1446 and added criminal penalties for possession of LCMs.

The plaintiffs, including Virginia Duncan and several others, along with the California Rifle & Pistol Association, challenged the law on constitutional grounds, asserting violations of their Second and Fifth Amendment rights.

The case was first heard in the U.S. District Court for the Southern District of California before Judge Roger T. Benitez. The District Court ruled for the plaintiffs and struck down the law as unconstitutional, holding that it violated the Second Amendment.

The case then proceeded through multiple layers of appellate review. The Ninth Circuit initially heard the case en banc in Duncan v. Bonta (referred to as Duncan V), where it rejected the plaintiffs’ Fifth Amendment takings claim. After the U.S. Supreme Court decided New York State Rifle & Pistol Association, Inc. v. Bruen in 2022—establishing a new framework for evaluating Second Amendment challenges—the case was remanded back to the Ninth Circuit for reconsideration under the Bruen standard.

== Latest proceedings ==
The latest round of proceedings came before an en banc panel of the Ninth Circuit for oral argument on March 19, 2024. The Court released its opinions approximately one year later on March 20, 2025. Along with the Second and Fifth Amendment questions presented by the case, oral arguments also centered around an issue regarding the Court's en banc procedures.

In most Federal Courts of Appeals, en banc review involves all active judges sitting together to hear the case. The Ninth Circuit on the other hand—with 29 active judges—has unique en banc procedures. According to the Ninth Circuit, “[t]he en banc court consists of the Chief Judge, and ten non-recused judges who are randomly drawn.” The Circuit's general orders provide that active judges and any “senior judge who was a member of the three-judge panel assigned to the case being heard or reheard en banc [and] elect[s] to be eligible” may constitute the limited en banc panel. The procedural issue is whether this specific en banc panel—the same one that in 2021 reversed the District Court's 2020 order—can hear the case again, in light of the fact that five of its judges had since assumed senior status.

=== Judge Graber's majority opinion ===
Writing for the en banc court, Judge Graber held that the California law comported with the Second Amendment. Judge Graber first argued magazines are neither "arms" nor protected accessories within the meaning of the Amendment, and that there was thus no constitutional right to own LCMs. Judge Graber then argued that, assuming LCMs are constitutionally protected, California had satisfied its burden of demonstrating a national tradition of protecting citizens from especially dangerous uses of firearms, as required by Bruen.

=== Judge Berzon's concurring opinion ===
Concurring in full in Judge Graber's opinion, Judge Berzon (joined by five others) wrote to criticize Judge VanDyke's dissenting opinion, which includes a video of him handling different firearms. Judge Berzon argued that in doing so, Judge VanDyke's video (1) includes facts outside the appellate record and (2) posits Judge VanDyke as an expert witness.

=== Judge Nelson's dissenting opinion ===
Judge Nelson authored a dissenting opinion in which he associated himself with the opinion of Judge Bumatay, while also touching on the procedural issue in the case.

=== Judge Bumatay's dissenting opinion ===
Judge Bumatay (joined by three others) argued that California's ban on LCMs found no support in the text of the Second Amendment or the nation's history of firearms regulation. Bumatay first argues that the ban is presumptively unlawful because the plain text of the Second Amendment protects the right to possess LCMs. He then argues that California had failed to articulate a relevant historical firearms restriction analogous to the current ban. Accordingly, Judge Bumatay would find the law unconstitutional.

=== Judge VanDyke's dissenting opinion ===
Judge VanDyke authored a dissenting opinion in which he also associated himself with the opinion of Judge Bumatay. He also wrote to highlight his concerns with the majority's application of Bruen. VanDyke disagreed with the majority's extensive inquiry into whether or not LCMs are "arms" within the meaning of the Second Amendment. To supplement his written opinion, Judge VanDyke also created a video of himself demonstrating this conceptual point, namely that the term "arms" should be construed broadly to encompass an almost-limitless set of configurations. He also agreed with Judge Bumatay's assessment of step two of Bruen, noting that California had not identified a relevant historical analog to its modern ban.

Judge VanDyke also addressed Judge Berzon's concurring opinion, arguing that his video dissent serves only to supplement his written opinion, and that his video only served to address a conceptual argument (namely, the arm/not-an-arm inquiry), rather than a factual one.

=== Petition for certiorari ===
On August 15, 2025, the plaintiffs filed a petition for a writ of certiorari with the Supreme Court of the United States. The petition asks the Court to consider whether California’s ban on large-capacity magazines violates the Second Amendment and whether the ban constitutes a taking without compensation under the Fifth Amendment. The filing followed deadline extensions granted by Justice Elena Kagan in her capacity as Circuit Justice for the Ninth Circuit.
