= Pistol grip =

Handle for a firearm or other tool

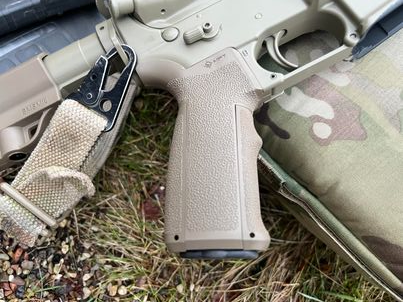
Pistol grip of an AR-15-pattern rifle

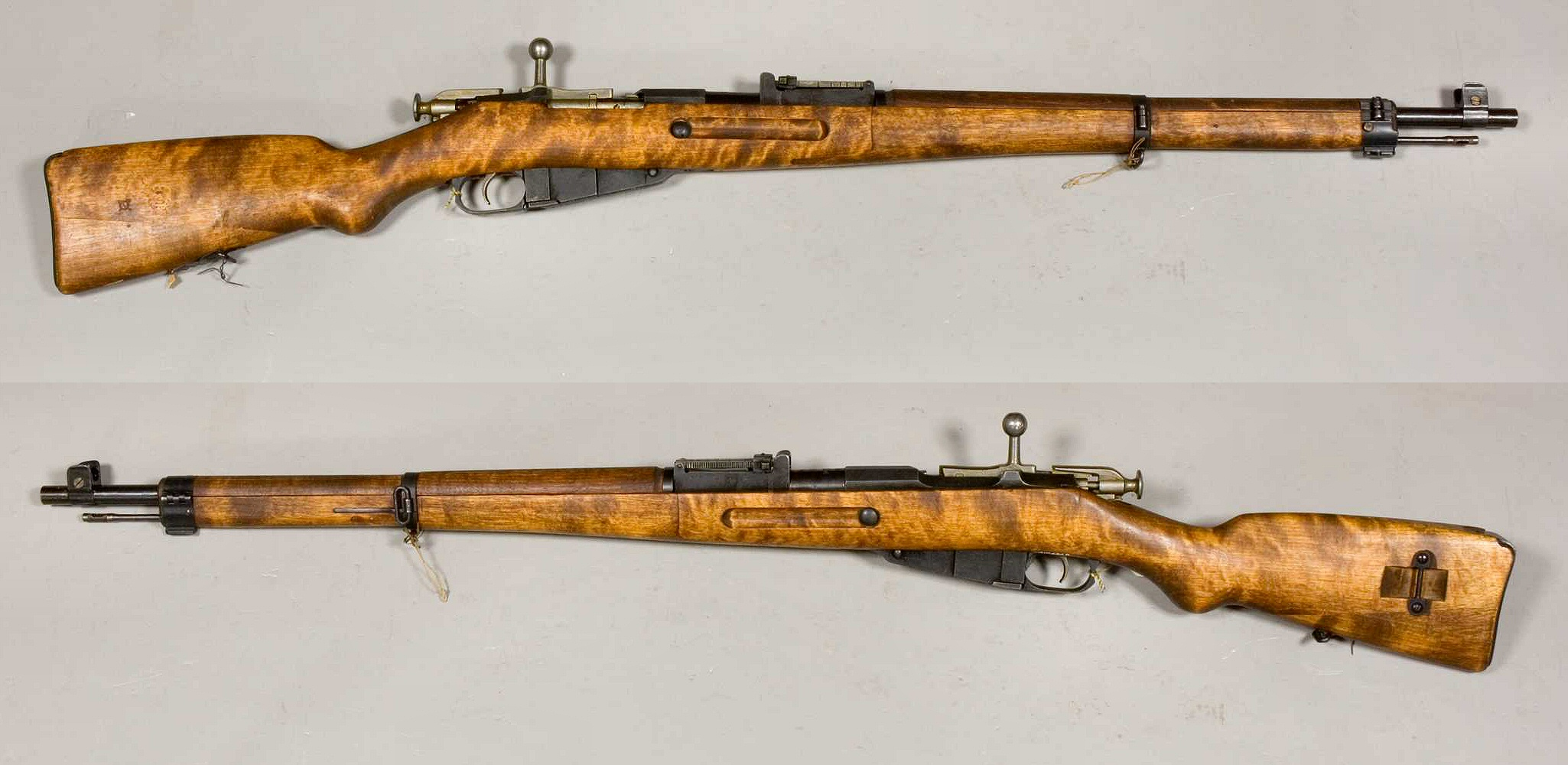
Stock with semi-pistol grip on a Finnish M39 Mosin–Nagant rifle.

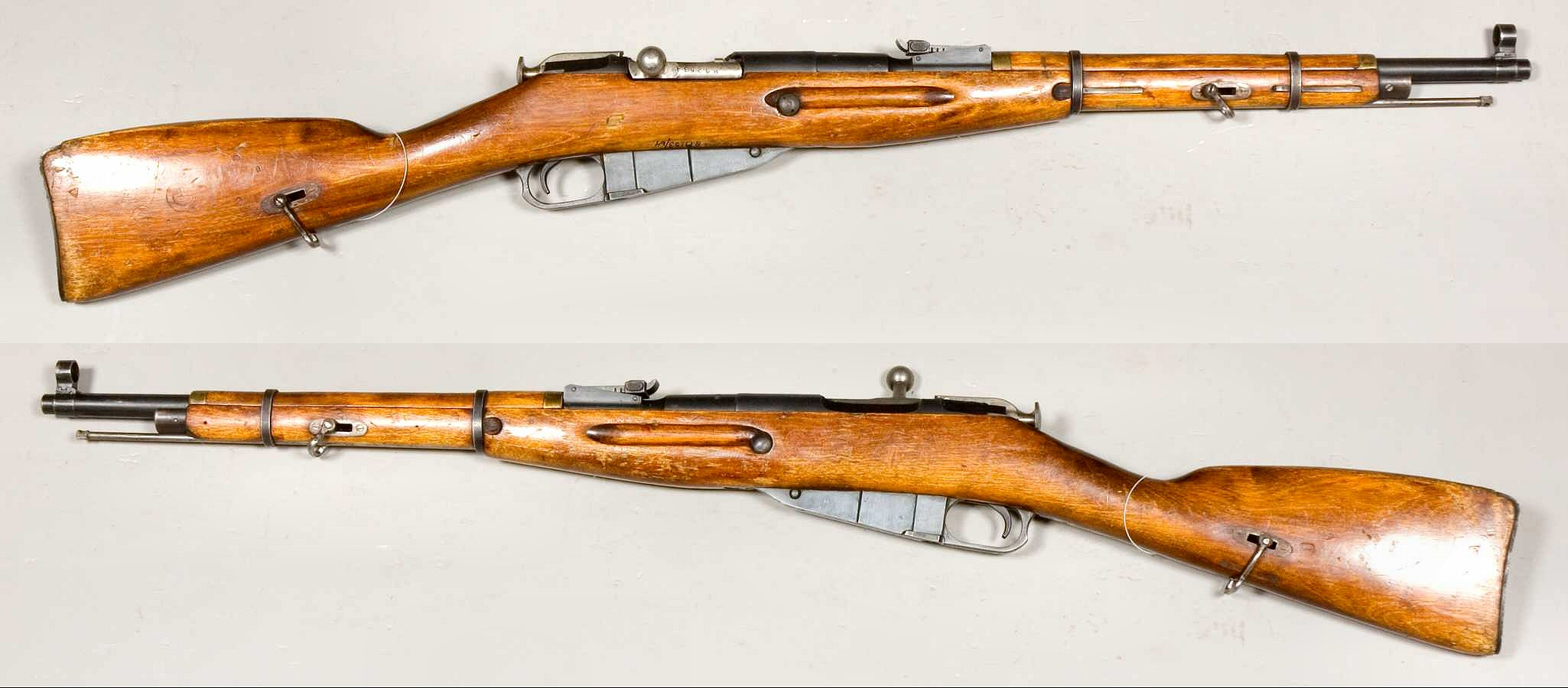
Straight or English stock (non-pistol grip) on a Soviet M38 Mosin–Nagant carbine.

Examples of semi-pistol grips and non-pistol grips

On a firearm or other tools, a pistol grip is a distinctly protruded handle underneath the main mechanism, to be held by the user's hand at a more vertical (and thus more ergonomic) angle, similar to how one would hold a conventional pistol.

In firearms, the pistol grip is located behind the trigger and generally held by the hand that operates the trigger. Rifles and shotguns without pistol grips are generally referred to as having "straight" or "upland" (shotguns only) style stocks. Some firearms, starting from a 1840s Belgian carbine, and some automatic weapons in the 20th century (e. g., Chauchat MG, Thompson submachine gun, AK-47 assault rifle), have a second frontal pistol grip (or foregrip) on the firearm's fore-end to be used by the support hand for better stability in operation.

Pistol grips can also serve multiple functions, such as a magazine housing (in semi-automatic pistols), bipod (in some foregrips) or tool storage device (for spare batteries, gun oil/cleaner, hex keys, etc.). In few firearms, like the Finnish Kk 62 light machine gun, the pistol grip is also used as a handle to charge the weapon.

Pistol grips are regarded as a defining feature in United States gun law. Pistol grips that protrude below the weapon but are not integrated with the shoulder stock (i.e. as part of a thumbhole stock) are currently regulated in some states and were regulated by the now-expired Federal Assault Weapons Ban. California-legal alternatives to pistol grips, a configuration prohibited by the Assault Weapons Control Act of 1989, include the fin grip, which takes the form of a plate that extends from the rear of the pistol grip.

Tools with pistol-style grips run the range from hand tools such as bar clamps and hand saws, to power tools such as electric drills and pneumatic surgical sternal saws. Often the word "gun" appears in the name of pistol gripped tools such as the glue gun, caulking gun and nail gun. Spray painters and grinders also often include this feature for added precision control.

Early-20th-century cavalry swords, such as the Pattern 1908 cavalry sword, used a curved pistol-style grip, as do many swords used in modern sport fencing. There are many types of pistol grips used in fencing.

One of the reasons that pistol-style grips are so common in machinery is because it is possible to ergonomically position the operating controls for use with minimal hand movement. For example, on self-loading rifles such as the AR-15 and M16 rifle, the user's grip hand can manipulate the trigger and magazine release with only the index finger, while using the thumb to control the safety or selector switch, all without needing to remove the palm from the grip.

A drill with a pistol grip.

== See also ==
- Drop handlebars
- Glossary of firearms terms
