= Peruta v. San Diego County =

- Court: United States Court of Appeals for the Ninth Circuit
- Full case name: Edward Peruta et al v. County of San Diego et al.
- Decided: June 9, 2016
- Citation: 824 F.3d 919

Case history
- Prior history: Peruta v. Cty. of San Diego, 758 F. Supp. 2d 1106 (S.D. Cal. 2010), reversed, 742 F.3d 1144 (9th Cir. 2014); Richards v. Cty. of Yolo, 821 F. Supp. 2d 1169 (E.D. Cal. 2011), reversed, 742 F.3d 1144 (9th Cir. 2014)
- Subsequent history: Cert. denied, 137 S. Ct. 1995 (2017).

Court membership
- Judges sitting: Chief Circuit Judge Sidney R. Thomas; Senior Circuit Judge Harry Pregerson; Circuit Judges Barry G. Silverman, Susan P. Graber, M. Margaret McKeown, William A. Fletcher, Richard Paez. Consuelo Callahan, Carlos Bea, N. Randy Smith, and John B. Owens

Case opinions
- Majority: Fletcher, joined by Thomas, Pregerson, Graber, McKeown, Paez, Owens
- Concurrence: Graber, joined by Thomas, McKeown
- Dissent: Callahan, joined by Silverman (in part), Bea (in full), Smith (in part)
- Dissent: Silverman, joined by Bea
- Dissent: Smith

Laws applied
- Second Amendment
- Abrogated by
- New York State Rifle & Pistol Association, Inc. v. Bruen (2022)

Keywords
- Concealed carry; Right to keep and bear arms; Second Amendment

Peruta v. San Diego, 824 F.3d 919 (9th Cir. 2016), was a decision of the United States Court of Appeals for the Ninth Circuit pertaining to the legality of San Diego County's restrictive policy regarding requiring documentation of "good cause" that "distinguish[es] the applicant from the mainstream and places the applicant in harm's way" (Cal. Pen. Code §§ 26150, 26155) before issuing a concealed carry permit.

After an initial ruling (2-1) in 2014 that held that the Second Amendment to the United States Constitution protected the right to carry a concealed weapon, the court reheard the case en banc, ultimately reversing the lower court ruling, saying that "there is no Second Amendment right for members of the general public to carry concealed firearms in public." While the ruling technically applied to all states and territories under the jurisdiction of the Ninth Circuit, it only applied to California and Hawaii in practice because the remaining states in the Ninth Circuit's area of responsibility have either Shall-Issue licensing policies or allow concealed carry without a permit.

The case was appealed to the United States Supreme Court, which in June 2017 denied the writ of certiorari, leaving the Ninth Circuit's en banc opinion in place. On June 23, 2022, the Supreme Court ruled in NYSPRA v. Bruen that the "good cause" requirement was unconstitutional.

== Reasoning ==
The court reviewed the history of gun control cases in which laws forbidding the concealed carry of weapons were involved. They covered a time period from 1299 (in England) to the late 1800s US Supreme Court. The majority opinion was that there was an "overwhelming consensus" of historical case decisions establishing that there was never a time in history when courts believed that states could not prohibit concealed carry. Consequently, they concluded it could not be a violation of the long-standing interpretation of the Second Amendment.

The minority argued that a prohibition on concealed carry for the general public, accompanied by a similar prohibition on open carry, was a de facto gun ban, and therefore is unconstitutional under District of Columbia v. Heller.

== Details ==
Under San Diego's policy, a typical citizen in San Diego County cannot bear arms in public for self-defense because by San Diego's definition, typical citizens cannot distinguish [themselves] from the mainstream and receive concealed carry permits (Peruta v. San Diego (9th Cir, 02-13-14) p. 54.). Although prior to January 1, 2012, it was legal to openly carry an unloaded handgun in public, in October 2011 Governor Jerry Brown signed a bill that modifies the law on openly carrying an unloaded firearm to match the restrictions for openly carrying a loaded weapon, effectively prohibiting (in all but limited circumstances) the open carry of firearms whether loaded or unloaded. (Cal. Pen. Code §§ 25850, 26155.) Thus, the court found San Diego County's restrictive policy in combination with California's denial of open carry ultimately resulted in the destruction of the typical law-abiding, responsible citizen's right to bear arms in any manner in public, thereby violating the Second Amendment of the United States Constitution.

== History ==
The February 13, 2014 decision is written by Diarmuid O'Scannlain, with Consuelo María Callahan joining and Sidney Runyan Thomas dissenting, and affirmed the right of responsible, law-abiding citizens to carry a handgun in public for lawful self-defense. The primary plaintiff, Edward Peruta, was represented by attorneys Paul Neuharth Jr. from San Diego and Chuck Michel from Long Beach.

On February 27, 2014 California Attorney General Kamala Harris filed a petition for en banc review of the decision. As the state was not a formal party of the case, her action is not an appeal, but merely a request that the full court re-hear the case en-banc on its own initiative (sua sponte). The court denied Harris's petition on November 12, 2014.

On December 3, 2014, the Ninth Circuit announced that a judge on the circuit made a sua sponte call for a vote on whether the case should be reheard en banc. The court gave the parties, and any Amici curiae, 21 days to file briefs setting forth their positions whether the case should be reheard en banc.

On March 26, 2015, the Ninth Circuit announced that they would hear the case, along with Richards v. Prieto, en banc, including setting aside the original rulings in the cases and stating that they were not to be used as case law. The cases were argued on June 16, 2015.

On June 9, 2016, the en banc court reversed the lower court ruling, saying that "there is no Second Amendment right for members of the general public to carry concealed firearms in public." The en banc ruling did not address the constitutionality of restrictions on open carry, leaving that matter open to potential future litigation.

On June 23, 2016, the plaintiff-appellants petitioned the Ninth Circuit for a full-court re-hearing. On August 15, 2016, the Ninth Circuit denied the petition for a full-court en banc rehearing.

On January 12, 2017, the plaintiffs filed a petition for a writ of certiorari with the Supreme Court.

On June 26, 2017, the Supreme Court denied the writ, with Justice Thomas, joined by Justice Gorsuch, dissenting:

We should have granted certiorari in this case. The approach taken by the en banc court is indefensible, and the petition raises important questions that this Court should address. I see no reason to await another case. ... [T]he Second Amendment's core purpose further supports this conclusion that the right to bear arms extends to public carry. The Court in Heller emphasized that "self-defense" is "the central component of the [Second Amendment] right itself." ... The Court's decision to deny certiorari in this case reflects a distressing trend: the treatment of the Second Amendment as a disfavored right. ... I do not think we should stand by idly while a State denies its citizens that right, particularly when their very lives may depend on it. I respectfully dissent.

== Reactions ==
The San Diego County Sheriff's Department issued a press release on February 21, 2014, stating it will not seek review of the decision by the entire membership of judges sitting in the Ninth Circuit, and that, "Should the decision of the Ninth Circuit become final, the Sheriff's Department will begin to issue CCW's in situations where the applicant has met all other lawful qualifications and has requested a CCW for purposes of self-defense."

As a result of the court's original decision in 2014, the Orange County Sheriff's Department has loosened requirements for obtaining a concealed carry permit. Instead of requiring the applicant to have "good cause," the applicant need only to assert that a permit is needed for self-defense or personal safety.

== Related cases ==
=== Scocca v. Smith ===
Scocca v. Smith – In 2008, Tom Scocca, a former law enforcement officer, applied for a concealed-carry permit from Santa Clara County Sheriff Laurie Smith, and was denied because he could not show "good cause." Scocca sued Smith, and the case was put on hold pending decisions in San Diego and Yolo County cases, and has since been dismissed.

=== Richards v. Prieto ===
In addition to Peruta, the same judges heard the Richards v. Prieto case at the same time, which challenged the handgun carry license policy of Yolo County Sheriff Ed Prieto. The case originally was entitled Sykes v. McGinness and included Sacramento County's then-sheriff, John McGinness, as a defendant. Sacramento County changed its licensing policy during the lawsuit, and the complaint against McGinness was dismissed.

After ruling on Peruta, the Ninth Circuit judges unanimously ruled in Richards:

In light of our holding in [Peruta] we conclude that the district court in this case erred in ruling Richard[s'] motion for summary judgment because the Yolo County policy impermissibly infringes on the Second Amendment right to bear arms in lawful self-defense.

=== Baker v. Kealoha ===
In addition to Peruta, the same judges heard the Baker v. Kealoha case at the same time, which challenged the handgun carry law in Hawaii. After ruling on Peruta, the Ninth Circuit judges in a 2–1 vote ruled in Baker:

In light of our disposition of the same issue in [Peruta] we conclude that the district court made an error of law when it concluded the Hawaii statutes at issue did not implicate protected conduct.

=== NYSRPA v. Bruen ===
On June 23, 2022, the Supreme Court issued a decision in New York State Rifle & Pistol Association, Inc. v. Bruen, holding that New York's requirement that carry permit applicants demonstrate a good reason to require a permit was unconstitutional. The following week, the California Attorney General directed state law enforcement authorities to cease enforcement of California's own good cause restriction. As a result, the state is shall-issue, but the ease of acquiring a permit has yet to be determined as the Attorney General emphasized that issuing authorities may continue to enforce the good moral character requirement in a manner the objective nature of which is unknown.

== See also ==
- Concealed carry in the United States
- Firearm case law in the United States
- Gun laws in California
- Gun law in the United States
