= Linda Lopez (judge) =

American judge (born 1968)

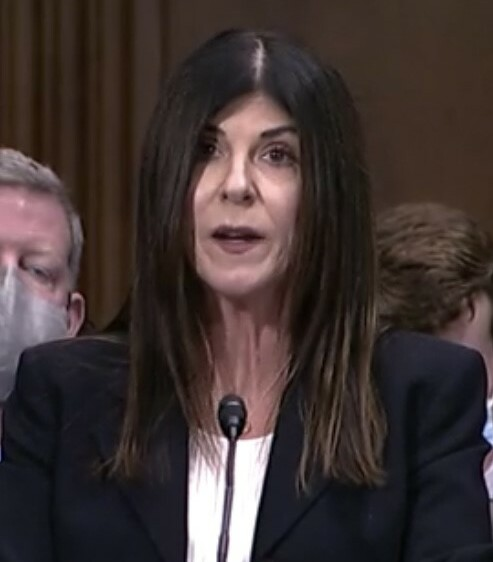

Judge of the United States District Court for the Southern District of California
- Incumbent
- Assumed office December 21, 2021
- Appointed by: Joe Biden
- Preceded by: Roger Benitez

Magistrate Judge of the United States District Court for the Southern District of California
- In office October 26, 2018 – December 21, 2021

Personal details
- Born: 1968 (age 57–58) Miami Beach, Florida, U.S.
- Education: Miami Dade College (AS, AA); Florida International University (BA); University of Miami (JD)

Linda Lopez (born 1968) is an American attorney serving as a United States district judge of the United States District Court for the Southern District of California. She previously served as a magistrate judge of the same court.

== Early life and education ==
The child of Cuban immigrants, Lopez was born in Miami, Florida and raised in the nearby suburb of Hialeah. She earned an Associate of Arts in and Associate of Science degree from Miami Dade College, a Bachelor of Arts from Florida International University in 1996, and a Juris Doctor from the University of Miami School of Law in 1999.

== Career ==
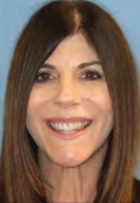
Lopez as a magistrate judge (2018)

Lopez began her career as a criminal defense attorney in Florida, working both at a firm and as a solo practitioner. In 2007, she relocated to San Diego, where she joined the Office of the Federal Public Defender as a senior trial attorney.

=== United States magistrate judge ===
Lopez was sworn in as a magistrate judge for the Southern District of California on October 26, 2018.

=== District court service ===
On September 30, 2021, President Joe Biden nominated Lopez to be a United States district judge of the United States District Court for the Southern District of California. President Biden nominated Lopez to the seat vacated by Judge Roger Benitez, who assumed senior status on December 31, 2017. On November 3, 2021, a hearing on her nomination was held before the Senate Judiciary Committee. On December 2, 2021, her nomination was reported out of committee by a 12–10 vote. On December 17, 2021, the United States Senate invoked cloture on her nomination by a 47–30 vote. Her nomination was confirmed later that day by a 48–25 vote. She received her judicial commission on December 21, 2021. At the time of her appointment, she was the only Latina on the Southern District of California. She was later joined by Judge Ruth Bermudez Montenegro in 2022.

== See also ==
- List of Hispanic and Latino American jurists

Legal offices
Preceded by Roger Benitez	Judge of the United States District Court for the Southern District of California; 2021–present	Incumbent
