= Roberti–Roos Assault Weapons Control Act of 1989 =

California legislation regarding assault weapons

The Roberti–Roos Assault Weapons Control Act of 1989 (AWCA) is a California law that bans the ownership and transfer of over 50 specific brands and models of firearms, which were classified as assault weapons. Most were rifles, but some were pistols and shotguns. The law was amended in 1999 to classify assault weapons by features of the firearm. Firearms that were legally owned at the time the law was passed were grandfathered if they were registered with the California Department of Justice. The law was overturned in June 2021 in Miller v. Bonta; the ruling is stayed pending appeal.

== Proponents ==
The act was a direct response to the deaths of five schoolchildren in the Cleveland Elementary School shooting in Stockton that year. The co-author of the legislation, California State Senate President pro tem David Roberti, found himself the subject of a recall attempt by the gun lobby in 1994. He survived that, but later that year lost a Democratic primary election for the office of California State Treasurer. The loss was considered a result of the immense campaign finance costs of defending against the recall, and the draining of those finances. Assembly Speaker pro tem, Mike Roos who retired in 1991, was the other co-author.

== California penal code categories ==
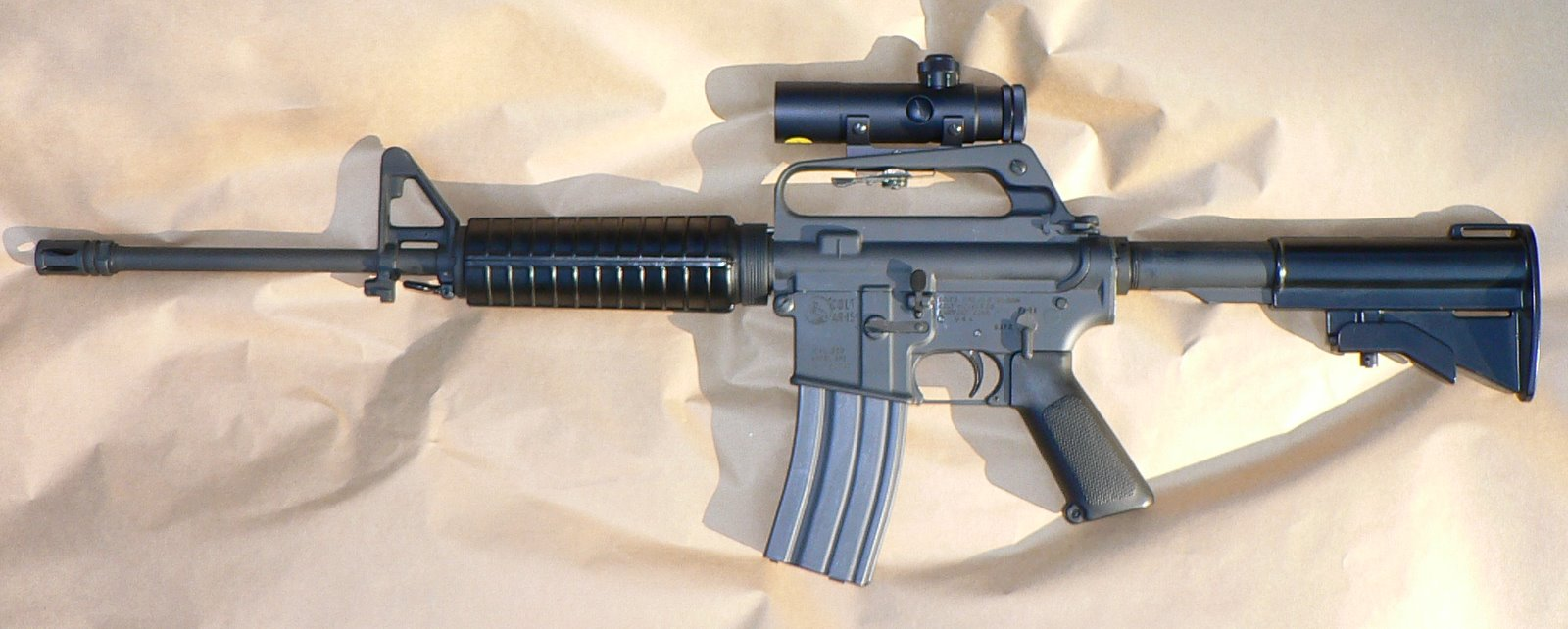
The Colt AR-15 Sporter SP1 Carbine is a semi-automatic rifle that is classified as an assault weapon under California law.

Firearms are identified as assault weapons by statute in Penal Code sections §30510 and §30515.

- The original Roberti–Roos assault weapons list identified assault weapons by make and model in Penal Code §30510. The law originally was numbered § Penal Code 12276 was passed into law in 1989. It was renumbered in 2010 with the identical text.
- In 1999, Penal Code § 12276.1 was added to California State Law ("SB23"), defining assault weapons by characteristics. This law was renumbered in 2010 to the current Penal Code § 30515.
- In 2016, Penal Code § 30515 was amended following the San Bernardino Terrorist Attack. The characteristics used to identify assault weapons in pistols and rifles changed to ban the "bullet-button" feature: "nondetachable" magazines were no longer considerable as "fixed' magazines.
- In 2020, Penal Code § 30515 was amended the characteristics of shotguns in order to ban the "bullet-button" feature. Sub-sections 9, 10, and 11 were added to address "Other" (ATF Title 1) firearms that did not fall under the classification of pistol, rifle, or shotgun.

The Roberti–Roos Assault Weapons Control Act of 1989 was augmented in 1999 with SB23. It also inspired follow-on legislation such as .50 Caliber BMG Regulation Act of 2004 and further restrictions on semi-automatic firearms. From the website of the California Attorney General's office:

Effective January 1, 2000, Senate Bill 23, Statutes of 1999, establishes new criteria for defining assault weapons based on generic characteristics. This bill allows and requires persons who own/possess firearms that fall under the new "assault weapon" definition to register those firearms with the Department of Justice during the one-year period between January 1, 2000 and December 31, 2000. Effective January 1, 2000, this bill adds Penal Code Section 12276.1 to the Penal Code.

== Firearms prohibited by make and model ==
The following designated semiautomatic firearms are defined as assault weapons by Penal Code section 30510:
(a) The following specified rifles:

(1) All AK series including, but not limited to, the models identified as follows:

(A) Made in China AK, AKM, AKS, AK47, AK47S, AK56, AK56S, AK84S, and AK86S.
(B) Norinco 56, 56S, 84S, and 86S.
(C) Poly Technologies AKS and AK47.
(D) MAADI AK47 and ARM.

(2) IMI Uzi and Galil.
(3) Beretta AR-70.
(4) CETME Sporter.
(5) Colt AR-15 series.
(6) Daewoo K-1, K-2, Max 1, Max 2, AR 100, and AR110C.
(7) Fabrique Nationale FAL, LAR, FNC, 308 Match, and Sporter.
(8) MAS 223.
(9) Heckler & Koch HK-91, HK-93, HK-94, and HK-PSG-1.
(10) The following MAC types:

(A) RPB Industries Inc, sM10 and sM11.
(B) SWD Incorporated M11.

(11) SKS with detachable magazine.
(12) SIG AMT, PE-57, SG 550, and SG 551.
(13) Springfield Armory BM59 and SAR-48.
(14) Sterling MK-6.
(15) Steyr AUG.
(16) Valmet M62S, M71S, and M78S.
(17) Armalite AR-180.
(18) Calico M-900.
(19) J&R ENG M-68.
(20) Weaver Arms Nighthawk.

(b) The following specified pistols:

(1) IMI UZI.
(2) Encom MP-9 and MP-45.
(3) The following MAC types:

(A) RPB Industries Inc, sM10 and sM11.
(B) SWD Incorporated M-11.
(C) Advance Armament Inc. M-11.
(D) Military Armament Corp. Ingram —11.

(4) Intratec TEC-9.
(5) Sites Spectre.
(6) Sterling MK-7.
(7) Calico M-950.
(8) Bushmaster Pistol.

(c) The following specified shotguns:

(1) Franchi SPAS 12 and LAW 12.
(2) Striker 12.
(3) The Streetsweeper type S/S Inc, SS/12. (see Striker)

== Firearms prohibited by configuration ==
Other firearms are banned from sale or possession by certain characteristics or configuration as determined by parts or features. If an undefined firearm is modified with any of the following characteristics, it can subsequently be classified as a banned assault weapon. These are as given in Penal Code section 12276.1 and 30515:

(1) A semiautomatic, centerfire rifle that does not have a fixed magazine but has any one of the following:

(A) A pistol grip that protrudes conspicuously beneath the action of the weapon.
(B) A thumbhole stock.
(C) A folding or telescoping stock.
(D) A grenade launcher or flare launcher.
(E) A flash suppressor.
(F) A forward pistol grip.

(2) A semiautomatic, centerfire rifle that has a fixed magazine with the capacity to accept more than 10 rounds.
(3) A semiautomatic, centerfire rifle that has an overall length of less than 30 inches [762 mm].
(4) A semiautomatic pistol that does not have a fixed magazine but has any one of the following:

(A) A threaded barrel, capable of accepting a flash suppressor, forward handgrip, or silencer (suppressor).
(B) A second handgrip.
(C) A shroud that is attached to, or partially or completely encircles, the barrel that allows the bearer to fire the weapon without burning his or her hand, except a slide that encloses the barrel.
(D) The capacity to accept a detachable magazine at some location outside of the pistol grip.

(5) A semiautomatic pistol with a fixed magazine that has the capacity to accept more than 10 rounds.
(6) A semiautomatic shotgun that has both of the following:

(A) A folding or telescoping stock.
(B) A pistol grip that protrudes conspicuously beneath the action of the weapon, thumbhole stock, or vertical handgrip.

(7) A semiautomatic shotgun that does not have a fixed magazine.
(8) Any shotgun with a revolving cylinder.
(9) A semiautomatic centerfire firearm that is not a rifle, pistol, or shotgun, that does not have a fixed magazine, but that has any one of the following:

(A) A pistol grip that protrudes conspicuously beneath the action of the weapon.
(B) A thumbhole stock.
(C) A folding or telescoping stock.
(D) A grenade launcher or flare launcher.
(E) A flash suppressor.
(F) A forward pistol grip.
(G) A threaded barrel, capable of accepting a flash suppressor, forward handgrip, or silencer.
(H) A second handgrip.
(I) A shroud that is attached to, or partially or completely encircles, the barrel that allows the bearer to fire the weapon without burning the bearer’s hand, except a slide that encloses the barrel.
(J) The capacity to accept a detachable magazine at some location outside of the pistol grip.

(10) A semiautomatic centerfire firearm that is not a rifle, pistol, or shotgun, that has a fixed magazine with the capacity to accept more than 10 rounds.
(11) A semiautomatic centerfire firearm that is not a rifle, pistol, or shotgun, that has an overall length of less than 30 inches.
(b) For purposes of this section, “fixed magazine” means an ammunition feeding device contained in, or permanently attached to, a firearm in such a manner that the device cannot be removed without disassembly of the firearm action.

The amended legislation included the following:

(A) "Assault weapon" does not include any antique firearm.
(B) The following definitions shall apply under this section:

1. "Magazine" shall mean any ammunition feeding device.
2. "Capacity to accept more than 10 rounds" shall mean capable of accommodating more than 10 rounds, but shall not be construed to include a feeding device that has been permanently altered so that it cannot accommodate more than 10 rounds.
3. "Antique firearm" means any firearm manufactured prior to January 1, 1899.

== Related court cases ==
=== Kasler v. Lockyer ===
The California Supreme Court handed down its decision in Kasler v. Lockyer in August 2000. The original suit, in the mid-1990s, challenged the constitutionality of California's 1989 Roberti–Roos assault weapons ban. The Court found in favor of the defendants, Attorney General Bill Lockyer and the State of California; one resulting aspect of this decision was that the AWCA '89 "series" terminology used for AR and AK type weapons applied to all similar weapons, regardless of nomenclature (manufacturer, model number, version, variant, etc.).

The result of the Kasler v. Lockyer was a list of AR and AK-style firearms that are banned in California by name. These firearms include the Armalite AR-15, Bushmaster XM-15, Colt AR-15, Kalashnikov USA Hunter Rifle, MAADI CO AK-47, ARM, MISR, and MISTR, to name a few. There are a total of 84 firearms that are banned by name on this list.

While the SB23 "by features" assault weapons registration window was open throughout 2000, the Kasler decision (whose case was filed several years prior) triggered DOJ to open a 90-day overlapping registration window for "series" guns - regardless of configured features suite - ending 31 Dec 2000. However, due to a printing error in the Secretary of State's office - related to "12/31" morphing into "01/23" - the Kasler registration window with California DOJ for AR/AK "series" guns was administratively extended to 23 Jan 2001.

=== Harrott v. Kings County ===
In June 2001, the California Supreme Court handed down its decision in Harrott v. County of Kings (No. S055064, 25 P.3d 649 (Cal. 2001), contravening portions of the Kasler decision. This determined the following:

a) Determination of "series" membership is difficult enough that, for due process clarity, owners and law enforcement should merely have to consult a list of specific makes and models (in California Code of Regulation) to know if their gun is a prohibited firearm.

b) Trial courts cannot determine if a given firearm/receiver is of the AR or AK "series". Prohibited weapons in AR/AK "series" must be specifically identified by make and model, and the Department of Justice (DOJ) must promulgate this list.

c) DOJ has authority to 'identify' and promulgate new members of the AR & AK "series" itself, only. This authority is limited solely to AR and AK series firearms/receivers.

d) DOJ cannot prohibit, on its own, other firearms outside the AR/AK series; Harrott only addresses "series" membership clarity.

e) The original "add-on" procedure - where the DOJ (Attorney General) filed in certain superior courts (as originally specified in PC 12275.5) - was nullified by passage of AB2728 in 2006, becoming active 1 Jan 2007. After that date, the only way to ban specific non-AR/AK semiautomatic firearms as 'assault weapons' by make/model listing is via creation & passage of new legislation. [No such new legislation has been created; the SB23 (as amended) features ban is the primary method of restricting 'assault weapons' in California.] The DOJ/AG cannot alone assert "series" membership for any other weapons type because the term "series" was solely used in the Roberti-Roos statute for AR and AK firearms.

f) DOJ determinations of AR/AK "series" membership are subject to challenge and verification.

=== Miller v. Bonta ===
On June 4, 2021, Senior Judge Roger Benitez of the United States District Court for the Southern District of California ruled that the Act was an unconstitutional restriction on Second Amendment rights. The ruling was stayed for 30 days pending appeal. On 29 Aug 2022, in a proceeding also held before Judge Roger T. Benitez, both parties have 45 days to file simultaneous additional briefs and 15 days thereafter to file responsive briefs in light of NYSRPA v. Bruen. The Court will then decide whether to schedule any hearings or decide the case on the record.

== Rifles ==
=== Fixed-magazine rifle ===
This style of rifle is made by combining an AR-15 upper receiver with an AR-15 lower receiver which has not been banned by specific name, and which has a fixed, non-detachable 10-round (maximum, anything above 10 is a felony) magazine. In such a configuration, otherwise prohibited features such as a telescoping stock, pistol grip, and flash hider may be present. While formerly prohibited under the now-expired federal assault weapon ban of 1994–2004, the presence of a bayonet lug is not prohibited by California state law and can be present on firearms without violation. However, the magazine cannot be detachable, so to load the rifle the shooter must "top load" or load into a special fixed magazine compliance device which has a special loading slot. To top-load, the shooter pulls the rear takedown pin, hinges the upper receiver on the front pivot pin, and loads the now exposed magazine.

Until 2016, bullet button magazine lock devices were available which replaced the magazine release button. These "bullet button" devices had an inset pin requiring use of a special tool to release the magazine, thereby, disallowing a readily "detachable magazine", to be compliant with California state firearms law. With the advent of SB880 in 2016 (and a required registration window in 2017), guns using a "bullet button" as a compliance device transitioned into 'assault weapon' status. Future guns sold legally in CA would require a true fixed magazine, and not merely one that is "nondetachable."

California Code of Regulations 5471

(p) “Fixed magazine” means an ammunition feeding device contained in, or permanently attached to, a firearm in such a manner that the device cannot be removed without disassembly of the firearm action.

=== Featureless rifle ===
If a rifle has none of the prohibited features (pistol grip, telescoping or folding stock, flash hider, grenade/flare launcher, forward pistol grip), there are several products available on the market to configure featureless rifles.

The California DOJ Bureau of Firearms has attested under oath that the U-15 stock, the Hammerhead Grip and the MonsterMan Grip do not constitute a pistol grip and are therefore legal when used on a detachable magazine semiautomatic centerfire rifle with none of the other features listed in CA PC 30515(a)(1-11). The Thordsen Customs stock has similar attributes to the devices above, and the owner Alan Thordsen reports CA DOJ has allowed registered assault weapons to be 'de-registered' when re-configured with his product.

The specific definitions for assault weapon features are listed in the California Code of Regulations 5471; other definitions are not applicable.

=== Off-list lower receivers ===
Most AR-15 and many AK manufacturers now make lower receivers which qualify as "Off-List" Lower (OLL) receivers which are legal to possess and use in the state of California. Before trying to acquire one, ensure that it's not marked with any make/model combination appearing on the Roberti-Roos list (30510 PC) or its regulatory echo in 11 CCR 5495, or in the "Kasler list", 11 CCR 5499.

== See also ==
- Assault weapons legislation in the United States
- Gun laws in California
- Gun laws in the United States by state
- Gun politics in the United States
