= Firearms Policy Coalition =

US gun rights organization

- Founded: 2013
- Tax ID no.: 47-2460415
- Legal status: 501(c)(4)
- Headquarters: Sacramento, CA
- President: Brandon Combs
- Website: firearmspolicy.org

The Firearms Policy Coalition (FPC) is a gun rights organization in the United States, which aims to advance gun rights in the United States via legal action, in keeping with its stated goal to "restore the essential right to keep and bear arms in the United States." The FPC seeks to approach gun rights advocacy in a more targeted and effective way than the National Rifle Association of America (NRA), specifically by working with targeted legal teams to advance legislation in support of gun rights causes.

California governor Gavin Newsom has described the FPC as a "...leading pro-gun group."

== History ==
The Firearms Policy Coalition (FPC) was founded in 2013 and is headquartered in Sacramento, California. It has been labeled by the Washington Examiner as one of, "the new 'pro-gun rights organization[s]'..." that began to spring up around 2012-2013, as the power of the NRA began to change and as new calls for gun control legislation arose after the Sandy Hook Elementary School shooting in 2012.

Brandon Combs is the president of the FPC.

== Activities ==
The Firearms Policy Coalition is a 501(c)(4) nonprofit organization. Its legal team, FPC Law, bills itself as, "...the nation's first and largest public interest legal team focused on the right to keep and bear arms," and states that "the primary objective of our legal action programs is to bring cases that protect your rights and property, restore individual liberty, and help us achieve our purpose to create a world of maximal individual liberty."

The FPC has worked on several high-profile federal gun-rights cases in the early 2020s and frequently works with other gun rights advocacy organizations such as, Gun Owners of America (GOA) and the Second Amendment Foundation (SAF). The FPC was an unsuccessful co-appellant in VanDerStok v. Garland, a 2023 Supreme Court case about whether a kit to make a privately made firearm is legally itself a firearm. The FPC is also a co-litigant in Mock v. Garland, a lawsuit related to the legality of pistol braces. As of 2023, the 5th circuit court of appeals had granted an injunction in favor of the FPC's position and remanded the case to the district court for further consideration. An injunction from the district court specifically exempted FPC members from the ban while the litigation was ongoing.

The FPC has also carried out extensive litigation related to state gun laws. Gun laws passed while Gavin Newsom was governor of California that further restricted when and where a legal gun owner could carry or possess firearms was challenged in 2023 by the FPC stating, "...that in the now stated 'sensitive' areas it is unconstitutional to take away the firearms of law-abiding citizens residing in the identified zones." In 2023, the FPC sued the state of Oregon regarding a gun law called Measure 114. After the New York State Rifle & Pistol Association, Inc. v. Bruen ("Bruen decision"), the FPC has been active in bringing lawsuits against state governments that have failed to follow the guidance put forth by the Supreme Court Bruen decision.

During the COVID-19 pandemic, Adam Kraut, then director of legal strategy at the FPC became involved in litigation over the mandatory closure by state and local governments of businesses, and in particular gun stores, not deemed essential.

In addition to advocating for less restrictions on gun ownership in the United States, the FPC also states in its mission that it works to lessen restrictions on "blades" as well as "Other defensive arms," and has been involved in civil liberties litigation in areas adjacent to firearms policy but unrelated to the second amendment itself. The FPC has raised first amendment issues on behalf of a high-school student wearing an FPC patch depicting a rifle, who was instructed by school administration to remove the patch, and has been noted for its opposition to delegating law enforcement powers to private citizens in the fear that those powers would be used to target gun ownership.

In June 2024, the Supreme Court of the United States (SCOTUS) issued a ruling that the ATF had wrongly reinterpreted a rule and therefore unconstitutionally overstepped its authority when in 2017 the agency had reinterpreted a rule at the request of the Trump administration to make bump stocks illegal. The FPC had been actively involved in this case, and president Brandon Combs issued a statement on June 14, 2024, following the successful ruling from the SCOTUS in support of gun rights:

This decision helps rein in an out-of-control federal government that has no respect for the People of the United States or our rights. The President cannot change the law to fit his policy preferences and the ATF cannot be turned into his personal gestapo. We fought President Trump’s lawless and unconstitutional actions from day one. And the Supreme Court’s decision today proves we were right all along.

=== Funding ===
The FPC is primarily funded by numerous small individual donors, but does receive some larger gifts from corporate sponsors, including members of the gun manufacturing industry such as Henry Repeating Arms, which made a donation to the FPC of $25,000 in 2023.

== See also ==
- National Association for Gun Rights
- Gun law in the United States
- Gun politics in the United States
- Second Amendment to the United States Constitution
