= William Q. Hayes =

American judge (born 1956)

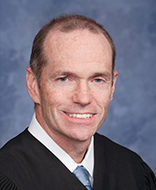

Senior Judge of the United States District Court for the Southern District of California
- Incumbent
- Assumed office August 1, 2021

Judge of the United States District Court for the Southern District of California
- In office October 6, 2003 – August 1, 2021
- Appointed by: George W. Bush
- Preceded by: Seat established by 116 Stat. 1758
- Succeeded by: vacant

Personal details
- Born: William Quinn Hayes; April 14, 1956 (age 70) Bronxville, New York, U.S.
- Spouse: Julia Y. Jáuregui
- Education: Syracuse University (BS, JD, MBA)

William Quinn Hayes (born April 14, 1956) is a senior United States district judge of the United States District Court for the Southern District of California.

== Early life and education ==
Born in Bronxville, New York, Hayes received a Bachelor of Science degree from Syracuse University in 1978, a Juris Doctor from Syracuse University School of Law in 1983, and a Master of Business Administration from the Martin J. Whitman School of Management at Syracuse University in 1983.

== Career ==
Hayes was in private practice from 1983 to 1986. He was an adjunct faculty member at National College from 1984 to 1985. He was adjunct faculty at the University of Colorado Denver from 1985 to 1986. He was Chief of the Criminal Division for the Southern District of California's United States Attorney's Office from 1987 to 2003. He served as adjunct faculty at Thomas Jefferson School of Law from 1989 to 1996. He was an adjunct faculty member at the University of San Diego School of Law in 1998.

=== Federal judicial service ===
On May 1, 2003, Hayes was nominated by President George W. Bush to serve as a United States district judge of the United States District Court for the Southern District of California, to a new seat created by 116 Stat. 1758. He was confirmed by the United States Senate on October 2, 2003, and received his commission on October 6, 2003. He assumed senior status on August 1, 2021.

Legal offices
Preceded by Seat established by 116 Stat. 1758	Judge of the United States District Court for the Southern District of California; 2003–2021	Vacant
