= 2016 California Proposition 63 =

Proposition 63
- Firearms and Ammunition Sales

Results
Choice	Votes	%
Yes	8,663,159	63.08%
No	5,070,772	36.92%
Valid votes	13,733,931	94.00%
Invalid or blank votes	876,578	6.00%
Total votes	14,610,509	100.00%
Registered voters/turnout	19,411,771	75.27%
County results
Yes
80–90%
70–80%
60–70%
50–60%
No
80–90%
70–80%
60–70%
50–60%

The 2016 Proposition 63, titled Firearms and Ammunition Sales, is a California ballot proposition that passed on the November 8, 2016, ballot. It requires a background check and California Department of Justice authorization to purchase ammunition, prohibits possession of magazines with capacity of over ten rounds, levies fines for failing to report when guns are stolen or lost, establishes procedures for enforcing laws prohibiting firearm possession by specified persons, and requires California Department of Justice's participation in the federal National Instant Criminal Background Check System.

Supporters of the measure stated that it would "fix a major flaw" put in place by the passing of Proposition 47 in 2014 by stating that theft of a firearm is a felony, regardless of its monetary value.

A September 2016 poll from USC Dornsife / Los Angeles Times showed 64% percent of registered voters in favor of Proposition 63, 28% opposed, and 8% unknown. A November 2016 poll from Insights West showed 57% percent of likely voters in favor of Proposition 63, 35% opposed, and 8% undecided.

Proposition 63 passed, 63% to 37%.

== Ammunition purchase authorization requirement ==
Once passed, Proposition 63 requires a background check and California Department of Justice authorization for each ammunition purchase. A $25,000,000 loan was appropriated to cover start-up costs, with a $1 fee charged during most ammunition purchase (some purchases require a $19 fee) to repay this loan. On July 1, 2025, the cost of most authorizations increased from $1 per purchase to $5 per purchase.

== Federal court cases ==
=== Duncan v. Bonta ===
In March 2019, in the case Duncan v. Becerra (currently Duncan v. Bonta), the Federal District Court stayed enforcement of the new law as the state failed to show how this law didn't violate the Second Amendment or the property rights of owners of previously legal goods. On March 29, 2019, Judge Roger Benitez of the United States District Court for the Southern District of California ruled Proposition 63 unconstitutional, citing lawful defensive use of firearms across the state of California, specifically in the hands of women.

Benitez stated that various violent crimes were far more common than mass shootings, and people can use firearms to defend themselves from them providing the law allows it, giving several examples in the first few pages of the opinion. "As in the year 2017, in 2016 there were numerous robberies, rapes, and murders of individuals in California and no mass shootings. Nevertheless, a gubernatorial candidate was successful in sponsoring a statewide ballot measure (Proposition 63). Californians approved the proposition and added criminalization and dispossession elements to existing law prohibiting a citizen from acquiring and keeping a firearm magazine that is able to hold more than 10 rounds. The State now defends the prohibition on magazines, asserting that mass shootings are an urgent problem and that restricting the size of magazines a citizen may possess is part of the solution.

In August 2020, a three-judge panel of the U.S. Court of Appeals for the Ninth Circuit, in a 2–1 decision, upheld the district court's ruling. California Attorney General Xavier Becerra successfully petitioned for en banc rehearing by a wider 11-judge panel of the court. Duncan v. Bonta was heard en banc by the Ninth Circuit Court on June 22, 2021. The en banc Court overturned the lower appellate panel in its ruling, holding that California's regulation of firearms did not violate the 2nd Amendment. On June 30, 2022, the US Supreme Court vacated the 9th circuit court of appeals en banc decision and remanded it for reconsideration in light of the New York State Rifle and Pistol Association v. Bruen ruling. On September 23, 2022, the en banc panel vacated its opinion and remanded it back to Benitez.

On Friday, September 22, 2023, Benitez declared the California's ban on magazines that hold more than 10 rounds of ammunition to be unconstitutional for the second time, saying it violated the Second Amendment rights of firearm owners.

=== Rhode v. Bonta ===
The case Rhode v. Bonta, originally Rhode v. Becerra, is challenging Proposition 63's requirement for background checks to purchase ammunition as well as its prohibition against importation of ammunition into the state by residents, unless importation takes place through a licensed ammunition dealer. On April 22, 2020, Judge Roger Benitez of the United States District Court for the Southern District of California struck down the requirement and prohibition, stating "California's new ammunition background check law misfires and the Second Amendment rights of California citizens have been gravely injured." California's Attorney General Xavier Becerra filed for and was granted a stay of the injunction to appeal the decision to the United States Court of Appeals for the Ninth Circuit. The case will be reheard by Judge Benitez in the Southern California Federal District Court on July 17, 2023.

On January 30, 2024, Benitez struck down the requirement and prohibition for the second time.

In July 2025, the background check requirement was once again struck down by the 9th U.S. Circuit Court of Appeals.

== See also ==
- Gun laws in California
