= Roger Benitez =

American judge (born 1950)

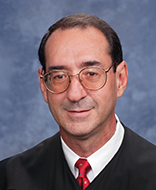

Senior Judge of the United States District Court for the Southern District of California
- In office December 31, 2017 – April 2, 2026

Judge of the United States District Court for the Southern District of California
- In office June 21, 2004 – December 31, 2017
- Appointed by: George W. Bush
- Preceded by: Seat established by 116 Stat. 1758
- Succeeded by: Linda Lopez

Magistrate Judge of the United States District Court for the Southern District of California
- In office 2001–2004

Judge of the California Superior Court
- In office 1997–2001

Personal details
- Born: Roger Thomas Benitez; December 30, 1950 (age 75) Havana, Cuba
- Spouse: Cathryn C. Carr
- Education: Imperial Valley College (AA); San Diego State University (BA); Thomas Jefferson School of Law (JD)

Roger Thomas Benitez (born December 30, 1950) is a former United States district judge of the United States District Court for the Southern District of California. He is known for his rulings striking down several California gun control laws.

== Early life and education ==
Born in Havana, Cuba, Benitez received an Associate of Arts degree from Imperial Valley College in 1971, a Bachelor of Arts degree from San Diego State University in 1974, and a Juris Doctor from the Western State University College of Law's San Diego campus (now the Thomas Jefferson School of Law) in 1978.

== Legal career ==
Benitez worked in private practice in Imperial County, California, from 1978 to 1997. He was a judge on the California Superior Court from 1997 to 2001, and an instructor for Imperial Valley College from 1998 to 1999.

== Federal judicial service ==
In 2001, Benitez was appointed by the United States District Court for the Southern District of California to serve as a United States magistrate judge. On May 1, 2003, he was nominated by President George W. Bush to a new seat on the Southern District of California created by 116 Stat. 1758. Benitez was confirmed by the United States Senate on June 17, 2004, by a 98–1 vote. The only vote in opposition came from Dick Durbin of Illinois. Benitez received his commission on June 21, 2004.

Benitez was confirmed despite overwhelming opposition from the American Bar Association's Standing Committee on the Federal Judiciary, which rates the qualifications of judicial nominees. A substantial majority of the committee rated Benitez "not qualified" and a minority rated him as "qualified." In 2004 testimony to the Senate Judiciary Committee, the ABA committee investigator reported that, "Interviewees repeatedly told me that Judge Benitez displays inappropriate judicial temperament with lawyers, litigants, and judicial colleagues; that all too frequently, while on the bench, Judge Benitez is arrogant, pompous, condescending, impatient, short-tempered, rude, insulting, bullying, unnecessarily mean, and altogether lacking in people skills." Benitez's nomination was nevertheless supported by both of California's senators and was the outcome of a bipartisan commission established by Senators Dianne Feinstein and Barbara Boxer.

Benitez assumed senior status on December 31, 2017, retiring on April 2, 2026. He served as a member of the Judicial Panel on Multidistrict Litigation from 2020 to 2026.

=== Disciplinary proceedings ===
On May 1, 2024, the Judicial Council of the Ninth Circuit publicly disciplined Benitez for judicial misconduct because he had unlawfully ordered a teenage girl to be shackled during her father's sentencing hearing: "First, the shackling of a spectator at a hearing who is not engaged in threatening or disorderly behavior exceeds the authority of a district judge. Second, creating a spectacle out of a minor child in the courtroom chills the desire of friends, family members, and members of the public to support loved ones at sentencing."

=== Notable opinions and rulings ===
Benitez is known for his opinions striking down several California gun control laws.

In 2019, Benitez granted summary judgment in a lawsuit (initially Duncan v. Becerra, later Duncan v. Bonta) in which plaintiffs challenged California's ban on so called "high-capacity" magazines. California Attorney General Xavier Becerra appealed the ruling to the Ninth Circuit. In 2020, a three-judge panel affirmed Benitez's grant of summary judgment in a 2–1 decision authored by Judge Kenneth Lee. However, the Ninth Circuit granted a petition for rehearing en banc review and vacated the panel decision. In November 2021, following en banc review, the Ninth Circuit reversed Benitez's decision. On June 30, 2022, the U.S. Supreme Court vacated the 9th circuit court of appeals en banc decision and remanded it for reconsideration in light of the New York State Rifle and Pistol Association v. Bruen ruling. On September 23, 2022, the en banc panel vacated its opinion and remanded it back to Benitez.

In Rhode v. Becerra, Benitez issued a preliminary injunction blocking enforcement of California's 2016 Proposition 63 law requiring background checks for ammunition sales, ruling in favor of the California Rifle & Pistol Association; he deemed the law "constitutionally defective." The Ninth Circuit stayed Benitez's ruling pending appeal. The Ninth Circuit eventually vacated his injunction and remanded it back to Benitez, only for him to strike down the ammunition restrictions the second time on January 30, 2024.

Benitez presided over the lawsuit Miller v. Bonta in 2021; the case challenged California's assault weapons ban. Following a trial, Benitez overturned the 32-year-old state law, ruling that "the state's definition of illegal military-style rifles unlawfully deprives law-abiding Californians of weapons commonly allowed in most other states"; he issued a permanent injunction, but stayed it for 30 days to give state Attorney General Rob Bonta time to appeal. Benitez opened his opinion by stating, "Like the Swiss Army Knife, the popular AR-15 rifle is a perfect combination of home defense weapon and homeland defense equipment. Good for both home and battle, the AR-15 is the kind of versatile gun that lies at the intersection of the kinds of firearms protected under District of Columbia v. Heller, 554 U.S. 570 (2008) and United States v. Miller, 307 U.S. 174 (1939)." In Heller, the Supreme Court decision that struck down a District of Columbia handgun ban, associate justice Antonin Scalia held that the Second Amendment gives citizens a right to own weapons "in common use", but explained its limitations by citing "the historical tradition of prohibiting the carrying of 'dangerous and unusual weapons'," such as "weapons that are most useful in military service – M-16 rifles and the like." Benitez held that the AR-15 passed the Heller test, stating that "The overwhelming majority of citizens who own and keep the popular AR-15 rifle and its many variants do so for lawful purposes, including self-defense at home." Benitez vocalized his disapproval of the measure in his ruling and expressed doubt that it had assisted in reducing the number of deaths inflicted by AR-15 variants, falsely claiming "More people have died from the Covid-19 vaccine than mass shootings in California." A three-judge panel of the Ninth Circuit Court of Appeals issued a stay of Benitez's ruling on June 21, 2021, leaving the ban in place as appeals were litigated.

On December 19, 2022, Benitez declared the fee-shifting provision of SB 1327 unconstitutional.

On February 28, 2023, a complaint was filed against Benitez over his handling of a hearing in which he ordered the defendant's 13-year-old daughter to be handcuffed.

On September 14, 2023, Benitez granted a preliminary injunction against school district policies that bar teachers from discussing students' gender identities with the latter's parents.

On September 22, 2023, Benitez overturned the State of California's "High Capacity Magazine" Ban in the Duncan v. Bonta lawsuit, citing the unconstitutionality of this law in his ruling. This marked the second time Benitez had issued a similar opinion, having previously presided over Duncan v. Becerra and ruling in favor of the plaintiff(s) in 2019. Unlike in his 2019 ruling, Benitez issued a 10-day stay on his second opinion in order to allow the State of California adequate time to appeal, which it promptly did later that same day. The appeal was assigned to the 9th Circuit Court of Appeals, which, in an unprecedented manner, called for an en-banc review of the State of California's appeal to Benitez's ruling in Duncan v. Bonta, opting out of the traditional three-judge panel review process of previous appeals. California Governor Gavin Newsom issued a post on the social media platform "X" following the ruling, in which, amongst other statements, he expressed his disagreement with Benitez's opinion and called him an "Extremist, Right-Wing Zealot with no regard for human life."

On October 19, 2023, Judge Roger Benitez delivered a decision on the remanded case in the United States District Court Southern District of California. In this decision he ruled the California assault weapons ban unconstitutional for the second time in that it violated the defendants' Second Amendment rights and granted a permanent injunction on the enforcement of the California statute. A 10-day stay on this ruling was also issued by Judge Benitez in anticipation of an appeal to the Ninth Circuit.

On February 23, 2024, Judge Roger Benitez, who had originally upheld California's ban on "billies", struck it down using the Bruen standard.

== See also ==
- List of Hispanic and Latino American jurists

Legal offices
Preceded by Seat established by 116 Stat. 1758	Judge of the United States District Court for the Southern District of California; 2004–2017	Succeeded by Linda Lopez
