= Kalashnikov USA =

American firearms manufacturer

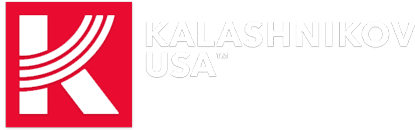
- Company type: Joint stock company
- Industry: Defense
- Predecessor: RWC Group LLC
- Founded: 2011
- Headquarters: Pompano Beach, Florida, United States
- Area served: Worldwide
- Key people: Manager & Sr Vice Pres Michael Tiraturian (Tiraturyan); Manager Peter Viskovatykh
- Products: Firearms; Weapons
- Parent: RWC Group LLC
- Website: kalashnikov-usa.com

RWC Group LLC, doing business as Kalashnikov USA (KUSA), is a privately owned American company that designs, manufactures and markets Kalashnikov-styled firearms for law enforcement, military and commercial markets. Russian-made Kalashnikov rifles and other weapons cannot be imported to the U.S. due to sanctions. KUSA was formed to create these weapons locally.

Kalashnikov USA, headquartered in Pompano Beach, Florida, is a brand name owned by RWC Group (Russian Weapons Company) LLC. Kalashnikov USA has no ownership connection to Kalashnikov Concern.

== History ==
A sanction on the Russian defence sector was started by the United States in 2014, in response to the Russian military intervention in Ukraine. On June 30, 2015, Thomas McCrossin, CEO of Kalashnikov USA, announced that Kalashnikov USA would begin selling United States manufactured weapons. In May 2017, Kalashnikov USA started selling its KS-12 semi-automatic shotgun. In 2018, the company was under scrutiny due to possible ties with Russia.

In 2024, the company filled for bankruptcy.

== Products ==
- Saiga clones (2015): US132 rifle modelled after the 7.62mm Izhmash IZ132 and US109 shotgun modelled after the 12 gauge Izhmash IZ109. The letter suffix indicates the type of furniture: "S" is synthetic polymer, "L" is laminated fiberglass, and "W" is wood. "Z" is a model with an M16/M4-style CAA CBSCB six-position stock, CAA UPG16 textured pistol-grip, and a CAA RS47-SET polymer forend with accessory rails.
- Saiga-12 clones (2017): KS-12 & KS-12T semi-automatic shotguns. The T ("Tactical") model has an M16/M4-style CAA SBS A-frame skeleton buttstock, CAA UPG16 textured pistol grip, and forend with accessory rails on the sides and bottom. Its polymer furniture comes in black, FDE ("Flat Dark Earth", or Tan), or ODG ("Olive Drab Green", or Greenish Brown).
- KR-9 carbines (2018): 9mm carbines based on the Vityaz-SN. Available in pistol (stockless with 9.25-inch barrel), short-barreled rifle (9.25-inch barrel), and rifle (16.25-inch barrel) sizes.
- KR103 (2020): A 7.62x39 rifle that is a clone of the AK103.
