= Arsenal Shipka =

Shipka
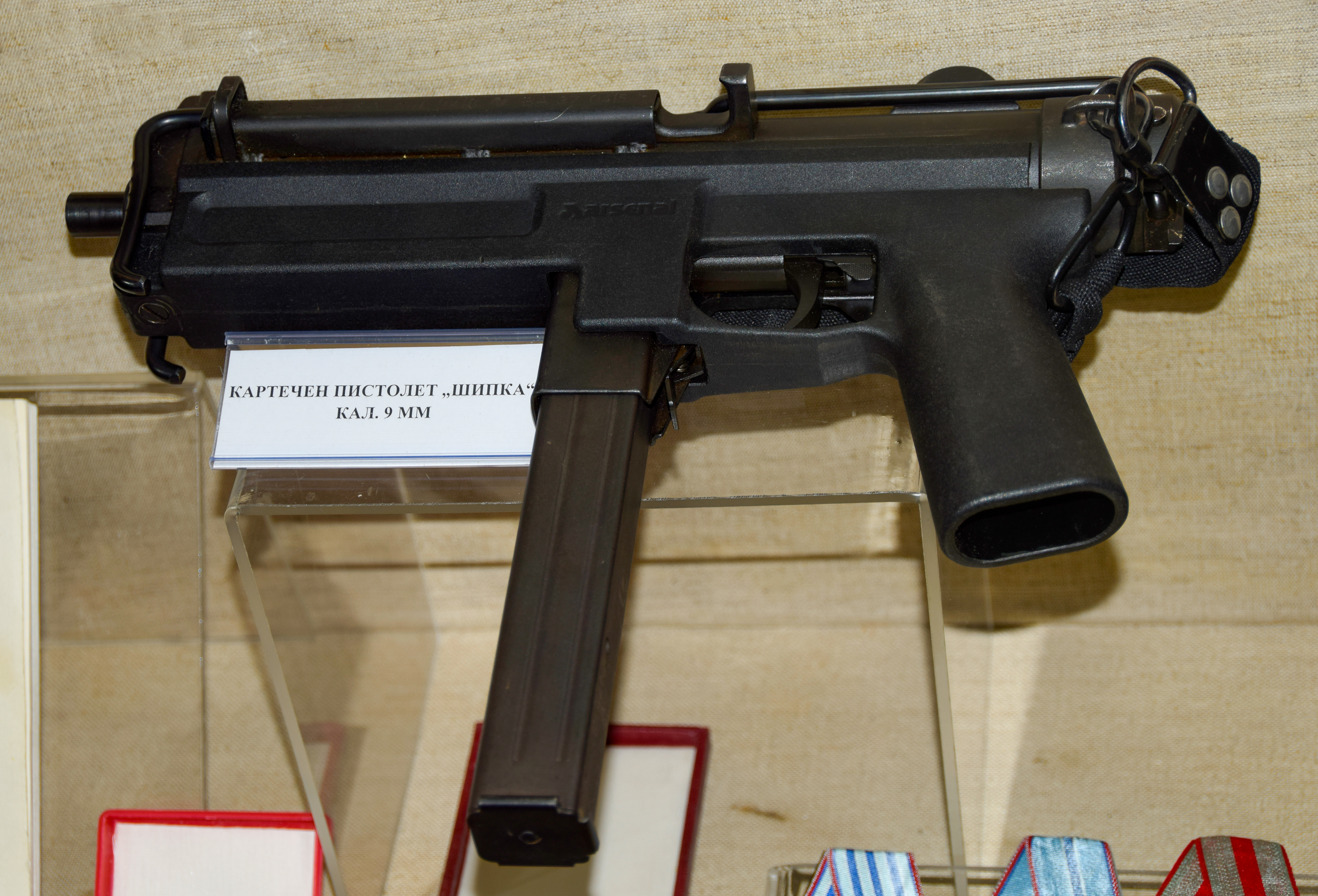
- Type: Submachine gun
- Place of origin: Bulgaria

Service history
- In service: 1999–present
- Used by: Bulgaria

Production history
- Produced: 1996

Specifications
- Mass: 2 to 2.2 kg without magazine
- Length: 338 mm (stock folded); 625 mm (stock extended)
- Barrel length: 150 mm
- Cartridge: 9×18mm Makarov; 9×19mm Parabellum
- Caliber: 9 mm
- Action: blowback
- Rate of fire: 600–650 rpm (9×18mm); 700 rpm (9×19mm)
- Muzzle velocity: 320 m/s (9×18mm); 360 m/s (9×19mm)
- Effective firing range: 150 m
- Feed system: Detachable box magazine: 32 rounds (9×18mm); 25 rounds (9×19mm)
- Sights: Iron sights

The Shipka is a 9mm Bulgarian submachine gun produced in 1996 by the Bulgarian arms company Arsenal. The name is a reference to the Shipka Pass, near Arsenal's Kazanlak headquarters, in the Balkans where Bulgarian volunteers and Russian troops defeated the Ottoman Empire during the Russo-Turkish War of 1877, thereby liberating Bulgaria. The Shipka was developed for the Bulgarian police and military.

== Design ==
The Shipka is a compact weapon originally intended for use by drivers, pilots, special operations forces, and other military personnel who might benefit from a close-quarter weapon that still had considerably greater range and fire rate than a typical sidearm. The prototype and pre-production versions of the Shipka were chambered in 9×25mm Mauser and used a 30-round box magazine.

Production versions were chambered in 9×18mm Makarov with a 32-round magazine. After Bulgaria's entry into NATO, a version chambered in 9×19mm Parabellum with a 25-round magazine was introduced. The design is a straightforward blowback operation firing from an open bolt. The lower receiver along with the pistol grip and trigger guard is made from polymer, while the upper receiver is made from steel. The simple buttstock is made from steel wire and folds to the left side of gun.

== See also ==
- Agram 2000
- Beretta M12
- Walther MP
- FEG KGP-9
- Interdynamic MP-9
