= Gun laws in New Jersey =

Location of New Jersey in the United States

Gun laws in New Jersey regulate the sale, possession, and use of firearms and ammunition in the U.S. state of New Jersey. New Jersey's firearms laws are among the most restrictive in the country.

== Summary table ==
Subject / law	Long guns	Handguns	Relevant statutes	Notes
State permit required to purchase?	Yes	Yes		A lifetime purchaser identification card (Firearm ID Cards issued after 2021 expire in 10 years and must be renewed) is required for purchase of rifles and shotguns, as well as for purchases of handgun ammunition. A permit to purchase a handgun, valid for 90 days is required for each handgun purchase. Only one handgun can be purchased within a 30-day period. According to judicial ruling, purchase permits/identification cards are supposed to be granted on a “shall-issue” basis.
Firearm registration?	No	Yes		The NJ State Police Firearms Investigation Unit (NJSP FIU) maintains a record of all handgun transfers, except for inherited firearms willed to the transferee, or firearms brought to the state by new residents moving to the state. Firearm registration is voluntary, but since handgun purchase permits are also a form of register, there is de facto mandatory handgun registration for handguns purchased in-state. Purchases by NJ residents must either be from a licensed dealer in NJ or a private individual who is a resident of NJ. In both dealer purchases and private sales, a copy of the purchase permit is sent to the NJSP FIU. A NICS background check at the point of sale is only required for purchases from dealers.
Owner license required?	No	No		Purchaser Identification Card required to purchase firearms in state. License is not required to own or possess firearms at exempt locations, only to purchase. Firearm must be compliant and/or brought into compliance with NJ law before entering NJ.
Permit required for concealed carry?	N/A	Yes	N.J. Admin. Code § 13:54	New Jersey calls its permit a "permit to carry a handgun" and is a "shall-issue" by judicial ruling for concealed firearm carry. The permit to carry must be approved by the municipality's police chief and the applicant must before their approval pass an NJ state police background check that includes mental health records search, driving record search, and criminal records searches. Disqualifies are extensive and can sometimes even include expunged or dismissed charges related to violence or vandalism, not contesting a TERPO gun confiscation, failing to renew an FPIC card on time, and numerous other disqualifiers.
Permit required for open carry?	No	Yes		Open carry is allowed only with a permit to carry a handgun and is generally not practiced except by security officers and others who carry firearms on duty. While it is technically legal to carry long guns with a valid Firearm Purchaser ID card, it is generally frowned upon by law enforcement, except when hunting. One can expect to be detained and questioned in most places if carrying in this manner. However, open carry of loaded long guns is not permitted. As of 2022 individuals that are not law enforcement and possess a permit to carry a handgun are no longer legally allowed to open carry a handgun.
State preemption of local restrictions?	Limited	Limited		There is limited state preemption for some firearm laws. N.J.S.A. 2C:58-3(f) states in part, "f. Granting of permit or identification card; fee; term; renewal; revocation...There shall be no conditions or requirements added to the form or content of the application, or required by the licensing authority for the issuance or renewal of a permit or identification card, other than those that are specifically set forth in this chapter." A few municipalities have a patchwork of additional safe storage laws stricter than NJ state law.
Assault weapon law?	Yes	Yes	N.J.S.A 2C:39-1	New Jersey prohibits the sale of certain semi-automatic rifles, shotguns, and handguns to ordinary citizens. Assault Firearms can be acquired through a seldom permit issued by a county superior judge.
Magazine capacity restriction?	Yes	Yes	N.J.S.A. 2C:39-1(y); N.J.S.A 2C:39-3(j)	New Jersey bans the purchase of magazines capable of holding more than ten rounds of ammunition to ordinary citizens that can fit in a semi automatic firearm.
NFA weapons restricted?	Yes	Yes	N.J.S.A 2C:39-3(a-c); N.J.S.A 2C:58-5	Possession of short barreled rifles, short barreled shotguns, destructive devices, and suppressors are prohibited to the average citizen. Law is silent on AOWs. Possession of a machine gun requires a state license, which is granted on a may issue basis by a county superior court judge. Machine gun licenses are extremely difficult to obtain.
Background checks required for private sales?	Yes	Yes		Private firearm sales require a background check conducted through a federally licensed gun dealer except for temporary transfers, transfers between law enforcement officers, or transfers between immediate family.
Red flag law?	Yes	Yes		A judge may issue a gun violence restraining order authorizing the police to confiscate a person's firearms if the judge determines that the person poses a significant risk of personal injury to himself or others. New Jersey law allows anyone to file for a Temporary Extreme Risk Protection Order on any person.

== Constitutional provisions ==
The Constitution of New Jersey has no provision explicitly guaranteeing the right of citizens to keep and bear arms.

== Limits and restrictions ==
Hollow-point ammunition is available for unrestricted purchase from most retailers wherever firearms are sold, and may be transported by purchasers without special licensing. However, hollow-point bullets may not be carried outside of a place of target practice, dwelling, premises or land possessed by a person, even if one has a valid permit to carry a handgun, except when being transported directly to and from these places. LEOSA (HR 218) qualified and retired or separated LEOs carrying anywhere in the US are exempt from state laws and may legally carry hollow-point ammunition or any ammunition that is not prohibited under the Gun Control Act of 1968 or the National Firearm Act. Additionally the NJ Superior Court in State v Brian Aitken has ruled that there is no exception for moving between residences with hollow-point bullets.

Some localities have adopted Second Amendment sanctuary resolutions.

== Permits to purchase and own ==
In New Jersey, anyone seeking to purchase (but not to possess or use at exempt locations) firearms is required to obtain a lifetime Firearm Purchaser Identification card, commonly referred to as FPIC, for the purchase of rifles and shotguns. To purchase a handgun, a separate permit is needed from the Chief of Police of their municipality, or the Superintendent of State Police if the municipality does not have a local police department. A permit is required for each handgun to be purchased and expires after 90 days but may be extended for an additional 90 days at the discretion of the Chief of Police or Superintendent of State Police. These, like the initial Firearms Purchaser Identification Card (FPIC), are provided to applicants on a may-issue basis. They require in-depth application questioning, multiple references and background checks via the State Bureau of Identification and New Jersey State Police; however, authorities do not have discretion and must issue permits to applicants who satisfy the criteria described in the statutes. Reasons for denial include being convicted of a crime (equivalent to a felony) or disorderly persons offense (equivalent to a misdemeanor) in the case of domestic violence. As of August 2013 anyone on the terror watchlist is also disqualified.

NJ law states that Firearms Purchaser Identification approval and/or handgun purchase permit(s) must be issued within 30 days. However, this is not always adhered to with some applicants waiting months to receive their permits. Applicants are able to appeal the denial of permits. The Firearm Purchaser ID card is also required to purchase handgun ammunition at dealers in the state. "Handgun ammunition" is interpreted as any caliber that can be used in a handgun, therefore some calibers that are typically used in rifles and shotguns require one to show a FPIC to purchase.

Private firearm transfers require a background check conducted through a federally licensed gun dealer. The dealer is required to keep a record of the sale. There are limited exceptions, including for transfers between members of an immediate family and for law enforcement officers.

=== Forms required by municipalities ===
N.J.S.A 2C:58-3(f):

There shall be no conditions or requirements added to the form or content of the application, or required by the licensing authority for the issuance of a permit or identification card, other than those that are specifically set forth in this chapter.

Only two forms are required to obtain a FPIC or permit to purchase a handgun: the "Application for Firearms Purchaser Identification Card and/or Handgun Purchase Permit", STS-33, and "Consent For Mental Health Records Search", SP-66. Additionally, the Chief of Police for the Municipality or the Superintendent of State Police may require an applicant to be fingerprinted or complete a "Request for Criminal History Record Information", form SBI 212A. Fingerprinting is usually done at private facilities such as Morpho (Safran) and the SBI 212A form can be submitted online or on paper. The method of submission is determined by the local police department. Many police departments and the NJSP are moving toward online submission and phasing out the paper SBI 212A.

Some municipalities have required additional forms, photographs and other requirements such as notarization. These forms are not required for approval per NJSA 2C:58-3a. This has been affirmed by the Appellate Court in two cases, one against the City of Paterson by resident Jeremy Perez, and another against Jersey City by resident Michael McGovern where the court ruled against the cities in violation.

=== Fees ===
Each FPIC application fee is $50 and each permit to purchase a handgun is $25. Fingerprinting is charged a fee by the private facility contracted by the state, approximately $50 to $60. The SBI 212A "Request for Criminal History Record Information" application fee is $18 if submitted on paper or $20 if submitted online. Each police department has its own policy with regard to which method they choose for background checks. Some may require fingerprinting for each application, but most only require it for the initial FPIC.

New Jersey limits handgun purchases to one per 30-day period. Upon completing a New Jersey State police form, an FID card holder may be granted permission to purchase more than one handgun a month by declaring good reason. Reasons may include: recreational shooting; the purposes of collectors; when it is required for certain employment; and when obtaining firearms as the beneficiary of a will. The State application required for this increase, Form SP-015, specifically requires the make, model and serial number of each firearm to be transferred prior to the exemption, keeping the spirit of the purchasing limit safe from circumvention.

=== Self-made firearms ===
New Jersey outlawed the manufacture and sale of self-made firearms/homemade firearms in 2018 and the transfer and possession in 2019 along with 3D printing guns, including possessing or sharing computer code that can be used to program the printing of such guns. The law is being challenged in court.

== Permits to carry and transport ==
=== Permit to carry a handgun ===
New Jersey “shall-issue” a Permit to Carry a Handgun for both open and concealed carry to both residents and non-residents in accordance with New York State Rifle & Pistol Association, Inc. v. Bruen. One must submit an application to the chief law enforcement officer of one's municipality, or the Superintendent of State Police in areas where there is no local police department. Armored car employees are required to apply to the Superintendent of State Police. Non-residents may apply to the Superintendent of State Police. By judicial ruling, New Jersey is a "shall-issue" permit system, in which authorities must issue a permit if the applicant meets the minimum requirements. Additionally, training and range qualification is required. After a background check and review by the law enforcement agency, permit applications are forwarded to the Superior Court where they are approved or denied.

New Jersey formerly had a “justifiable need” standard by which an applicant was required to show a special, specific need, such as a substantiated threat, to be issued a permit. Supreme Court case New York State Rifle & Pistol Association, Inc. v. Bruen voided this requirement.

Qualified retired law enforcement officers may carry under LEOSA, which allows retired and current law enforcement officers who qualify and meet certain criteria to carry concealed firearms. There is no requirement for qualified retired or separated officers to apply for the state permit when carrying under LEOSA, 18 U.S. Code § 926C, since the federal law trumps state law through the Supremacy Clause. As of the end of 2013, there were 1,212 active Handgun Carry Permits in New Jersey, out of a population of nearly 9 million residents.

New Jersey AB 4769 places a proactive requirement on the side of business owners that wish to allow carry of a firearm on their premises, effectively making the default such that all private property would be illegal for New Jersey gun owners to carry firearms on. This is also being challenged in court on the basis that, "Even business owners who are happy to serve permit holders carrying concealed handguns may be reluctant to advertise that fact, lest they alienate other customers with strong anti-gun views." This rule however, has been ruled unconstitutional by the Supreme Court in Wolford v. Lopez.

Currently, New Jersey defines the following areas as "sensitive areas." Including, government administration buildings, courthouses & judicial premises, correctional & detention facilities, state-contracted halfway houses, polling areas & election facilities, within 100 feet of permitted public gatherings, an educational institution, child care facilities & day cares, nursery schools & pre-schools, zoos, summer camps, or government owned parks, beaches, and recreational areas. Youth sport events, public libraries, publicly owned museums, shelters (homeless, youth, childcare, children's, domestic violence, or any shelter licensed or controlled by the Juvenile Justice Commission or Department of Children and Families), community residences & group homes (for persons with developmental disabilities, head injuries, terminal illness or licensed by the Department of Human Services or Department of Health), bars & restaurants that serve alcohol, marijuana dispensary or consumption area, entertainment facilities & venues, casinos & related facilities, energy & utility facilities, airports & transportation hubs, health care facility, addiction & mental health treatment facilities, film & TV production locations, and any other places prohibited by local, state, or federal law.

=== Carry to exempted locations ===
There are a few exempted locations where one may carry and possess firearms. These locations are one's home, place of business, premises or land possessed, or to a gunsmith for purposes of repair. Members of rifle or pistol clubs that submit their names to the state police annually are allowed to possess and transport their firearms to "a place of target practice." Those who are not members of a rifle or pistol club can carry their firearms to "an authorized target range." One may also carry firearms to the woods or fields or waters of the state for purposes of hunting or fishing. One must have a valid hunting or fishing license and the firearms must be appropriate for hunting or fishing to be covered under this exemption.

=== Interstate transportation of unloaded firearms ===
Interstate transportation is covered under the Safe Passage provision of the Firearm Owners Protection Act (FOPA), 18 USC § 926A, which states:

Notwithstanding any other provision of any law or any rule or regulation of a State or any political subdivision thereof, any person who is not otherwise prohibited by this chapter from transporting, shipping, or receiving a firearm shall be entitled to transport a firearm for any lawful purpose from any place where he may lawfully possess and carry such firearm to any other place where he may lawfully possess and carry such firearm if, during such transportation the firearm is unloaded, and neither the firearm nor any ammunition being transported is readily accessible or is directly accessible from the passenger compartment of such transporting vehicle: Provided, That in the case of a vehicle without a compartment separate from the driver's compartment the firearm or ammunition shall be contained in a locked container other than the glove compartment or console.

However, the Third Circuit Court of Appeals in Association of New Jersey Rifle and Pistol Clubs v. Port Authority of New York and New Jersey has found that this provision only applies to transporting a firearm in a vehicle, and that carrying a firearm in a locked container in checked luggage in an airport terminal to declare it to the airline constitutes unlawful possession and is not protected under the law. This decision was a direct result of a 2005 incident where Gregg C. Revell, a Utah Resident with a valid Utah Concealed Firearm Permit was traveling through Newark Airport en route to Allentown, Pennsylvania. Because of a missed flight, he was given his luggage, which included a properly checked firearm, and was forced to spend the night in a hotel in New Jersey. When he returned to the airport the following day to check his handgun for the last portion of the trip, he was arrested for illegal possession of a firearm. Revell lost his lawsuit after The U.S. Court of Appeals for the Third Circuit held in Gregg C. Revell v. Port Authority of New York and New Jersey, [222] held that "Section 926A does not apply to Revell because his firearm and ammunition were readily accessible to him during his stay in New Jersey." This opinion will apply to NJ airports. If a traveler misses a flight or for any other reason their flight is interrupted and the airline tries to return their luggage that includes a checked firearm, the traveler cannot take possession of the firearm if they are taking a later flight. The Association of New Jersey Rifle and Pistol Clubs (ANJRPC) later also sued the Port Authority of New York and New Jersey, which resulted in a similar decision.

== Assault firearms ==
New Jersey initially banned the sale of firearms classed as assault firearms in 1990. Assault firearms acquired before May 1, 1990, and registered with the state are legal to possess. New Jersey later defined certain firearms with certain cosmetic features to also be assault firearms. Members of the military, law enforcement agencies, some government employees, and certain security guards may possess them for duty use. FFLs are also allowed to possess "assault firearms" to sale or maintain them for military, law enforcement, and out of state customers. Persons may also apply to the Superior Court of the county they reside in for a permit to possess "assault firearms" and machine guns. In practice however, the license has rarely if ever been granted to individual private citizens.

=== Assault firearm criteria ===
Under New Jersey Revised Code 2C:39-1, a firearm is classified as an "assault firearm" if it meets the following criteria:

Assault firearms banned by name:

- Algimec AGM1 type
- Any shotgun with a revolving cylinder such as the "Street Sweeper" or "Striker 12"
- Armalite AR-180 type
- Australian Automatic Arms SAR
- Avtomat Kalashnikov type semi-automatic firearms
- Beretta AR-70 and BM59 semi-automatic firearms
- Bushmaster Assault Rifle
- Calico M-900 Assault carbine and M-900
- CETME G3
- Chartered Industries of Singapore SR-88 type
- Colt AR-15 and CAR-15 series
- Daewoo K-1, K-2, Max 1 and Max 2, AR 100 types
- Demro TAC-1 carbine type
- Encom MP-9 and MP-45 carbine types
- FAMAS MAS223 types
- FN-FAL, FN-LAR, or FN-FNC type semi-automatic firearms
- Franchi SPAS 12 and LAW 12 shotguns
- G3SA type
- Galil type Heckler and Koch HK91, HK93, HK94, MP5, PSG-1
- Intratec TEC 9 and 22 semi-automatic firearms
- M1 carbine type
- M14S type
- MAC 10, MAC 11, MAC 11-9mm carbine type firearms
- PJK M-68 carbine type
- Plainfield Machine Company Carbine
- Ruger K-Mini-14/5F and Mini-14/5RF
- SIG AMT, SIG 550SP, SIG 551SP, SIG PE-57 types
- SKS with detachable magazine type
- Spectre Auto carbine type
- Springfield Armory BM59 and SAR-48 type
- Sterling MK-6, MK-7 and SAR types
- Steyr A.U.G. semi-automatic firearms
- USAS 12 semi-automatic type shotgun
- Uzi type semi-automatic firearms
- Valmet M62, M71S, M76, or M78 type semi-automatic firearms
- Weaver Arm Nighthawk

New Jersey law also banned firearms that are "substantially identical" to any name banned firearm. On August 19th, 1996, Attorney General of New Jersey, Peter Verniero released a memo to law enforcement officials that clarified that firearms with any of the following features are firearms that are "substantially identical" to name-banned firearms and are also classed as an "Assault Weapon":

Semi-automatic rifles able to accept detachable magazines and at least two of the following:
- Folding or telescoping stock
- A pistol grip that protrudes conspicuously beneath the action of the weapon
- Bayonet mount
- Flash suppressor, or threaded barrel designed to accommodate a flash suppressor
- Grenade launcher mount

Semi-automatic pistols with detachable magazines and at least two of the following:
- Magazine that attaches outside the pistol grip
- Threaded barrel to attach barrel extender, flash suppressor, forward handgrip, or silencer
- Barrel shroud safety feature that prevents burns to the operator (does not include the slide of a pistol)
- Unloaded weight of 50 oz (1.4kg) or more
- A semi-automatic version of a fully automatic firearm.

Semi-automatic shotguns with at least one of the following:
- Folding or telescoping stock
- Pistol grip that protrudes conspicuously beneath the action of the weapon
- A fixed magazine capacity in excess of six rounds;

A semiautomatic rifle with a fixed magazine capacity exceeding 10 rounds.

“Assault firearm” shall not include a semi-automatic rifle which has an attached tubular device and which is capable of operating only with .22 caliber rimfire ammunition.

== High-capacity magazines ==
New Jersey first banned the sale of high-capaicity magazines – those holding more than 15 rounds of ammunition – in 1990. The limit was then lowered to 10 rounds of ammunition in 2018 via Assembly Bill 2761. Tubular magazines that can only hold .22 caliber ammunition are exempt. Law enforcement officers may purchase, carry, and possess magazines holding up to 17 rounds of ammunition. Law enforcement officers may also possess and carry magazines of any capacity for agency-issued firearms. Retired law enforcement officers that were authorized to carry a firearm can purchase, carry, and possess magazines holding up to 15 rounds of ammunition. Members of the US Armed Forces and New Jersey National Guard are exempt when on duty. Licensed FFLs may possess large-capacity magazines to sale or deposition to another FFL, the military and law enforcement agencies.

== NFA items ==
Only members of the US Armed Forces, NJ National Guard, and law enforcement agencies may possess short-barreled rifles (SBR), short-barreled shotguns (SBS), destructive devices (DD), and silencers in New Jersey. SBRs and SBSs are classified as "sawed-off shotguns" in New Jersey. There is a limited exemption allowing persons named in a special deer control permit issued by the New Jersey Division of Fish and Wildlife to utilize a silencer for alternative deer control. Similarly, antique cannons are exempt from the general ban on destructive devices in New Jersey. Machine Guns can only be possessed by persons listed in NJS 2C:39-6(a) or NJS 2C:39-6(b), which includes certain law enforcement officers, security guards, licensed firearms dealers, military servicemen, and certain civilian government employees employed by the US Government on military installations. Machine guns can also be possessed with a seldom issued permit from a county superior court where the holder resides in. Any-Other-Weapons are not effected by the restrictions on other NFA items and can be legally owned in NJ.

== Bump stocks ==
In his final day in office in January 2018, Governor of New Jersey Chris Christie signed legislation making the gun accessory known as a bump stock illegal. Devices known as "trigger clanks" are also illegal in New Jersey.

== New Jersey Childproof Handgun Law ==
The New Jersey Childproof Handgun Law is a 2002 state law that requires that all dealers offer at least one smart gun for sale in their store.

== Red flag law ==
Under New Jersey's red flag law, a judge may issue a gun violence restraining order authorizing the police to confiscate a person's firearms if the judge determines that the person poses a significant risk of personal injury to himself or others. A hearing must be held within ten days. At the hearing the person's firearms may be forcibly confiscated for an indefinite period of time.

== See also ==
- Law of New Jersey
