= Tech Nine =

Tech Nine may refer to:

- TEC-9, a semi-automatic handgun
- Tech N9ne, an American rapper
- Todd Terry, an American DJ who sometimes performed under the handle "Tech Nine"
