= Star Model Z62 =

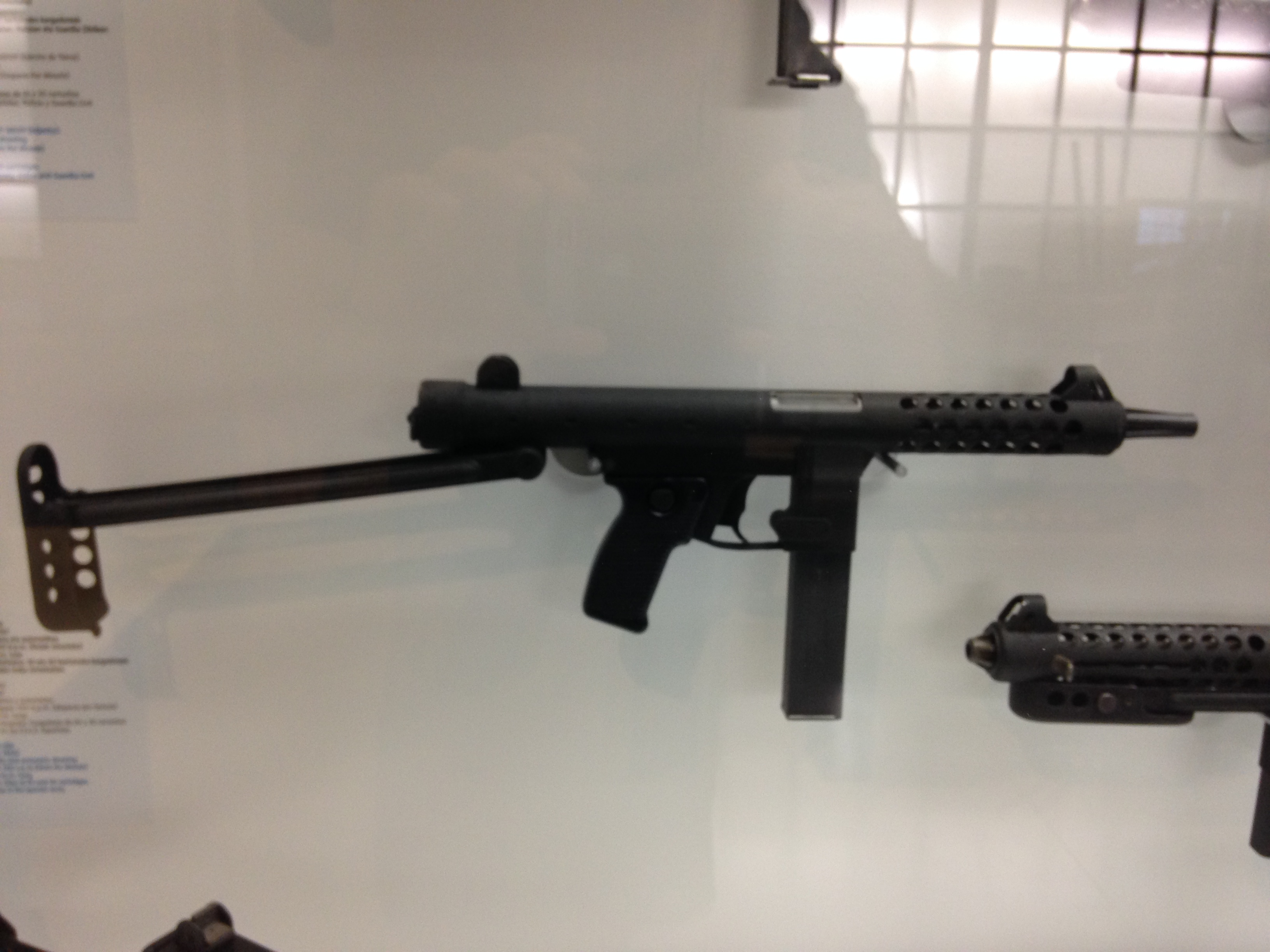
- Type: Submachine gun
- Place of origin: Spain

Service history
- In service: 1962–present
- Used by: See Users
- Wars: Argentine Dirty War; Salvadoran Civil War

Production history
- Manufacturer: Star Bonifacio Echeverria
- Variants: Z62; Z70

Specifications
- Mass: 2.87kg
- Length: 480mm
- Barrel length: 201mm
- Cartridge: 9×23mm Largo (Spanish service); 9×19mm Parabellum (export)
- Caliber: 9mm
- Action: Blowback
- Rate of fire: 550rpm
- Effective firing range: 200m
- Feed system: 30 round box magazine
- Sights: Iron

The Star Model Z62 is a submachine gun of Spanish origin which was developed to replace the Star Model Z45 in 1962.

== Overview ==
The Star Model Z62 is a blowback operated firearm which fires from an open bolt. Earlier variants came with a double crescent trigger for single and full auto.

== Variants ==
=== Z62 ===
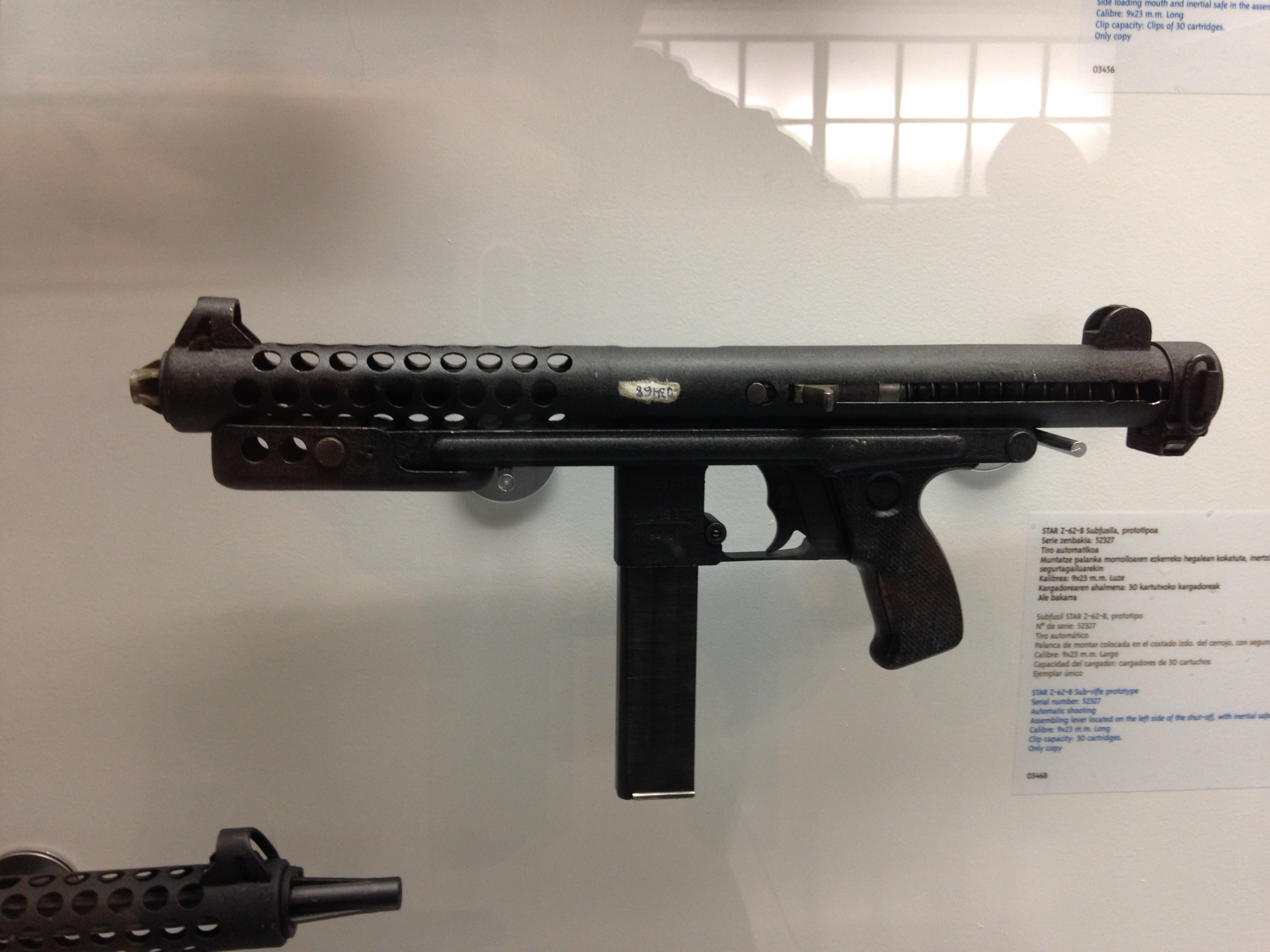
Star Z62B

Uses a double crescent trigger for semi/full auto. Cocking handle on the left side of the receiver. Z62C uses cocking handle in front of receiver in the handguard.

=== Z70 ===
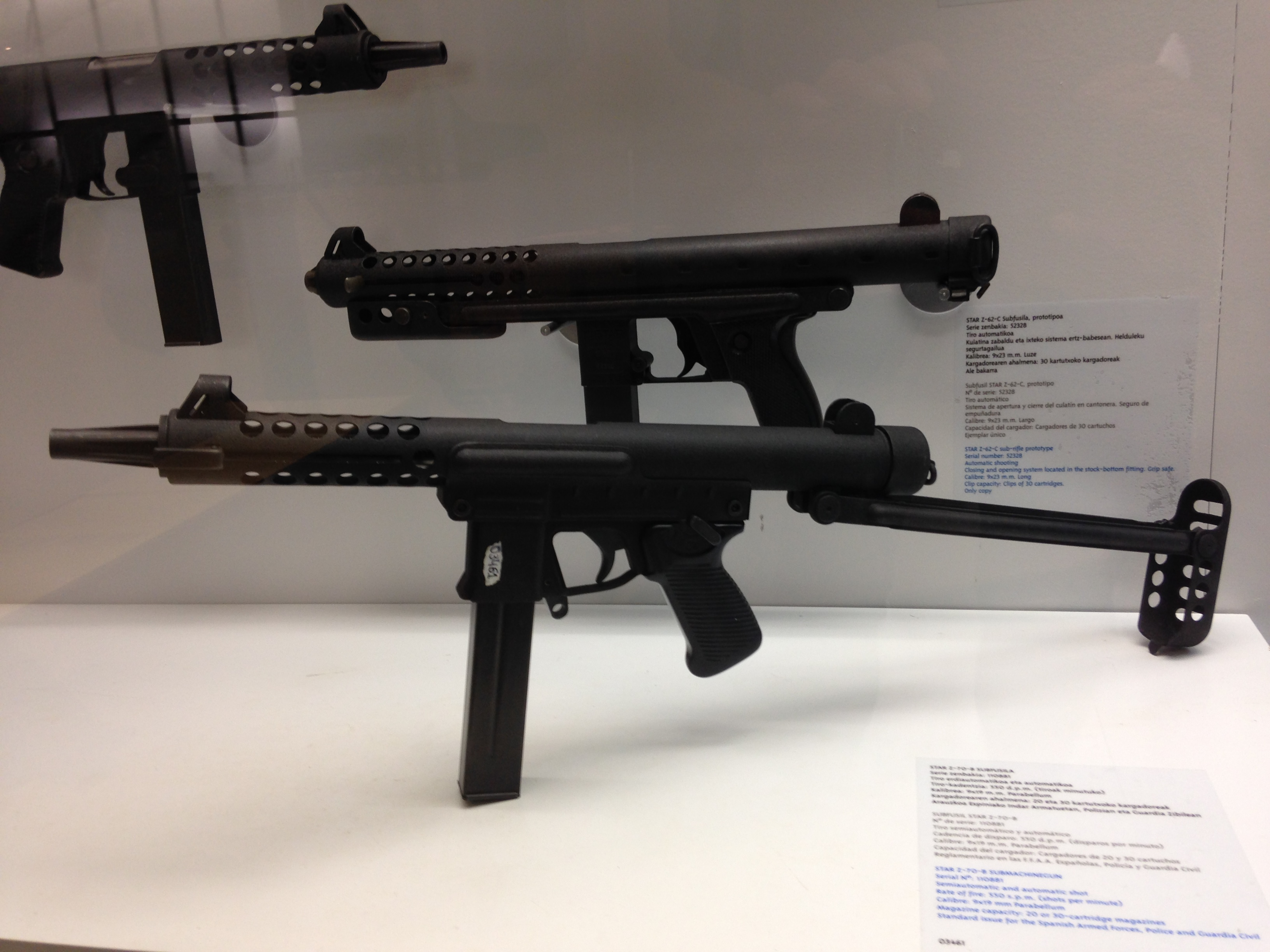
Star Z-70-B

Uses a single trigger with select switch on fire control group. Cocking handle in front of the receiver in the handguard.

== Users ==
- Argentina
- Bolivia: issued to police forces
- Spain

== See also ==
- Weapons of the Salvadoran Civil War
- Beretta M12
- Agram 2000
- Interdynamic MP-9
