= TEC-9 =

Semi-automatic pistol

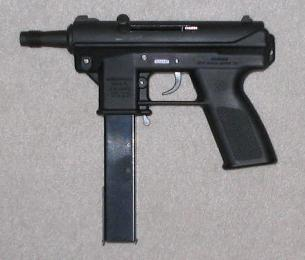
- Interdynamic AB KG-99 Mini
- Type: Semi-automatic pistol
- Place of origin: United States

Production history
- Designer: George Kellgren
- Manufacturer: Intratec
- Produced: 1984–2001
- No. built: 257,434
- Variants: KG-99; TEC DC-9; TEC DC-9M; AB-10; TEC-9M (Mini, 76 mm barrel, no barrel jacket, 22-round magazine); TEC-9S (stainless steel)

Specifications
- Mass: 1.23–1.4 kg depending on model
- Length: 241–317 mm depending on model
- Barrel length: 76–127 mm depending on model
- Cartridge: 9×19mm Parabellum
- Caliber: 9mm
- Action: Blowback-operated, semi-automatic
- Muzzle velocity: 1,181 ft/s (360 m/s)
- Effective firing range: 50 m (160 ft)
- Feed system: 10-, 20-, 32-, 36- and 50-round box magazine, 72-round drum magazine
- Sights: Iron sight

The Intratec TEC-9, TEC-DC9, KG-99, and AB-10 are a line of blowback-operated semi-automatic pistols. They were developed by Intratec, an American subsidiary of the Swedish firearms manufacturer Interdynamic AB. Introduced in 1984, the TEC-9 is made of inexpensive molded polymers and a mixture of stamped and milled steel parts. The simple design of the gun made it easy to repair and modify. It was a commercial success, with over 250,000 being sold.

Similar to the AK-47's symbolism with Third World and leftist revolutionaries and the Thompson submachine gun with Prohibition-era gangsters, the TEC-9 is notorious in American pop culture for its association with criminal gangs, drive-by shootings and mass shootings in the 1990s, being used during massacres like the 101 California Street shooting, the 1996 Jackson firehouse shooting, and the Columbine High School massacre.

== History ==
Interdynamic AB, a Swedish firearms manufacturer based in Stockholm, designed the Interdynamic MP-9, intended as an inexpensive 9mm submachine gun based on the Carl Gustav M/45 for military applications. The firearm was initially intended for adoption by the South African apartheid government, though it was rejected and shipped to various other nations. Ultimately, Interdynamic did not find a government buyer.

As a result, the weapon was taken by lead designer George Kellgren to the United States domestic market as an open-bolt semi-automatic pistol known as the KG-9, redesigned to eliminate its collapsible stock and vertical foregrip features per the National Firearms Act of 1934 and marketed under the subsidiary Interdynamic USA brand. Interdynamic USA was operated by George Kellgren, Carlos Garcia and Mercedes Garcia.

Still, the design was deemed too easy to convert to an automatic weapon. Due to this, the Bureau of Alcohol, Tobacco, Firearms and Explosives (ATF) forced Interdynamic USA to redesign the firearm into a closed-bolt system, which was harder to convert to an automatic weapon. This variant was called the KG-99, and was popularized when it made frequent appearances on the popular television show Miami Vice, where it was legally converted to full auto by Title II manufacturers.

The KG-9 and KG-99 have an open-end upper receiver tube where the bolt, recoil springs, and buffer plate are held in place by the plastic/polymer lower receiver frame. This design only allows for 115 grains (7.5 g) 9mm ammunition, and if a heavier grain ammunition or hot loads are used, the plastic lower receiver will fail or crack, rendering the firearm unusable.

Interdynamic USA eventually became Intratec when George Kellgren left the company and Carlos Garcia renamed it Intratec, this also led to the KG-99 having its name changed to TEC-9.

Later versions of the TEC-9 and AB-10 had a threaded upper receiver tube at the rear and a screw-on end cap to contain the bolt, recoil spring, and buffer plate even if removed from the lower receiver, solving the problem of lower receiver failure when using hot ammo.

=== Reputation and legislation ===
Following the 1989 Cleveland School massacre, the TEC-9 was placed on California's list of banned weapons. To circumvent this, Intratec rebranded a variant of the TEC-9 as TEC-DC9 from 1990 to 1994 (with DC standing for "Designed for California"). The most noticeable external difference between the TEC-9 and the later TEC-DC9 is that rings to hold the sling were moved from the side of the gun with the cocking handle to a removable stamped metal clip in the back of the gun. In 1993, the weapon was the subject of further controversy following its use in the 101 California Street shootings That same year, California amended the 1989 Roberti–Roos Assault Weapons Control Act (AWCA), effective January 2000, to ban handguns having features such as barrel shrouds. During the 1990s the TEC-9 also developed a reputation for its use by American street gangs and organized crime syndicates, who were attracted to the large capacity 32-round magazines and low cost of the firearm.

The TEC-9 was produced from 1985 until 1994, when the model and TEC-DC9 variants were banned nationally in the United States, among the 19 firearms banned by name in the now-expired 1994 Federal Assault Weapons Ban (AWB). This ban forced Intratec to cease their manufacture, and forced them to introduce a newer model. The following year Intratec introduced the AB-10 ("AB" standing for "After Ban"), a TEC-9 Mini without a threaded muzzle/barrel shroud and sold with a smaller 10-round magazine instead of 20- or 32-round magazines. However, the AB-10 still accepted the larger capacity magazines of the pre-ban TEC-9 models which were often acquired by users in place of the standard magazine. In 1999, the TEC-DC9 Mini was notoriously used by Dylan Klebold, one of the perpetrators of the Columbine High School massacre, ending with him using it to take his own life.

In 1994, the TEC-9 was used by murder suspect Bennie Lee Lawson in a shooting at Henry Daly Building in Washington, D.C., killing two FBI agents, one police officer and wounding another FBI agent and a civilian before taking his own life.

The TEC-9 was also used in the 1990 drive-by shooting at Nashville, Tennessee, West End Synagogue by Grand Wizard of the Ku Klux Klan Leonard William Armstrong.

In 2001, the Supreme Court of California ruled that Intratec was not liable for the 1993 101 California Street attacks, and that same year Intratec was dissolved and production of the AB-10 model ceased. Although still found on the used firearms market and legal on the federal level since 2004, the TEC-9 and similar variants are banned, often by name, in several US states including California, New York, New Jersey, and Maryland.

=== Influence and clones ===
Despite its poor reputation, the TEC-9 has been subject to clones and inspiring both contemporary and subsequent pistol and submachine gun designs. A notable case is the Kimel AP-9, a semi-automatic pistol and pistol-caliber carbine line made by A.A. Arms. The AP-9 is very similar in terms of outward appearance, albeit with several design differences such as more prominent sights and thumb safety. It is generally considered to be a TEC-9 clone.

The bolt design of Croatian Agram 2000 submachine gun has been based on that of the TEC-9.

In 2015, B&T introduced the P26, a semi-automatic pistol and submachine gun line made for both civilian and military market. The design has been noted for its similarities to the TEC-9 and its predecessor, the Interdynamic MP-9, such as the tubular design, direct blowback action and polymer lower. The design would later be sold to Beretta, who would slightly modify the design and release the line as the PMX, aiming to replace the aging PM12 submachine gun. Both the P26 and PMX have been regarded as evolution of the TEC-9 design.

Quantities of an illegally-made 9mm machine pistol were seized in Europe in 2017. Despite being improvised weapons (and not developed by Intratec) they were nonetheless marked as "Intratec TEC-9", believed to possibly have been done as a means to improve the street value of the weapon.

== See also ==
- Intratec TEC-22 -.22 long rifle front-magazine semi-automatic pistol manufactured by Intratec
- Carlo (submachine gun) - Improvised submachine gun also inspired by the Carl Gustav M/45
- Claridge Hi-Tec/Goncz Pistol - Tubular design semi-automatic pistols with a telescoping bolt produced in early 1990s
- Star Model Z62
