= Beretta M12 =

Beretta Model 12
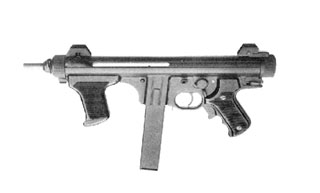
- Type: Submachine gun
- Place of origin: Italy

Service history
- In service: 1961–present
- Used by: See Users
- Wars: Vietnam War; The Troubles; Basque conflict; Operation Marajoara; Afghanistan wars; Lebanese Civil War; Iran–Iraq War; Libyan Civil War

Production history
- Designer: Domenico Salza, Beretta
- Designed: 1950–1959
- Manufacturer: Beretta, Taurus, Defence Industries Corporation, MAS, PT Pindad
- Produced: 1959–present
- Variants: See Variants

Specifications
- Mass: Metal stock: 3.0 kg (6.61 lb) (M12); 3.2 kg (7.1 lb) (M12S); 3.480 kg (7.67 lb) (M12S2); Wood stock: 3.4 kg (7.5 lb) (M12); 3.6 kg (7.9 lb) (M12S)
- Length: Fixed stock: 660 mm (26.0 in); Folding stock: 645 mm (25.4 in) stock extended; 418 mm (16.5 in) stock folded
- Barrel length: 200 mm (7.9 in)
- Height: 180 mm (7.1 in)
- Cartridge: 9×19mm Parabellum
- Action: Blowback
- Rate of fire: 550 rounds/min
- Muzzle velocity: 380 m/s (1,247 ft/s)
- Effective firing range: 100 to 200 m sight adjustments
- Feed system: 20-, 32-, or 40-round detachable box magazine
- Sights: Two-position flip rear aperture, shrouded front post 285 mm (11.2 in) sight radius

The Beretta M12 (Model 12) is a 9×19mm Parabellum caliber submachine gun designed by Beretta. Production started in 1959, the first users were the Italian Carabinieri, Italian State Police and the Guardia di Finanza, though in limited numbers; it was only widely issued beginning in 1978, replacing the old Beretta MAB. In 1962 the Italian Army bought a limited number of Franchi LF-57 submachine guns, judged better than the M12 but never issued to the troops, and only in 1992 the M12S2 variant was introduced, in very limited numbers. The Italian Air Force bought instead many M12S and M12S2 for the airport security units. However, the weapon had a higher initial success in the Arab countries and South America.

The weapon was first seen during the Tet Offensive in 1968 when the U.S. Marines guarding the U.S. embassy in Saigon repelled the assault by the Viet Cong using the Beretta M12. It is also used by various South American, African and Asian countries, and made under licence in Brazil by Taurus, in Belgium by FN Herstal and in Indonesia by PT Pindad.

The M12 is being replaced by the Beretta PMX, which is deliberately built to not require much retraining to use.

== Development ==
In 1959, Beretta weapons designer Domenico Salza revisited an old project, the Armaguerra Cremona OG44 submachine gun, in order to make a new submachine gun to replace the old MAB model 1938. The Model 12 was the final production model, and was followed ten years later by the M12S with differences in the safety and other mechanics.

== Design details ==
The Model 12 weighs 3.48 kilograms empty (about 3.820 kg loaded) and is 660 millimeters in length with stock extended (418 mm when retracted). Its short length is achieved by use of a barrel recessed into the bolt head, known as a telescoping bolt. This reduces length without reducing barrel length or bolt weight. It fires from an open bolt and has a cyclic rate of fire of 550 rounds per minute.

The barrel and rifling are chromium-plated to prevent fouling. The bolt housing has grooves to allow bolt movement, even in extremely adverse conditions such as exposure to mud, dust, or sand. The exterior surfaces of the firearm are finished with epoxy resin coating for protection against corrosion and damage.

The weapon has a selective-fire option allowing a choice of single shot or fully automatic fire.

The weapon has three safeties: a manual safety which blocks the trigger; an automatic safety on the rear grip which immobilizes the trigger and blocks the bolt in a closed position; and a safety on the cocking handle locking the bolt in case it does not retract sufficiently.

The weapon is provided with a front sight (adjustable for elevation and windage) and a rear sight with a two-position flip aperture (up to 100 m and up to 200 m).

The gun is equipped with a side folding stock, but is also seen rarely with a fixed stock.

20-, 32-, and 40-round box magazines were available for the original Model 12, which was chambered for the 9mm Parabellum cartridge.

== Variants ==
The first variant was introduced, in limited number, at the end of the '60s for the Italian Navy special forces and is easily recognizable from the longer barrel, about one inch, and the presence of a birdcage-type flash suppressor. It has been replaced by the Heckler & Koch MP5.

The Model 12 was redesigned as the Beretta Model 12S in 1978. The Model 12S uses a 32-round box magazine, and is chambered for the 9×19mm NATO cartridge.

A novel feature is the grip safety, which locks the trigger and the bolt in the closed position, thus safeguarding against accidental firing if the grip is not held firmly or if the gun is dropped. The safety and fire-selector switch, which in the original Model 12 were two separate push-pin button (with the fire-selector being a button that activated single-fire or burst fire whether it was pushed on the right side or the left side) have been re-engineered in a modern lever-type selector with three positions (S for "Sicura" or Safety, 1 for Single-fire, R for "Raffica" or Burst fire). The fixed firing pin on the face of the bolt can strike the primer only when the cartridge is chambered fully, and this also avoids accidental firing, according to its designers.

The PM12S was also designed with easy field-stripping and reassembly in mind, which has been simplified and can be accomplished without tools. It can be equipped with a suppressor, but this requires a slight modification of the barrel by a competent gunsmith.

Minus the suppressor and other optional features, the Beretta PM12S is made up of 84 discrete components.

The current version of the Beretta Model 12, is called the PM12-S2. In the mid-1980s the Italian Carabinieri, after a misfire accident, asked for a modification, in the form of a further safety device, which allowed both to keep the bolt of the weapon in half-cocked position and acted as an interceptor preventing accidental fire should the bolt or the firing pin suddenly disengage. This modification was implemented as a standard factory feature, and the denomination of the submachine gun changed to PM12-S2; this is the only Model 12 variant currently manufactured by Beretta.

== Users ==
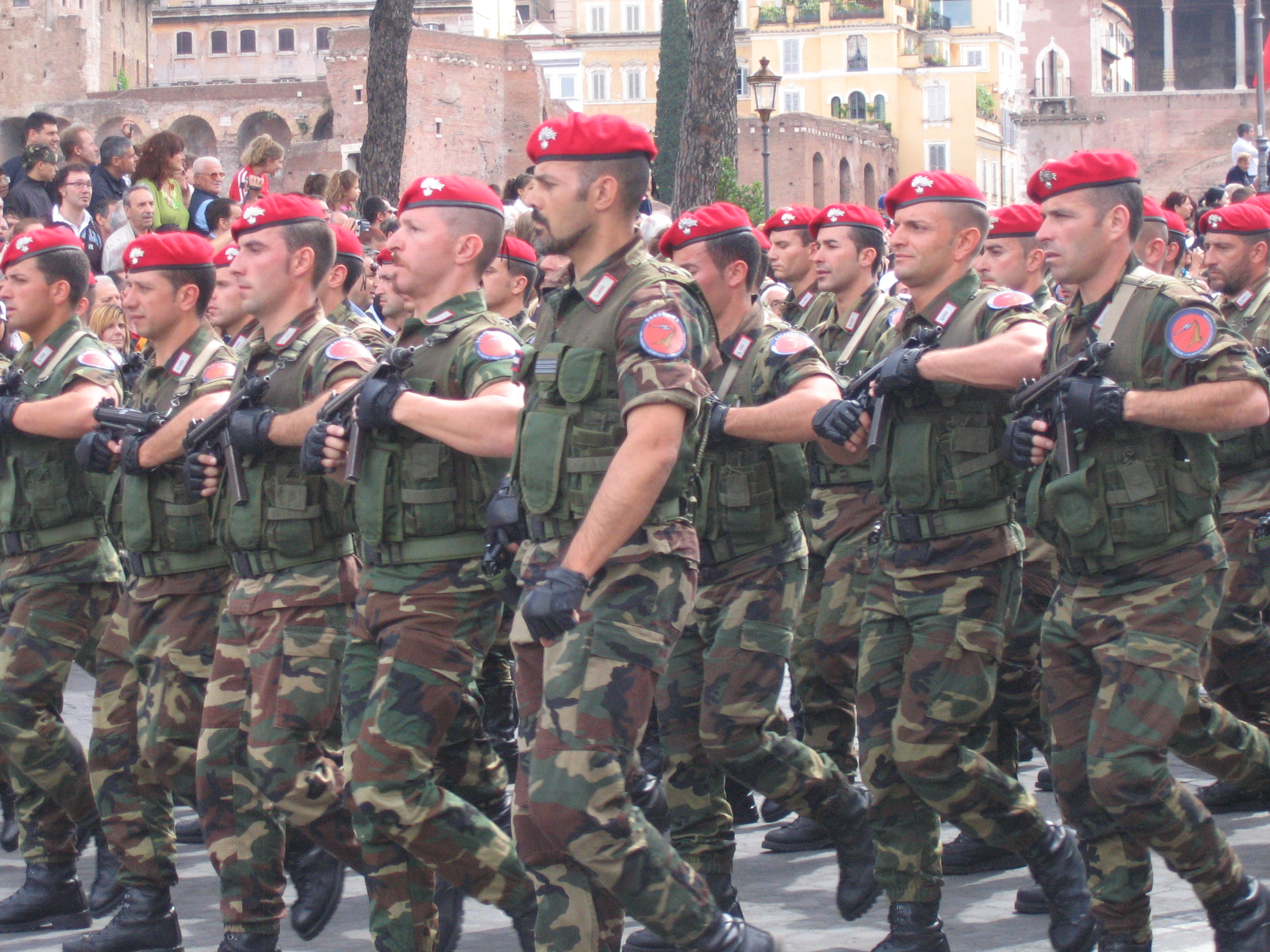
Carabinieri officers of the Squadrone Eliportato Carabinieri (Carabinieri Helicopter Squadron) armed with M12s.

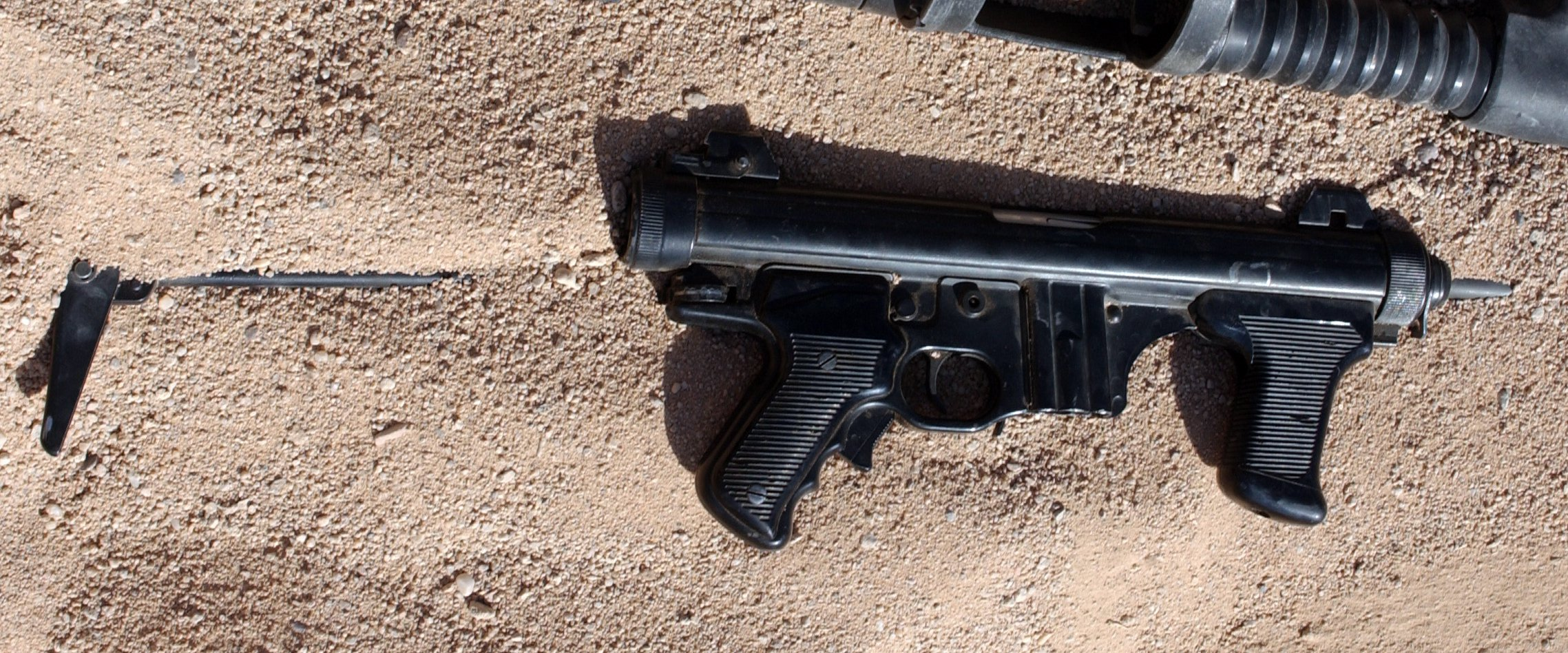
Beretta M12

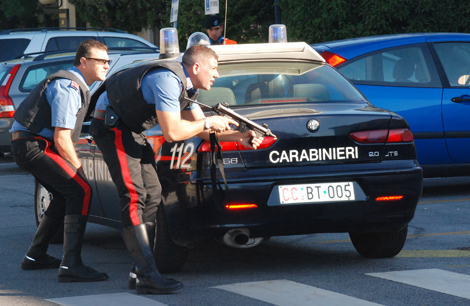
Carabinieri armed with a M12, during an exercise.

- Algeria
- Bahrain
- Belgium Made under license by F.N. Herstal (out of service)
- Brazil: Made under license by Taurus as the MT12. Standard submachine gun of the Brazilian Army where it is designated M972.
- Chile
- Costa Rica
- Egypt
- France: Used by police officers.
- Gabon
- Guatemala
- Guyana
- Indonesia: Manufactured under license. Known models made by Pindad consist of the PM1 and the PM1A1. Used by the Indonesian Forest Rangers.
- Iran
- Italy: It is used by all armed forces and police forces: the GIS and NOCS special groups, the Carabinieri, Italian Navy, Italian Air Force, Polizia di Stato, Guardia di Finanza, Polizia Penitenziaria and Corpo Forestale dello Stato.
- Libya
- Malta: Armed Forces of Malta.
- Nigeria
- Portugal: Used by Polícia de Segurança Pública.
- Saudi Arabia
- Sudan
- Tunisia
- United States
  - Central Intelligence Agency and some SWAT teams
  - Baltimore City Police Department
- Vatican City
- Venezuela

=== Non state users ===
- National Resistance Army
- PAIGC
- Provisional IRA

== See also ==
- Arsenal Shipka
- Agram 2000
- Walther MP
- Interdynamic MP-9
- Spectre M4
- Star Model Z62
- List of Italian submachine guns
