= Murder of Carol Bowne =

2015 murder in New Jersey, United States

Carol M. Bowne
- Born: Carol M. Ehly; June 6, 1975; Stratford, New Jersey
- Died: June 3, 2015 (aged 39); Berlin Township, New Jersey, United States
- Cause of death: Stabbed to death
- Occupation: Hairdresser
- Spouse: Roy T Bowne Jr (died 2012)
Murder of Carol Bowne
- Perpetrator: Michael Eitel

Carol M. Bowne, née Ehly was a 39-year-old woman who was stabbed to death by her obsessed ex-boyfriend Michael Eitel on June 3, 2015, at her home in Berlin, New Jersey. Eitel was a convicted felon having served five years in prison. Prior to her murder, Bowne filed a restraining order against Eitel as well as submitted an application to obtain a firearm permit. Firearm permits in New Jersey are legislated to take a maximum of 30 days to be issued. At the time of her murder, 42 days after her permit request, Bowne had not been issued a firearm permit. As a result of Carol Bowne's murder, the gun laws in New Jersey were altered to make it easier for domestic violence victims to own and carry firearms.

== Background ==
Carol Bowne was a hairdresser in the township of Berlin, New Jersey. Bowne had lived in Berlin her whole life and was said to be "caring and friendly". Those who knew her were also worried about her safety. Bowne's husband died in a 2012 motorcycle accident. Eitel had been his friend, and moved in with Bowne to provide support after her husband had died.

Bowne filed a restraining order against Eitel that March after abuses such as hitting her, smashing her face into her trucks dashboard, breaking her nose, splitting her face and strangling her. Eitel violated the restraining order on many accounts by stalking, damaging her car, house and cyber bullying Bowne. Bowne requested the Berlin Township Police to walk her into her house when she had finished work from 9 pm to 10 pm but was turned down due to a "lack of manpower". Only on one account was an arrest warrant issued. According to state law, police cannot be held liable for failure to protect citizens, with or without a civil protection order.

Michael Eitel was a 45-year-old convicted felon, previously convicted of violating a restraining order during a September 2006 kidnapping of his ex-girlfriend at gunpoint with her one-year-old daughter. Eitel was charged with aggravated assault, carjacking and a weapons offense and was sentenced to five years imprisonment.

== Death ==
Bowne was fatally stabbed outside of her home late at night on Wednesday June 3, 2015. Images of Eitel committing the murder were captured on the building security system.

== Aftermath ==
On Saturday June 6, 2015, Carol Bowne's fortieth birthday, Eitel was found dead. He had killed himself in the garage of a previous ex-girlfriend's home on Holly Drive, the same street he had grown up on, and two miles from Carol Bowne's home.

The process of legally obtaining a gun varies in legislation across states in America. At the time of Bowne's murder, New Jersey's firearm permit application process involved a 30-day processing period. The murder of Carol Bowne resulted in a change to New Jerseys Gun Control Laws by Governor Chris Christie following her death in 2015. The legislation stated that "those living under a direct or material threat" could apply to receive a firearm permit in 14 days, not 30. This change was subsequently reverted in 2019 by Governor Phil Murphy in an attempt to make New Jerseys gun control policies the "strongest" in America.

Bowne's attack was not the first of its kind in New Jersey. In 2009, Letizia "Lisa" Zindell was strangled by her ex-boyfriend the night he was released from jail, violating his restraining order; Bowne's mother wrote an opinion piece published in the Courier-Post, relating Zindell's incident to Bowne's.
