= MP9 =

MP9 or MP-9 can refer to:

- Brügger & Thomet MP9, a machine pistol
- Interdynamic MP-9, a submachine gun
- Ruger MP9, a submachine gun
- MP9, a zone during the Eocene epoch
- Mario Party 9, a 2012 Wii video game and the second and final game for the console
