= Kimel AP-9 =

- Type: Semi-automatic pistol
- Place of origin: United States

Production history
- Manufacturer: A. A. Arms
- Unit cost: $279 MSRP
- Produced: 1988–1994
- Variants: AP-9 Mini; AP-9 Target; P-95; AR-9 Carbine

Specifications
- Mass: 3 lbs. 7 oz. (1,559 g)
- Barrel length: Standard model: 5 in (127 mm) Mini: 3 in (76 mm); Target: 12 in (304 mm) Carbine: 16.5 in (419 mm)
- Cartridge: 9×19 mm Parabellum
- Action: Blowback action

The Kimel AP-9 is a semiautomatic pistol that was manufactured by A. A. Arms and distributed by Kimel Industries, Inc. of Indian Trail, North Carolina. A. A. Arms began manufacturing the AP-9 in 1988 until 1994.

== Design ==
The standard AP-9 has a 5-inch barrel. The AP-9 Target began with a 12-inch barrel (Target AP-9), but this was later reduced to 11 inches (AP-9/11 Target); they both have a separate fore-end and a fluted barrel. These firearms were banned by most states after the passage of the Federal Assault Weapons Ban.

After the Assault Weapons Ban of 1994, a ten-round magazine was introduced. Original magazines included 10-round and 20-round capacities.

=== Accessories ===
The AP-9 had original accessories of a hard plastic case, a nylon case with extra magazine pouches, a forward handle, a flash suppressor, and recoil compensator, as well as a barrel extension.

== See also ==
- Claridge Hi-Tec/Goncz Pistol
