= Beretta PMX =

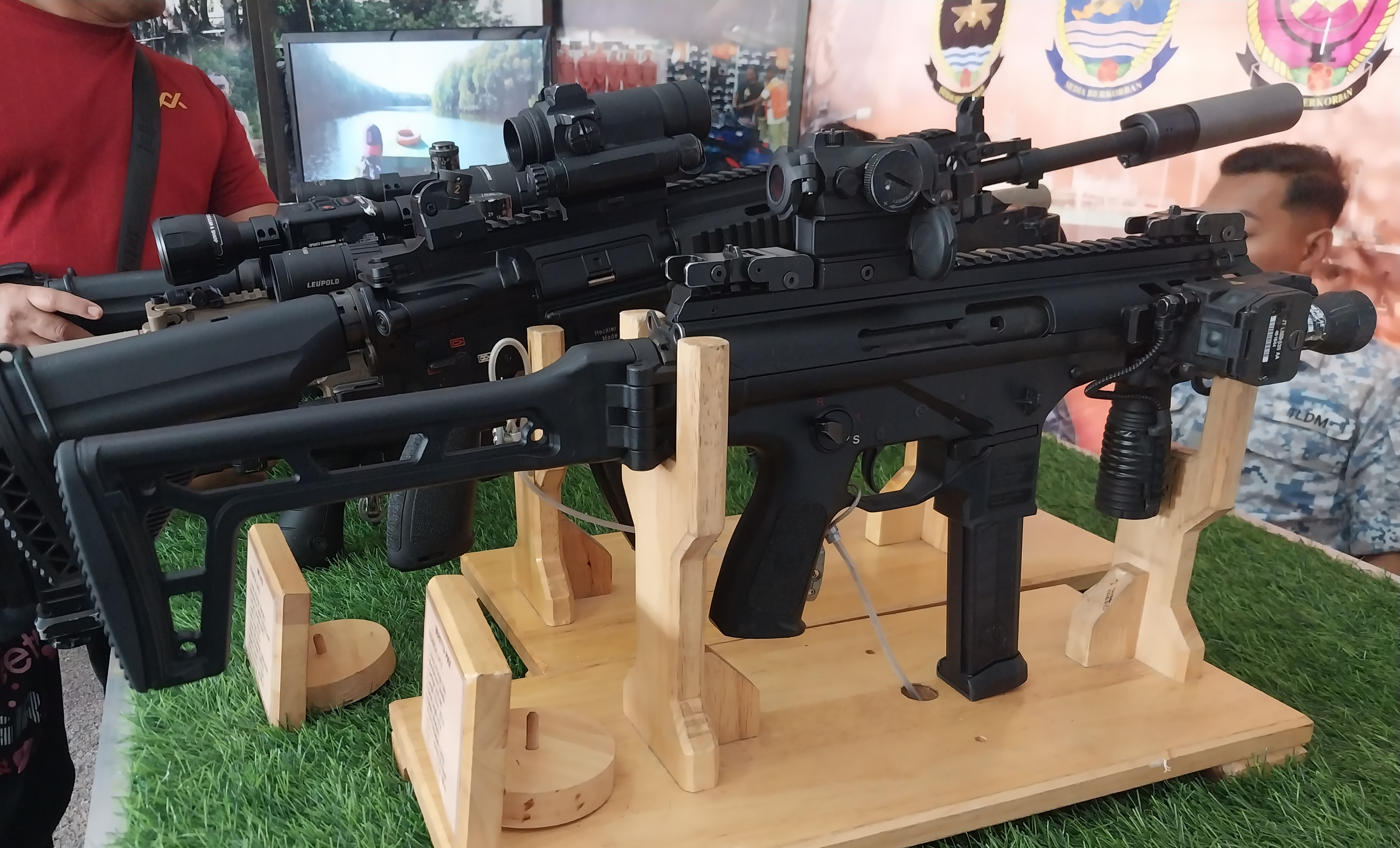
- Royal Malaysian Navy Beretta PMX on display at MAF 2025 anniversary day
- Type: Submachine gun Semi-automatic pistol / Pistol-caliber carbine (PMX-S)
- Place of origin: Italy

Service history
- In service: 2018–present
- Used by: See Users

Production history
- Designer: Beretta
- Designed: Early 2010s
- Manufacturer: Beretta
- No. built: 8,500+

Specifications
- Mass: Unloaded: 2.4 kg (5.29 lb)
- Length: Extended stock: 640 mm (25.2 in); Folded stock: 418 mm (16.5 in)
- Barrel length: 175 mm (6.9 in)
- Cartridge: 9×19mm Parabellum
- Action: Blowback
- Rate of fire: 900 rounds/min
- Feed system: 30-round detachable box magazine
- Sights: Removable rear sight adjustable in windage and front sight adjustable in elevation

The Beretta PMX is a 9×19mm Parabellum caliber submachine gun, designed and manufactured by the Italian company Beretta.

== Development ==
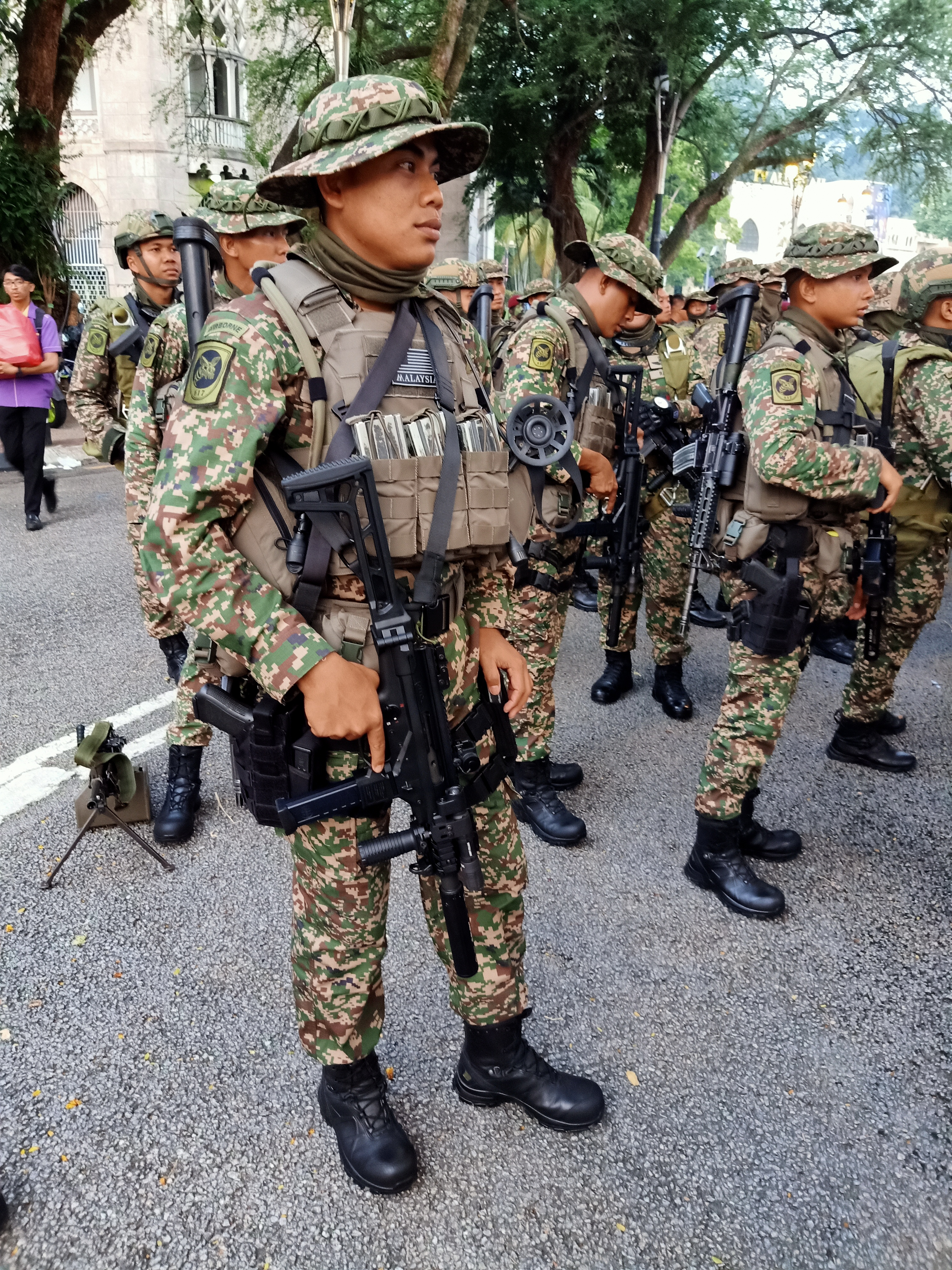
Member of the Malaysian 10th Parachute Brigade with Beretta PMX

Around 2015–2016, there were many rumours about the release of a new submachine gun model that was then presented by Beretta during the "Milipol" exhibition in Paris in 2017.

The PMX was presented in 2017 and is intended to replace the Beretta M12 as an ordinance weapon of some law enforcement in Italy. The semi-automatic only version made for the civilian market is sold as PMX-S.

== Design details ==
The Beretta PMX is a closed bolt and blowback operated submachine gun made by engineering plastic and aluminum. It shares design features with the Intratec TEC-9 and the Beretta M12, which was supplied to many police forces and armed forces around the world.

Its total empty weight is 2.4 kg and it is 640 mm long with extended folding stock (418 mm with folded stock). It is fed with a 30-round magazine, chambered in 9×19mm Parabellum NATO caliber, shooting a 900 rounds/min rate of fire.

It has an ambidextrous three-position manual safety with selective fire (semi-automatic and full auto), adjustable folding sights and "MIL-STD 1913" picatinny rails that allow to use various accessories as aiming devices of any type.

== Users ==
- Indonesia: Used by Special Force.
- Italy: Since 2018, Italy's Carabinieri has ordered, after experimentation in some operational departments, more than 5,000 PMXs with the future intention of modernizing the entire individual weapons arsenal.
- Malaysia: As of February 2023, at least 47 Beretta PMXs have been ordered for the Elite Forces of Malaysia.
- Saudi Arabia: In March 2022, it was confirmed that the Saudi government awarded Beretta a contract for 3,500 PMXs to arm the Saudi Royal Guard Regiment.
- Singapore: Used by the Naval Diving Unit since 2025 (replacing the Heckler & Koch MP5).

== See also ==
- Beretta M12
