= Intratec TEC-22 =

Semi-automatic handgun manufactured by Intratec

TEC-22 / Scorpion
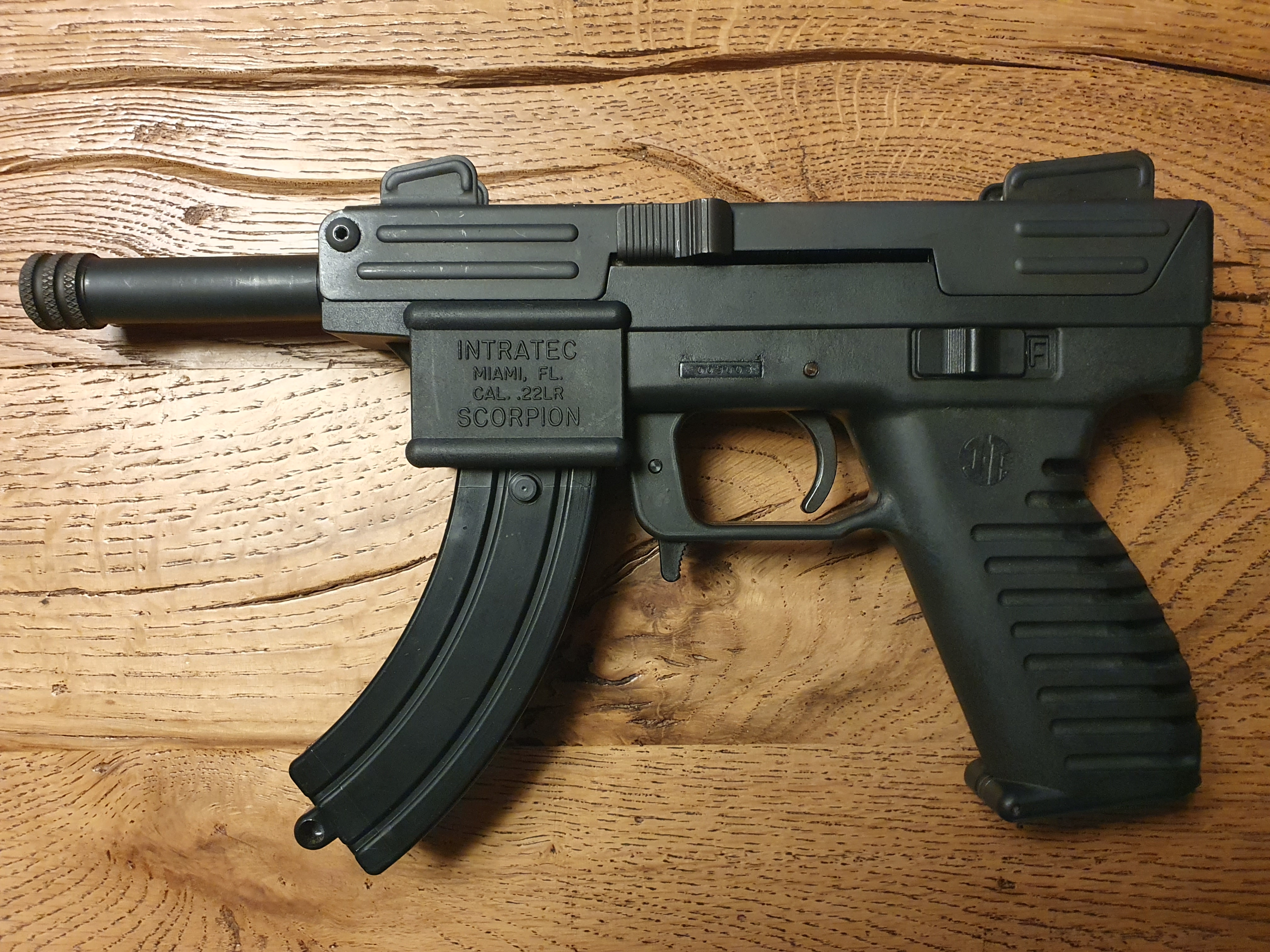
- Intratec TEC-22 with threaded barrel & original magazine
- Type: Semi-automatic pistol
- Place of origin: United States

Production history
- Designer: George Kellgren
- Manufacturer: Intratec
- Produced: Circa 1988 to 1994 (TEC-22), 1994-2000 (Sport-22)
- Variants: TEC-22TK; TEC-25 (.25ACP); Sport-22

Specifications
- Mass: 0.822 kg
- Length: 284 mm
- Barrel length: 102 mm
- Width: 41 mm
- Height: 157 mm
- Cartridge: .22 Long Rifle
- Action: Blowback-operated, semi-automatic
- Muzzle velocity: 1000 ft/s (305 m/s)
- Feed system: 10/22 magazine (Proprietary magazines also exist)
- Sights: Notch and post

The Intratec TEC-22 is a semi-automatic handgun chambered in .22 Long Rifle manufactured by Intratec. It was also marketed as the Scorpion and Sport-22. The TEC-22 operates using a straight blow-back action.

The TEC-22 is constructed largely from molded plastic and stamped metal parts. The materials used, along with its extremely simple design, allowed the gun to be made and marketed inexpensively. The TEC-22 is designed to use both standard and drum magazines made for the popular Ruger 10/22 rifle.

== Design ==
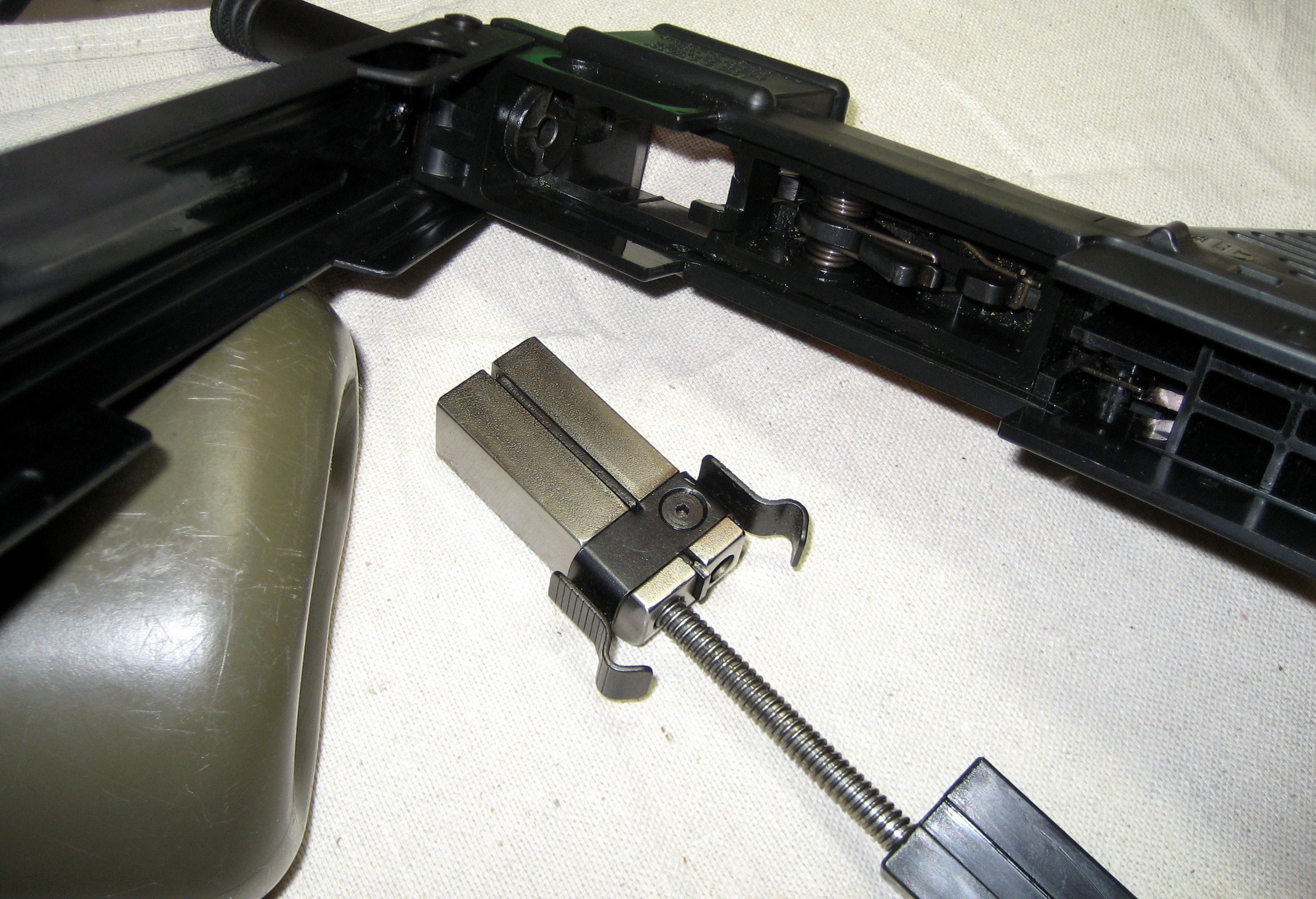
TEC-22 internal parts

The single-piece frame/receiver is molded from ABS plastic and largely unmachined with the exception of the bolt guides which the bottom of the bolt rides on. A stamped steel receiver cover rests over the top of the bolt, sandwiching it in place. The receiver cover hinges at the front of the frame and latches onto the rear of the bolt assembly. The bolt assembly consists of a cast steel bolt that rides on a spring and follower; a thin firing pin channel runs down the center of the bolt, allowing the stamped firing pin to be struck by the hammer and impact the cartridge at the front of the bolt. Although the TEC-22 is compatible with 10/22 magazines, Intratec manufactured and sold their own brand of 15- and 30-round double stack magazines for the pistol.

A small, ambidextrous switch on the frame actuates a trigger block safety. A hinged door at the bottom of the grip provides a small storage compartment.

Over its production run, the TEC-22 suffered from various quality control issues. For example, some were recalled because they were firing automatic bursts.

== Variants ==
=== Original ===
The original TEC-22 variant featured a threaded barrel and a 30-round magazine. The barrel threading is 1/2–20 and allows a barrel extension or suppressor to be attached. A small, knurled nut threads onto the barrel to protect the threading.

=== TEC-22TK ===
A small number of pistols were made with the Tec-Kote rust-resistant finish in 1988. Other than the finish, there is no difference between models.

=== TEC-25 ===
In 1986, a small number of the TEC-25 variant were made. The pistol was similar to the standard TEC-22, but was chambered in .25 ACP. The TEC-25 is completely unrelated to the Intratec Protec-25 pistol.

=== Sport-22 ===
The Sport-22 featured a unthreaded barrel and a 10-round rotary magazine to comply with the now expired 1994 U.S. firearms legislation which forbade the sale of the original TEC-22 model.

== See also ==
- Škorpion vz. 61 – Czechoslovak machine pistol
- TEC-9 – Semi-automatic pistol
