= Interdynamic MP-9 =

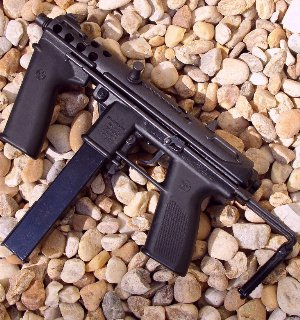
- Type: Submachine gun
- Place of origin: Sweden

Production history
- Produced: 1983–1984
- No. built: Believed fewer than 25 in select-fire configuration with buttstock

Specifications
- Mass: 1.7 kg (3.9 pounds)
- Length: 328 mm stock closed, 541 mm stock extended (13.25" stock closed, 21.3" stock extended)
- Barrel length: 173 mm (6.8 inches)
- Cartridge: 9×19mm Parabellum
- Action: Straight blowback, open bolt
- Rate of fire: 1000 rounds/min
- Muzzle velocity: 366–427 m/s (1200–1400 ft/s)
- Effective firing range: 55 m
- Feed system: 10, 20, 32, 36 and 50-round magazines

The Interdynamic MP-9 is a blowback-operated, fully automatic 9 mm caliber firearm, classified by the ATF as a submachine gun. It is made of inexpensive molded polymer and stamped steel parts. 10-, 20-, 32-, 36- and 50-round magazines are available.

The MP-9 came from a design that a Swedish company Interdynamic AB of Stockholm had for a cheap submachine gun for military applications. Interdynamic was unable to drum up any interest among governments, and the subgun never entered production in Sweden. Unwilling to give up on the design, Interdynamic set up a U.S. subsidiary intended principally to market a semiautomatic version, named the KG-9 after the two principal partners, George Kellgren and Carlos Garcia, to civilians. More about Kellgren and Garcia can be found under Intratec.

Interdynamic USA was forced by the ATF to redesign the KG-9 due to its ease of being converted to full auto. At the same time as a closed bolt being designed, per the BATF, the lower plastic receiver had to be retooled to place a metal serial number tag in the side as opposed to just stamping the serial number in the plastic magazine well. This version was named the KG-99 and it is this gun that was offered in an open bolt submachine gun configuration designated the MP-9. Placed side by side, the KG-99 and MP-9 upper and lower receivers are identical with the exception that the MP-9 has a bolt hold open slot milled in the upper and the tip of the muzzle has a compensation slot cut into it. Interdynamic produced a very small quantity of registered MP-9 submachine guns due to lack of demand by the general public. The MP-9 was made in two configurations, one with select fire capability and a collapsible stock (Interdynamic MP-9), and one that is fully automatic only with no stock. Production numbers are believed to be less than 50 total, perhaps as few as 24 in select-fire with the collapsible stock. More information on this type of gun can be found under Intratec TEC-DC9.

== Imitation made illegally in Europe ==
Quantities of an illegally-made 9mm machine pistol have been seized in Europe. They are somewhat similar to the Intratec TEC-9, and are marked "Intratec TEC-9".

== See also ==
- Intratec
- TEC-9
- Shipka
- Beretta M12
- Walther MP
- Spectre M4
