= Agram 2000 =

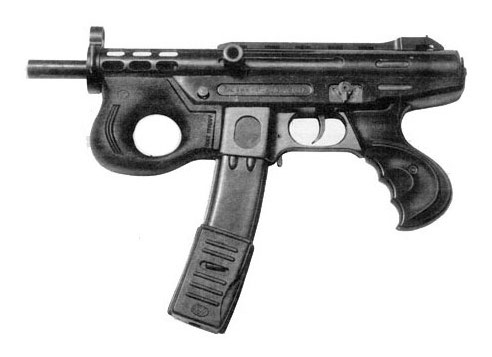
- A non-suppressed Agram-2000
- Type: Submachine gun
- Place of origin: Croatia

Service history
- In service: 1991–present
- Wars: Croatian War of Independence; Bosnian War; Kosovo War; Russo-Ukrainian War; Battle of Kyiv

Production history
- Designer: Ivan Vugrek
- Designed: 1990
- Manufacturer: Precizna Mehanika
- Produced: 1990-present
- Variants: Agram 1995; Agram 2002

Specifications
- Mass: 1.8 kg
- Length: 482 mm (with suppressor); 348mm (without suppressor)
- Barrel length: 200 mm
- Cartridge: 9×19mm Parabellum
- Caliber: 9mm
- Action: Blowback
- Rate of fire: 800 round/min
- Muzzle velocity: ~330 m/s (1083 ft/s)
- Feed system: 15-, 22-, or 32-round box magazine

The Agram 2000 is a Croatian submachine gun inspired by Beretta's model M12 and partially Intratec's TEC-9. The name "Agram" is the old German name for Zagreb, the capital of Croatia. It was originally developed in the 1990s in response to a Croatian Army need for a submachine gun during the Croatian War of Independence. It was never officially adopted by the Croatian Army. Infamously unreliable in the war period due to its poorly constructed magazines, it would often fail to feed rounds from the magazine. Mainly produced between 1990 and 1993, only a few more examples have been produced since 1997. It has become notorious for use by organized crime in Eastern Europe.

These weapons were used in the Kosovo War by the Kosovo Liberation Army. They were preferred due to its full-auto fire, provisions for silencer, flexible ammunition count and compact size.

Ukraine confiscated some from criminals and they were pressed into use with Territorial Defence Forces during the Battle of Kyiv.

== Specifications ==
Agram 2000 is a closed-bolt, hammer-fired, simple blowback submachine gun chambered for the 9×19mm Parabellum cartridge. Some sources report that it has a rate of fire of 800 rounds per minute. The barrel is slightly longer and a thread-on barrel sleeve is included to enable the attachment of a silencer or a muzzle brake. The barrel is vented just in front of the chamber, to reduce regular 9x19mm ammunition to subsonic velocity, and the suppressor telescopes back of the barrel to reduce overall length. However, a thread-on barrel sleeve is also included with the gun which can be used in place of the suppressor to seal off the barrel vents and maintain full ammunition velocity. It uses a proprietary magazine design, with magazines of 15-, 22-, and 32-round capacity produced. The charging handle is on the left-hand side of the receiver, just above the magazine.The bolt design has been based on that off the Intratec TEC-9. The fire selector is found just above the trigger which allows for safety, single-shot, and full-auto firing modes (S/1/A). The barrel shroud is perforated for heat dispersion and sports a front iron sight post. The rear sight is a flip-up sight that can dial its zero up to 150 metres (490 ft). The unique feature on this gun is the thumb-hole foregrip that ensures a firm grip and good recoil control while firing fully auto. The initial prototypes used a top folding shoulder stock, but the production model omitted this, and had no shoulder support. The materials used for making this weapon include stamped, sheet metal and molded plastic. The specifications for the buttstock do not exist. The Agram 2000 measures at about 13.8 inches (350 mm) without the sound suppressor on.

== Variants ==
- Agram 1995 – straight box magazine, no handguard
- Agram 2002 – straight box magazine, adjustable sight, reshaped plastic handguard

== Users ==
=== Current ===
- Ukraine: In use with the Territorial Defence Forces

=== Former ===
- Croatia
- Herzeg-Bosnia
- Republic of Bosnia and Herzegovina
- Kosovo Liberation Army
- Federal Republic of Yugoslavia
