= Federal Assault Weapons Ban =

United States federal law

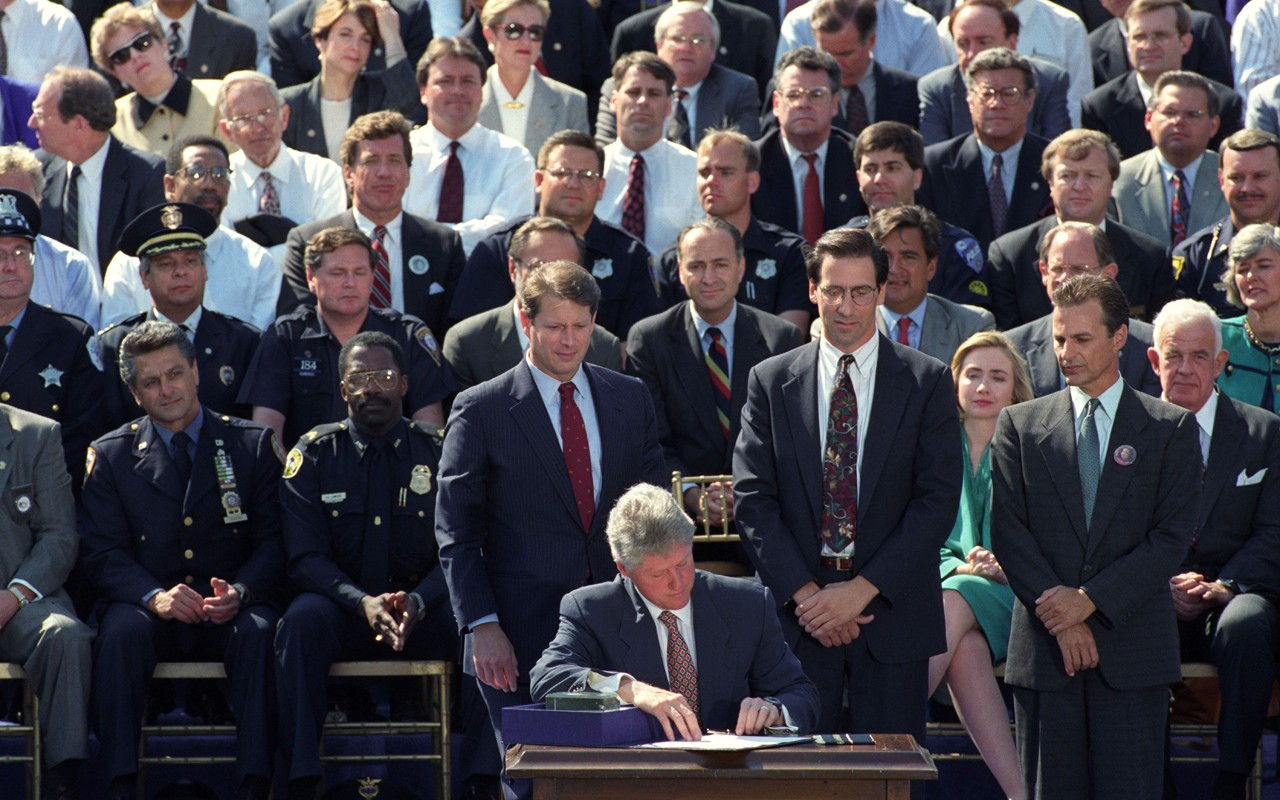
President Bill Clinton signing the bill into law

The Public Safety and Recreational Firearms Use Protection Act, popularly known as the Federal Assault Weapons Ban (AWB or FAWB), was subtitle A of title XI of the Violent Crime Control and Law Enforcement Act of 1994, a United States federal law which included a prohibition on the manufacture for civilian use of certain semi-automatic firearms that were defined as assault weapons as well as certain ammunition magazines that were defined as large capacity.

The 10-year ban was passed by the U.S. Congress on August 25, 1994, and was signed into law by President Bill Clinton on September 13, 1994. The ban applied only to weapons manufactured after the date of the ban's enactment. It expired on September 13, 2004, following its sunset provision. Several constitutional challenges were filed against provisions of the ban, but all were rejected by the courts. There have been multiple attempts to renew the ban, but none have succeeded.

Research regarding the effects of the ban is limited and inconclusive. There is insufficient evidence to determine the effectiveness of the ban on reducing the overall homicide rate as well as the total firearm homicide rate. The ban was in effect for a limited period and the vast majority of homicides are committed with weapons which were not covered by the FAWB. There is, however, some evidence that the ban reduced fatalities and injuries from mass shootings, as weapons considered "assault weapons" are more frequently used for those crimes.

== Background ==
Efforts to create restrictions on assault weapons at the federal government level intensified in 1989 after the shooting of a teacher and 34 children, five of whom died, in Stockton, California, with a semi-automatic Kalashnikov-pattern rifle. The Luby's shooting in October 1991, which left 23 people dead and 27 wounded, was another factor. The July 1993 101 California Street shooting that killed eight people and wounded six, also contributed to the passage of the ban. Two of the three firearms he used were TEC-9 semi-automatic handguns with Hell-Fire triggers. The ban tried to address public concerns about mass shootings by restricting firearms that met the criteria for what it defined as a "semiautomatic assault weapon," as well as magazines that met the criteria for what it defined as a "large capacity ammunition feeding device".

In November 1993, the proposed legislation passed the U.S. Senate. The bill's author, Dianne Feinstein (D-CA) and other advocates said that it was a weakened version of the original proposal. In May 1994, former presidents Gerald Ford, Jimmy Carter, and Ronald Reagan, wrote to the U.S. House of Representatives in support of banning "semi-automatic assault guns". They cited a 1993 CNN/USA Today/Gallup Poll that found 77 percent of Americans supported a ban on the manufacture, sale, and possession of such weapons.

US Representative Jack Brooks (D-TX), then chair of the House Judiciary Committee, tried unsuccessfully to remove the assault weapons ban section from the crime bill. The National Rifle Association of America (NRA) opposed the ban. In November 1993, NRA spokesman Bill McIntyre said that assault weapons "are used in only 1 per cent of all crimes", without acknowledging that crimes involving assault weapons are known to be far deadlier on a per-incident basis. The low usage statistic was supported in a 1999 Department of Justice brief. The legislation passed in September 1994 with the assault weapon ban section expiring in 2004 due to its sunset provision.

== Provisions ==
The Public Safety and Recreational Firearms Act was enacted as part of the Violent Crime Control and Law Enforcement Act of 1994. The prohibitions expired on September 13, 2004.

The Act prohibited the manufacture, transfer, or possession of "semiautomatic assault weapons", as defined by the Act. "Weapons banned were identified either by specific make or model (including copies or duplicates thereof, in any caliber), or by specific characteristics that slightly varied according to whether the weapon was a pistol, rifle, or shotgun" (see below). The Act also prohibited the manufacture of "large capacity ammunition feeding devices" (LCAFDs) except for sale to government, law enforcement or military, though magazines made before the effective date ("pre-ban" magazines) were legal to possess and transfer. An LCAFD was defined as "any magazine, belt, drum, feed strip, or similar device manufactured after the date [of the act] that has the capacity of, or that can be readily restored or converted to accept, more than 10 rounds of ammunition."

The Act included several exemptions and exclusions from its prohibitions:

- The Act included a "grandfather clause" to allow for the possession and transfer of weapons and ammunition that "were otherwise lawfully possessed on the date of enactment".
- The Act exempted some 650 firearm types or models (including their copies and duplicates) which would be considered manufactured in October 1993. The list included the Ruger Mini-14 Auto Loading Rifle without side folding stock, Ruger Mini Thirty Rifle, Iver Johnson M-1 Carbine, Marlin Model 9 Camp Carbine, Marlin Model 45 Carbine, and others. The complete list is in section 110106, Appendix A to section 922 of Title 18. This list was non-exhaustive.
- The Act "also exempted any firearm that (1) is manually operated by bolt, pump, lever, or slide action; (2) has been rendered permanently inoperable; or (3) is an antique firearm".
- The Act "also did not apply to any semiautomatic rifle that cannot accept a detachable magazine that holds more than ten rounds of ammunition or semiautomatic shotguns that cannot hold more than five rounds of ammunition in a fixed or detachable magazine." Tubular magazine fed rimfire guns were exempted regardless of tubular magazine capacity.
- The Act provided an exemption for the use of "semiautomatic assault weapons and LCAFDs to be manufactured for, transferred to, and possessed by law enforcement and for authorized testing or experimentation purposes" as well as transfers for federal-security purposes under the Atomic Energy Act and "possession by retired law enforcement officers who are not otherwise a prohibited possessor under law".

In 1989, the George H. W. Bush administration banned the importation of foreign-made, semiautomatic rifles deemed not to have "a legitimate sporting use". It did not affect similar but domestically manufactured rifles. (The Gun Control Act of 1968 gives discretion to the Attorney General of the United States to choose whether to "authorize a firearm or ammunition to be imported or brought into the United States", under what is known as "the sporting purposes test".) Following the enactment of the Federal Assault Weapons Ban, the ATF determined that "certain semiautomatic assault rifles could no longer be imported even though they were permitted to be imported under the 1989 'sporting purposes test' because they had been modified to remove all of their military features other than the ability to accept a detachable magazine" and so in April 1998, it "prohibited the importation of 56 such rifles, determining that they did not meet the 'sporting purposes test'".

=== Definition of assault weapon ===
Under the Assault Weapons Ban of 1994, the definition of "semi-automatic assault weapon" ("SAW") (commonly shortened to "assault weapon") included specific semi-automatic firearm models by name and other semi-automatic firearms that possessed two or more from a set certain features:

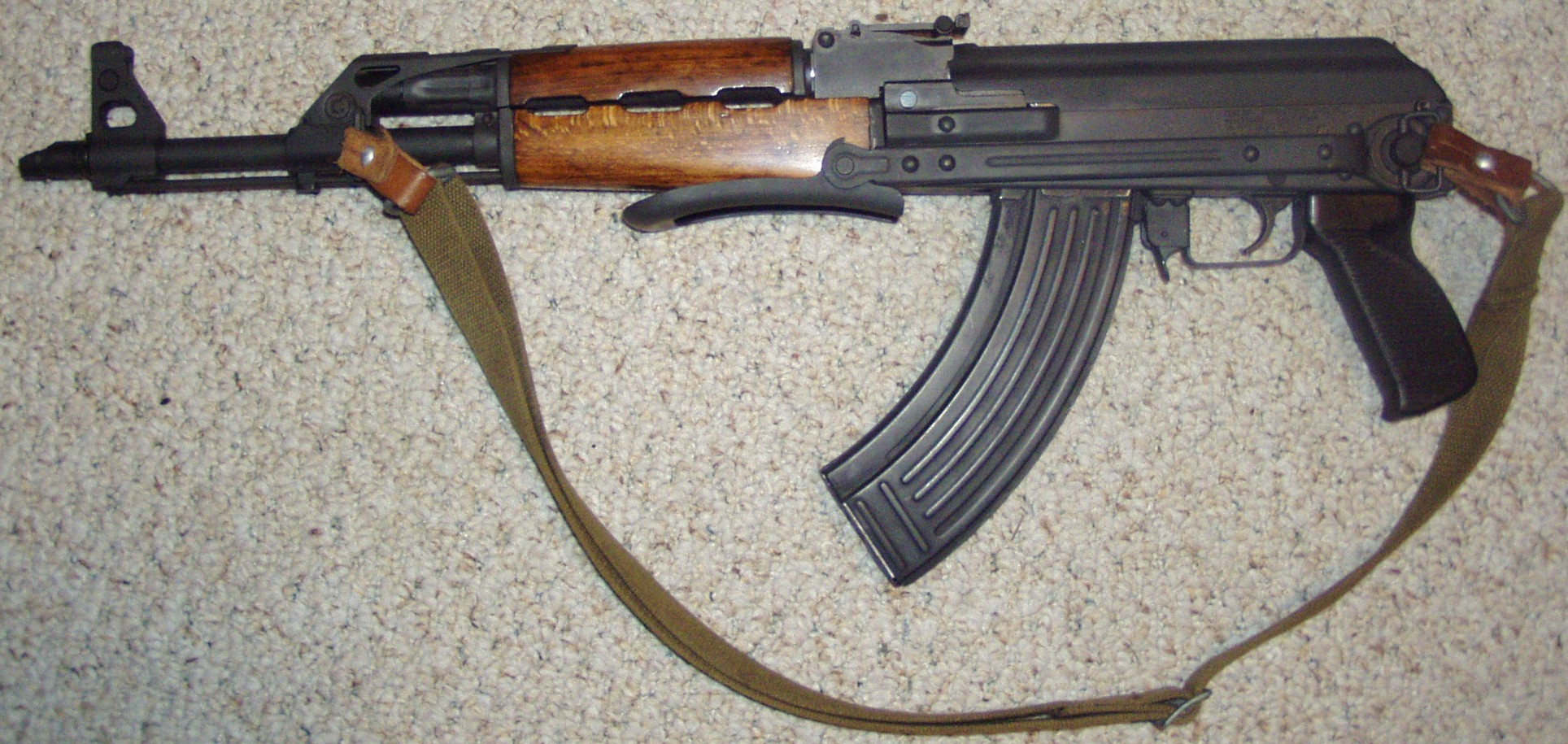
A semi-automatic Yugoslavian M70AB2 rifle

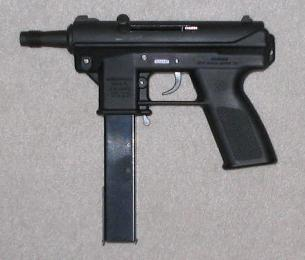
An Intratec TEC-9 Mini with 32-round magazine; a semi-automatic pistol formerly classified as an assault weapon under federal law

- Semi-automatic rifles able to accept detachable magazines and has two or more of the following:
  - Folding or telescoping stock
  - Pistol grip
  - Bayonet mount
  - Flash hider or threaded barrel designed to accommodate one
  - Grenade launcher
- Semi-automatic pistols with detachable magazines and two or more of the following:
  - Magazine that attaches outside the pistol grip
  - Threaded barrel to attach barrel extender, flash suppressor, hand grip, or suppressor
  - Barrel shroud safety feature that prevents burns to the operator
  - A manufactured weight of 50 ounces (1.42kg) or more when the pistol is unloaded
  - A semi-automatic version of a fully automatic firearm
- Semi-automatic shotguns with two or more of the following:
  - Folding or telescoping stock
  - Pistol grip
  - A fixed magazine capacity over 5 rounds
  - Detachable magazine

The law also categorically banned the following makes and models of semi-automatic firearms and any copies or duplicates of them, in any caliber:

Name of firearm	Pre-ban federal legal status
Norinco, Mitchell, and Poly Technologies Avtomat Kalashnikovs (AKs) (all models)	Imports banned in 1989*
Action Arms Israeli Military Industries Uzi and Galil	Imports banned in 1989*
Beretta AR-70 (SC-70)	Imports banned in 1989*
Colt AR-15	Legal
Fabrique National FN/FAL, FN-LAR, FNC	Imports banned in 1989*
SWD (MAC type) M-10, M-11, M11/9, M12	Legal
Steyr AUG	Imports banned in 1989*
INTRATEC TEC-9, TEC-DC9, TEC-22	Legal
Revolving cylinder shotguns such as (or similar to) the Street Sweeper and Striker 12	Legal

=== Cosmetic features ===
Gun control advocates and gun rights advocates have referred to at least some of the features outlined in the federal Assault Weapon Ban of 1994 as cosmetic. The NRA Institute for Legislative Action and the Violence Policy Center both used the term in publications that were released by them in September 2004, when the ban expired. In May 2012, the Law Center to Prevent Gun Violence said that "the inclusion in the list of features that were purely cosmetic in nature created a loophole that allowed manufacturers to successfully circumvent the law by making minor modifications to the weapons they already produced." The term was repeated in several stories after the 2012 Aurora, Colorado shooting and the Sandy Hook Elementary School shooting. Senator Marco Rubio cited that issue during a town hall forum, responding to questions from survivors of the 2018 Stoneman-Douglas High School shooting in Parkland, Florida.

== Legal challenges ==
Several constitutional challenges were filed against provisions of the ban, but all were rejected by the courts. There were multiple attempts to renew the ban, but none succeeded.

A February 2013 Congressional Research Service (CRS) report to Congress said that the "Assault Weapons Ban of 1994 was unsuccessfully challenged as violating several constitutional provisions" but that challenges to three constitutional provisions were easily dismissed. The ban did not make up an impermissible bill of attainder. It was not unconstitutionally vague. Also, it was ruled to be compatible with the Ninth Amendment by the Ninth Circuit Court of Appeals.

Challenges to two other provisions took more time to decide.

In evaluating challenges to the ban under the Commerce Clause, the court first evaluated Congress's authority to regulate under the clause and then analyzed the ban's prohibitions on manufacture, transfer, and possession. The court held that "it is not even arguable that the manufacture and transfer of 'semiautomatic assault weapons' for a national market cannot be regulated as activity substantially affecting interstate commerce." It also held that the "purpose of the ban on possession has an 'evident commercial nexus'."

The law was also challenged under the Equal Protection Clause. It was argued that it banned some semi-automatic weapons that were functional equivalents of exempted semi-automatic weapons and that to do so, based upon a mix of other characteristics, served no legitimate governmental interest. The reviewing court held that it was "entirely rational for Congress... to choose to ban those weapons commonly used for criminal purposes and to exempt those weapons commonly used for recreational purposes." It also found that each characteristic served to make the weapon "potentially more dangerous" and were not "commonly used on weapons designed solely for hunting."

The Federal Assault Weapons Ban was never directly challenged under the Second Amendment. Since its 2004 expiration, there has been debate on how the ban would fare in light of cases decided in following years, especially District of Columbia v. Heller (2008).

== Effects ==
=== Studies of firearm homicides ===
Following the Federal Assault Weapons Ban, Congress mandated a study on the impact of the law. A 6.7% reduction in homicide rate was found but the result was not statistically significant. The authors suggested this was due to the brief time period in which the law was in effect.

A 2017 review on the effects of firearm laws on homicides found that limited data from 4 studies published regarding the Federal Assault Weapons Ban did not provide significant evidence that the ban was associated with a decrease on overall firearm homicides.

A 2020 RAND Corporation review of five studies regarding the effects of state assault weapon bans on violent crime concluded that there is inconclusive evidence of an effect on total homicides and firearm homicides.

A 2014 study found no impacts on homicide rates with an assault weapon ban. A 2014 book published by Oxford University Press noted that "There is no compelling evidence that [the ban] saved lives," but added that "a more stringent or longer-lasting ban might well have been more effective."

=== Studies of mass shootings ===
Total deaths in US mass shootings—defined as four or more people shot and killed in one incident, excluding the perpetrator, at a public place, excluding gang-related killings

After the 2004 expiration of the Assault Weapons Ban, the firearms industry embraced the AR-15's political and cultural significance for marketing. Almost every major gunmaker produces its own version, with ~16 million Americans owning at least one.

A 2019 DiMaggio et al. study looked at mass shooting data for 1981 to 2017 and found that mass-shooting fatalities were 70% less likely to occur during the 1994 to 2004 federal ban period, and that the ban was associated with a 0.1% reduction in total firearm homicide fatalities due to the reduction in mass-shootings' contribution to total homicides.

A 2020 RAND Corporation review of five studies regarding the effects of state assault weapon bans concluded that evidence for an effect on mass shootings is inconclusive while limited evidence was found that high-capacity magazine bans may decrease mass shootings.

A 2015 study by Mark Gius, professor of economics at Quinnipiac University, studied the law's impact on public mass shootings. Gius defined this subset of mass shootings as those occurring in a relatively public place, targeted random victims, were not otherwise related to a crime (a robbery or act of terrorism), and that involved four or more victim fatalities. Gius found that fatalities and injuries due to mass shootings were statistically lower during the period the federal ban was active. Gius concluded that although the study showed assault weapons bans are effective in reducing mass shooting fatalities, their effects on the overall murder rate are probably minimal at best. This is due to the fact that assault weapons are used much more frequently in mass shootings than they are in murders in general. Gius calculated that in 2012 there were 72 fatalities due to mass public shootings of which at least 30 were committed using a rifle. In the same year, there were 12765 murders, of which only 322 were committed using a rifle.

A 2015 study found a small decrease in the rate of mass shootings followed by increases beginning after the ban was lifted.

The Columbine High School massacre, in which two shooters murdered 13 people, occurred in 1999 while the ban was in place. One of the shooters used a semi-automatic pistol and high-capacity magazines that were prospectively banned by the law.

=== Studies of gun violence ===
According to research done by the Violence Policy Center, in 2016 one in four law enforcement officers killed in the line of duty were killed by an assault weapon. A 2018 study examined the types of crime guns recovered by law enforcement in ten different cities and found that assault weapons and semiautomatic guns outfitted with large capacity magazines generally accounted for between 22 and 36% of crime guns recovered by police.

A 2013 study showed that the expiration of the FAWB in 2004 "led to immediate violence increases within areas of Mexico located close to American states where sales of assault weapons became legal. The estimated effects are sizable... the additional homicides stemming from the FAWB expiration represent 21% of all homicides in these municipalities during 2005 and 2006."

In 2013, Christopher S. Koper, a criminology scholar, reviewed the literature on the ban's effects and concluded that its effects on crimes committed with assault weapons were mixed due to its various loopholes. He stated that the ban did not seem to affect gun crime rates, and suggested that it might have been able to reduce shootings if it had been renewed in 2004.

In 2004, a research report commissioned by the National Institute of Justice found that if the ban was renewed, the effects on gun violence would likely be small and perhaps too small for reliable measurement, because rifles in general, including rifles referred to as "assault rifles" or "assault weapons," are rarely used in gun crimes. That study, by the Jerry Lee Center of Criminology, University of Pennsylvania, found no significant evidence that either the assault weapons ban or the ban on magazines holding more than 10 rounds had reduced gun murders. The report found that the share of gun crimes involving assault weapons had declined by 17 to 72 percent in the studied localities. The authors reported that "there has been no discernible reduction in the lethality and injuriousness of gun violence, based on indicators like the percentage of gun crimes resulting in death or the share of gunfire incidents resulting in injury." The report also concluded that it was "premature to make definitive assessments of the ban's impact on gun crime," since millions of assault weapons and large-capacity magazines manufactured prior to the ban had been exempted and would thus be in circulation for years following the ban's implementation.

In 2003, the Task Force on Community Preventive Services, an independent, non-federal task force, examined an assortment of firearms laws, including the AWB, and found "insufficient evidence to determine the effectiveness of any of the firearms laws reviewed for preventing violence." A review of firearms research from 2001 by the National Research Council "did not reveal any clear impacts on gun violence outcomes." The committee noted that guns were relatively rarely used criminally before the ban and that its maximum potential effect on gun violence outcomes would likely be very small.

About a 2001 study the National Research Council in 2005, stated "evaluation of the short-term effects of the 1994 federal assault weapons ban did not reveal any clear impacts on gun violence outcomes."

A book published by John Lott in 1998 found no impact of these bans on violent crime rates. Koper, Woods, and Roth studies focus on gun murders, while Lott's look at murder, rape, robbery, and aggravated assaults. Unlike their work, Lott's research accounted for state assault weapon bans and twelve other different types of gun control laws.

=== Economic ===
A 2002 study by Koper and Roth found that around the time when the ban became law, assault weapon prices increased significantly, but the increase was reversed in the several months afterward by a surge in assault weapons production that occurred just before the ban took effect. John Lott found that the bans may have reduced the number of gun shows by over 20 percent. Koper also discovered that street prices of assault weapons and other guns can be three to six times higher than legal retail prices in jurisdictions with strict gun controls and lower level of gun ownership.

== Efforts at renewal ==
Attorney General Eric Holder reiterated the Obama administration's desire to reinstate the ban. The mention came in response to a question during a joint press conference with DEA Acting Administrator Michele Leonhart, discussing efforts to crack down on Mexican drug cartels. Attorney General Holder said that "there are just a few gun-related changes that we would like to make, and among them would be to reinstitute the ban on the sale of assault weapons."

Efforts to pass a new federal assault weapons ban were made in December 2012 after the Sandy Hook Elementary School shooting, in Newtown, Connecticut. On January 24, 2013, Senator Feinstein introduced S. 150, the Assault Weapons Ban of 2013 (AWB 2013). The bill was similar to the 1994 ban, but differed in that it would not expire after 10 years, and it used a one-feature test for a firearm to qualify as an assault weapon rather than the two-feature test of the defunct ban. The GOP Congressional delegation from Texas and the NRA condemned Feinstein's bill. On March 14, 2013, the Senate Judiciary Committee approved a version of the bill along party lines. On April 17, 2013, AWB 2013 failed on a Senate vote of 40 to 60.

On March 23, 2021, President Joe Biden proposed a new ban on assault weapons after the 2021 Atlanta spa shootings and 2021 Boulder shooting both occurred in the previous week.

On July 29, 2022, the House of Representatives narrowly voted in favor of passing new sweeping firearms restrictions, 217 in favor to 213 against. The bill went to the Senate where it lingered until expiring at the end of the term.

== See also ==
- Assault weapon
- Gun politics in the United States
- National Firearms Agreement (Australia)
