= Spectre M4 =

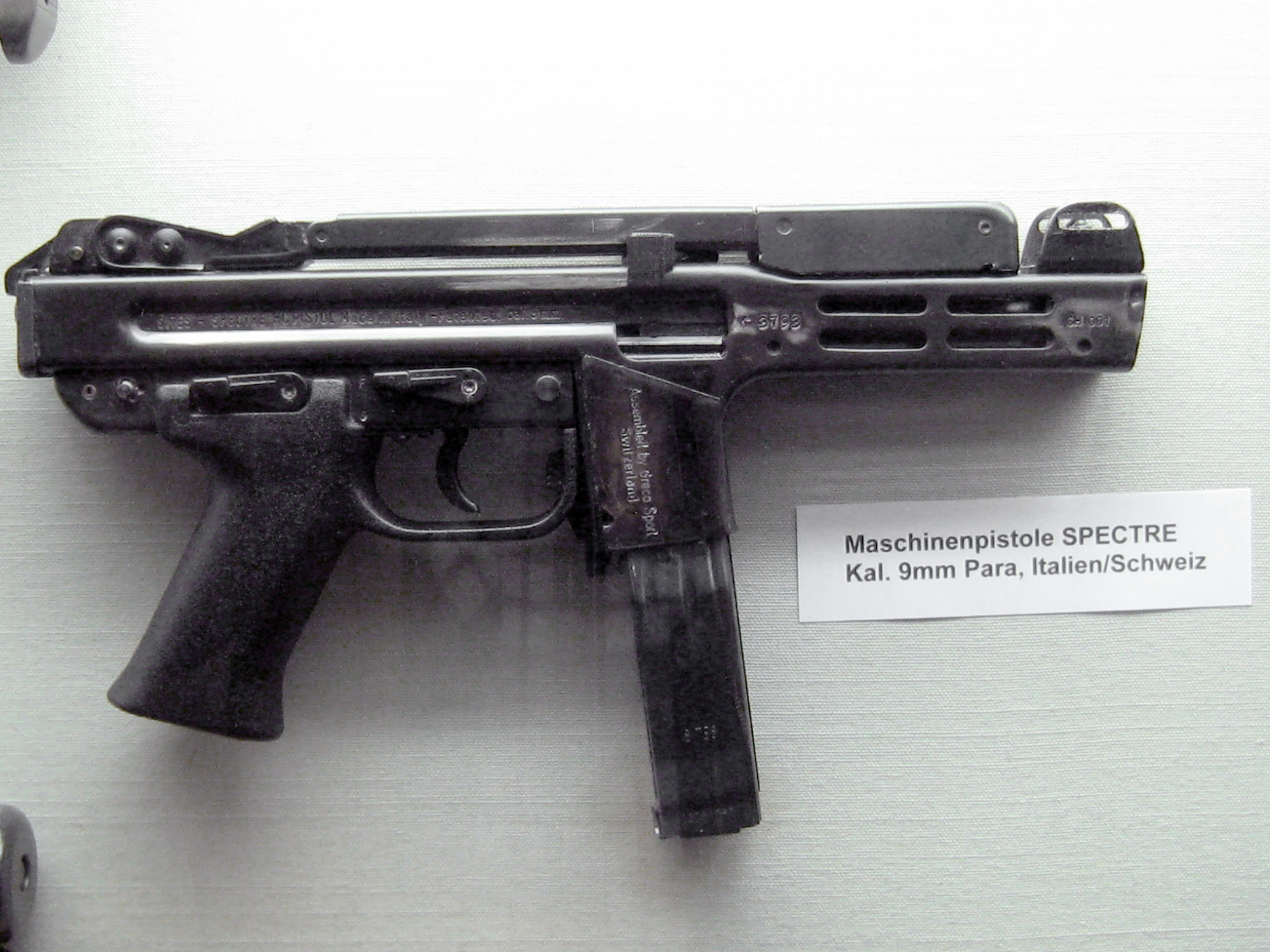
- The Spectre M4 equipped with a suppressor.
- Type: Submachine gun
- Place of origin: Italy

Service history
- Used by: See Users
- Wars: Lebanese Civil War; Kosovo War; Yugoslav Wars

Production history
- Designer: Roberto Teppa & Claudio Gritti
- Designed: 1980
- Manufacturer: SITES (Società Italiana Tecnologie Speciali S.p.A., later GRECO SPORT, S.A.)
- Produced: 1984–2001
- Variants: SITES "Falcon" (a.k.a. the "Spectre-HC") semi-automatic pistol (civilian); SITES "Ranger" semi-automatic carbine (civilian).

Specifications
- Mass: 2.9 kg (6.393 lb)
- Length: 350 mm (13.78 in), folded; 580 mm (22.835 in), unfolded
- Barrel length: 130 mm (5.12 in)
- Cartridge: 9×19mm Parabellum
- Action: Blowback, closed bolt
- Rate of fire: 850 rounds/min
- Effective firing range: 150 m (492 ft)
- Feed system: 30-round box or 50-round casket magazines, magazines for civilian-grade versions were factory-modified for 15-round, 10-round or 5-round capacity.
- Sights: Iron

Diagram of the Spectre M4 casket magazine.

The Spectre M4 is an Italian submachine gun that was produced by the SITES factory in Turin. It was designed by Roberto Teppa and Claudio Gritti in the mid-1980s. Production in Italy ceased in the year 1997, with the closure of SITES, but proceeded in very small numbers in Switzerland through Greco Sport S.A., a company founded by Gritti, until 2001. The Spectre is a compact and light weapon, designed for instant firepower in close quarter combat at short ranges. The 4 models have top-folding buttstocks, and were available with or without a forward handgrip ahead of the magazine housing. The largely steel Spectre has a polymer overmolded grip, magazine release and safety/selector levers.

== Design details ==
The Spectre is a linear-hammer fired blowback firearm operating from a closed bolt. The trigger group is double-action with a decocker.

When the decocker is activated the linear hammer is dropped while a small flap that contacts the firing pin is retracted. When the trigger is pulled in the double-action-like mode, the linear hammer is retracted then dropped, firing the gun. This allows the shooter to safely carry a round in the chamber and fire immediately as the double-action trigger eliminates the need for cocking prior to shooting. A manual safety is provided. Unconventional 50-round and 30-round capacity, quad-column casket magazines are provided with the Spectre, but it can also use conventional 2-column magazines.

== Civilian variants ==
Versions of the SITES "Spectre" M4 submachine gun specifically made for the civilian market have been around since the middle 1980s and up to the late 1990s, their production suffering a major backlash when the US Federal Assault Weapons Ban prohibited the import and sale of them on the American market, the biggest and most lucrative for this kind of item. The civilian-grade variants of the SITES "Spectre" M4 have namely been a semi-automatic pistol called the SITES "Falcon" (marketed in the United States as the "Spectre-HC") and a semi-automatic sub-carbine called the SITES "Ranger". These weapons retain the main layout of the original "Spectre" submachine gun, are incapable of fully automatic fire, and the original magazine capacity is reduced for marketing in countries where the law requires it (such as Italy).

- The SITES "Falcon" (or "Spectre-HC") pistol may or may not be encountered with the original top-folding stock and foregrip (the samples sold in the United States as the "Spectre-HC" generally feature none of these; the "Falcon" sold in Italy feature both, with the foregrip being removable).
- The SITES "Ranger" sub-carbine, which was a distinctly Italian market gun, features the foregrip (which is removable), a longer barrel, and the top-folding stock is permanently locked into open position to comply with the requirements of the Italian laws about the minimum allowed length for civilian-legal long arms. The top-folding stock on the SITES "Ranger" subcarbine was, however, engineered to be easily removable for storage. In the version of this carbine sold in Italy, the removal of the stock was made harder, requiring the use of tools, and proceeding to effectively shorten the weapon by this way could be prosecuted as a criminal offense. In other countries (where legal), the removal of the stock in this and other versions was easier.

== Successors ==
In 2025, B&T released the KH9 submachine gun, which was inspired by the Spectre M4.

== Users ==
- Lebanon: Used during the Lebanese Civil War.
- Kosovo: Used by Kosovo Liberation Army and National Liberation Army

== See also ==
- List of submachine guns
