= Walther MP =

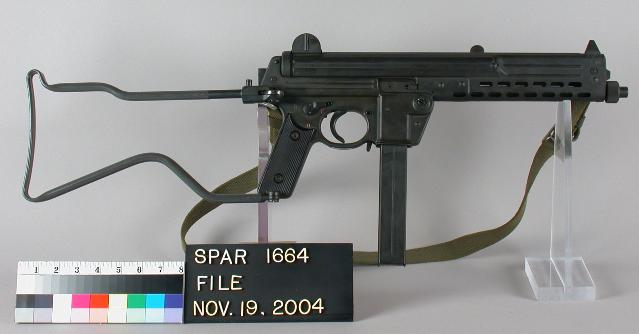
- Type: Submachine gun
- Place of origin: West Germany

Service history
- In service: 1963–present
- Used by: See Users
- Wars: Congo Crisis; 1972 Munich attack Portuguese Colonial War; Rhodesian Bush War; Carnation Revolution; Lebanese Civil War; Colombian conflict Operation Eagle Claw; Armed conflict for control of the favelas

Production history
- Manufacturer: Carl Walther GmbH
- Produced: 1963—1985
- Variants: MPK; MPL

Specifications
- Mass: 2.8 kg (6.17 lb) (MPK); 3.0 kg (6.6 lb) (MPL)
- Length: (w/stock open/closed): 659 / 373 mm (25.94/14.7 in) (MPK); 749 / 462 mm (29.4/18.2 in) (MPL)
- Barrel length: 173 mm (6.8 in) (MPK); 260 mm (10.2 in) (MPL)
- Cartridge: 9×19mm Parabellum
- Action: Blowback
- Rate of fire: 550 rounds/min
- Effective firing range: 100 m (MPK); 200 m (MPL)
- Feed system: 32-round detachable box magazine
- Sights: Iron sights

The Walther MP (Maschinenpistole) series is a family of 9×19mm Parabellum submachine guns produced in West Germany from 1963 to 1985 by Walther.

== History ==
In the late 1950s, Walther began designing submachine guns in line with military and police re-arming plans in West Germany. This new submachine gun became the Walther MPL / K, and mass production began in 1963.

When released, it was adopted by West German intelligence agencies, as well as U.S. military special forces in West Germany, such as the 39th Special Forces Detachment.

In West Germany, the Navy adopted the MPL, and some police agencies, like the West Berlin Police, adopted either the MPL, the MPK, or both. During the 1972 Munich Olympics and the ensuing terrorist incident, the local police were equipped with the MPL. However, most of the policemen dispatched at this time were only trained as patrol police officers and had little experience in using the MPL. The counter-terrorist unit GSG-9, which was established after the incident, adopted the H&K MP5 as their service submachine gun instead of the Walther MP. As the MP5 became more prevalent, it began to eclipse the Walther MP's sales until the Walther product was discontinued.

In addition, exports to other countries were also carried out. Many countries, such as Brazil, Colombia, and Venezuela, only acquired the compact MPK variant. Walther MP was also used as a submachine gun for special forces in the United States. In addition to being used by U.S. Navy SEALs during the Vietnam War, it is said to have been used in Operation Ivory Coast by the United States Army Special Forces. The Delta Force used the Walther MP during the transitional period of the U.S. Army, when the M3 submachine gun was starting to get phased out in favour of the MP5. Members of the Delta Force were equipped with the Walther MP during the abortive Operation Eagle Claw.

At the end of its lifespan, its sales were sluggish. The production of the MP ended in 1983 with the final production was about 27,000 guns.

== Variants ==
There are two versions of the Walther MP: the MPK (Maschinenpistole Kurz or "short machine pistol") and the MPL (Maschinenpistole Lang or "long machine pistol"). The only difference between MPK and MPL guns is the length of the barrel, and that the MPL's iron sights have 100 and 200 meter settings.

== Description ==
The mechanism is simple blowback, but with an unusual bolt design, similar in concept but distinct from that of a telescoping bolt. In the Walther, most of the mass of the bolt consists of a hollow tubular weight that is actually placed above and parallel to the barrel, housed in a separate channel in which it reciprocates when the gun is fired. Fixed rigidly to the underside of this heavy tube is an additional steel block that performs most of the tasks of a standard sub-machine gun bolt, that is, this part chambers the rounds and seals them in the chamber, fires them and extracts the empty cartridges. This section is however very small and light in comparison to the bolts of more conventional simple blowback sub-machine guns, as most of the necessary mass and thus inertia is provided by the tubular weight above. This weight extends well ahead of the chamber when the gun is in battery, and also contains the main spring, and so the design is horizontally compact and permits both guns to feature relatively long barrels for their overall length. The receiver is made from stamped steel, with plentiful ventilation slots; and the prominent cocking handle is located on its left front. A selective fire switch is also on both the left and right side of the receiver, behind the trigger, allowing for ambidextrous use.

During the Cold War, the MP was issued to many special forces units and was designed to use a suppressor. However, the Walther MP had a very loud mechanical operating noise, and its quietness was limited. In a test in which a silencer was attached and the sound of shooting subsonic bullets was measured from a distance of 5 m, a peak value of about 116–118 decibels was measured.

Both guns feature side-folding buttstocks, made from thin steel tubes wrapped in a rubber coating.

== Users ==
- Colombia: MPK variant.
- Germany: Used by various police forces.
- Mexico: Mexican Navy.
- Portugal: MPK variant used by the Portuguese Navy and the Portuguese Marine Corps.
- United States: Used by 1st SFOD-D during Operation Eagle Claw and Detachment A, Special Forces, Berlin.
- Venezuela: MPK variant.
- Zimbabwe: MPK variant.

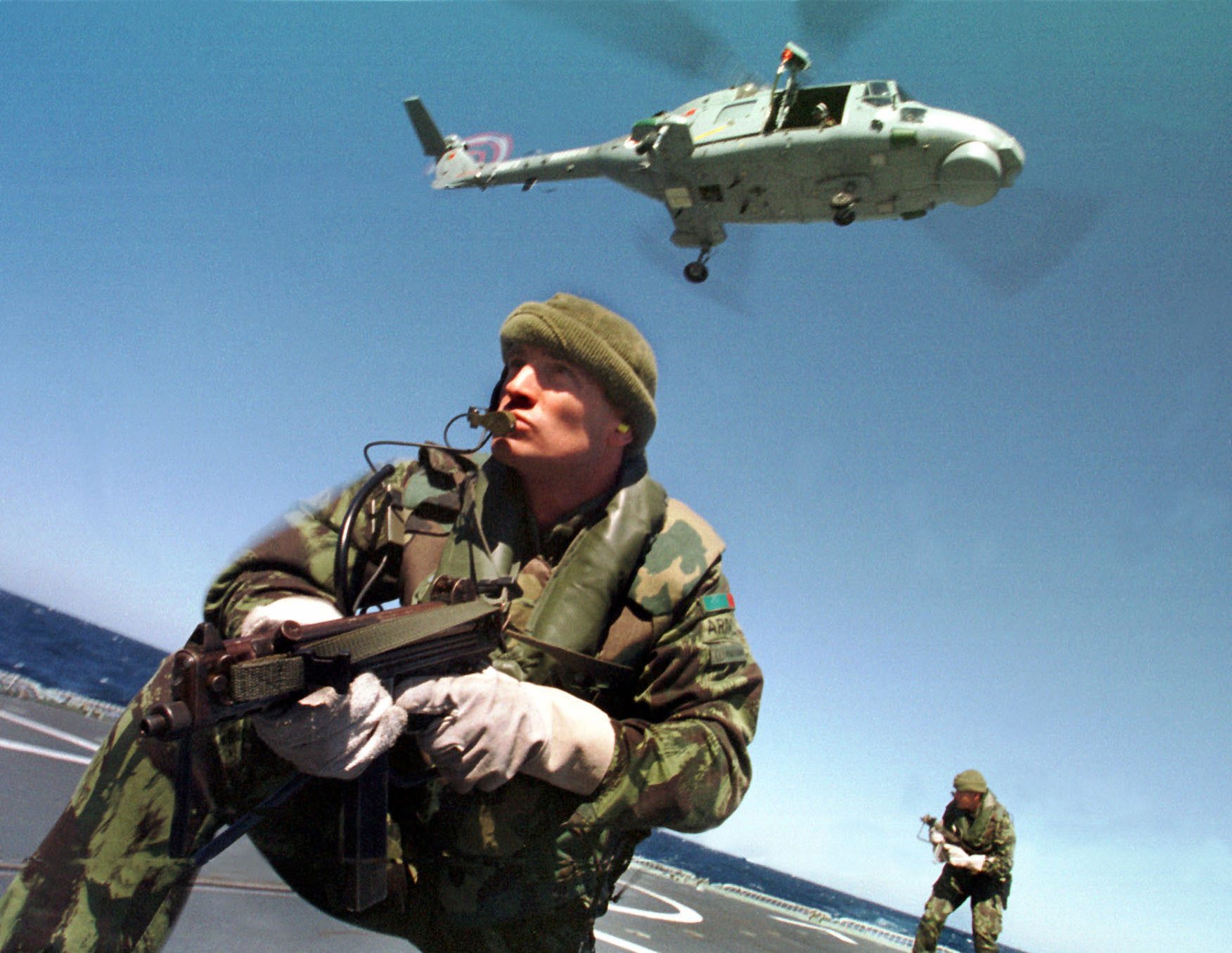
Portuguese Marines during a training exercise. The weapon shown is a Walther MPK (short-barrel variant), not the longer MPL.

=== Former users ===
- Brazil: MPK variant formerly used by Civil Police of Rio de Janeiro State.
- West Germany: Used by various naval units in the 1960s.

== See also ==
- Franchi LF-57
