= Assault weapons legislation in the United States =

Restrictions on firearms ownership

U.S. states and territories that have enacted assault weapons bans Long guns and handguns Handguns only

Assault weapons legislation in the United States are bills and laws (active, theoretical, expired, proposed, or failed) that define and restrict or make illegal the manufacture, transfer, and possession of assault weapons. How these firearms are defined and regulated varies from jurisdiction to jurisdiction; generally, this constitutes a list of specific firearms and combinations of features on semiautomatic firearms.

The Federal Assault Weapons Ban enacted in 1994 expired in 2004. Attempts to renew this ban have failed, as have attempts to pass a new ban, such as the Assault Weapons Ban of 2013 (AWB 2013). Twelve states with a third of the U.S. population have assault weapons bans: three were enacted before the 1994 federal ban, four more were passed before the federal ban expired, and five passed after the federal ban expired. The majority of states have no assault weapons ban, although two, Minnesota and Virginia, have training and background check requirements for purchasers of assault weapons that are stricter than those for ordinary firearms. On June 4, 2021, and again in 2023, a federal judge struck down the three-decade-long ban in California, though it is pending appeal by the California Attorney General. On July 17, 2026, a federal judge declared New Jersey's assault weapons ban unconstitutional. It was stayed pending the appeal to the Supreme Court. While there are no statewide assault weapon bans in Colorado, local bans exist in certain cities or counties in the state. In addition to state bans, Washington, D.C., and some U.S. counties and municipalities have assault weapons laws.

The 1994 federal and 1989 state ban in California were prompted by the 1989 Cleveland Elementary School shooting in Stockton, California. Over the last few decades, there has been an increase in the use of semi-automatic rifles in mass shootings. At least one rifle was used in about 44% of mass public shootings since the 2012 Aurora, Colorado shooting. The U.S. suffers the highest death toll from gun violence among high income countries and the 2023 Covenant School shooting was the 129th such mass shooting in America since the beginning of that year. Existing and proposed weapon legislation often come under renewed interest in the wake of major mass shootings, such as the Robb Elementary School shooting in Uvalde, Texas.

Total deaths in US mass shootings—defined as four or more people shot and killed in one incident, excluding the perpetrator, at a public place, excluding gang-related killings

After the 2004 expiration of the Assault Weapons Ban, the firearms industry embraced the AR-15's political and cultural significance for marketing. Almost every major gunmaker produces its own version, with ~16 million Americans owning at least one.

== 1994 federal assault weapons ban ==
In January 1989, 34 children and a teacher were shot in Stockton, California. The gunman used a semi-automatic Type 56; five children perished. President George H. W. Bush banned all imports of semi-automatic rifles in March 1989, and made the ban permanent in July 1989. The assault weapons ban tried to address public concern about mass shootings while limiting the impact on recreational firearms use.

In November 1993, the ban passed the United States Senate. The author of the ban, Dianne Feinstein (D-CA), and other advocates said that it was a weakened version of the original proposal. In January 1994, Josh Sugarmann, executive director of the Violence Policy Center, said handguns and assault weapons should be banned. In May of that year, former presidents Gerald Ford, Jimmy Carter, and Ronald Reagan wrote to the United States House of Representatives in support of banning "semi-automatic assault guns". They cited a 1993 CNN/USA Today/Gallup Poll that found 77 percent of Americans supported a ban on the manufacture, sale, and possession of such weapons. Rep. Jack Brooks (D-TX), then chair of the House Judiciary Committee, tried to remove the ban from the crime bill but failed.

The Public Safety and Recreational Firearms Use Protection Act, commonly called the federal Assault Weapons Ban (AWB and AWB 1994), was enacted in September 1994. The ban, including a ban on extended-capacity magazines defined as more than ten rounds, became defunct (expired) in September 2004 per a 10-year sunset provision.

== Proposed federal assault weapons bans ==
=== 114th Congress ===
The proposed bill H.R.4269, the Assault Weapons Ban of 2015, was introduced on December 16, 2015, to the 114th United States Congress, sponsored by Representative David N. Cicilline of Rhode Island along with 123 original co-sponsors. It currently has 149 co-sponsors. This legislation states that its purpose is "To regulate assault weapons, to ensure that the right to keep and bear arms is not unlimited, and for other purposes."

The proposed legislation targets various firearm accessories, including the barrel shroud (a safety covering for the barrel of the firearm to prevent the operator from burning his or her hands as the barrel becomes heated after the firing of multiple rounds), pistol grip, and certain types of firearm stocks such as telescoping or collapsing stocks. Also included are lists of various classes and models of firearms, including semi-automatic firearms, AR-15 style rifles, assault weapons, semi-automatic pistols, semi-automatic shotguns, and others, some of which have already been banned or restricted under existing legislation including grenade launchers. The legislation also proscribes magazines which would have a capacity of more than 10 rounds.

=== 117th Congress ===
On July 29, 2022, the U.S. House of Representatives passed the Assault Weapons Ban of 2022 (H.R. 1808). The bill is somewhat similar to the Federal Assault Weapons Ban that was in force from 1994 to 2004. It defines certain semi-automatic firearms as assault weapons, and prohibits their manufacture, sale, transfer, or possession. Existing assault weapons would be grandfathered in – that is, they would be legal to possess, and legal to sell or transfer through a federally licensed gun dealer. The bill also exempts law enforcement agencies and retired law enforcement officers.

Defined as an assault weapon is any centerfire semi-automatic rifle with a detachable magazine and one or more of these features: a pistol grip, a forward grip, a folding, telescoping, or detachable stock, a grenade launcher, a barrel shroud, or a threaded barrel. A number of other rifles, shotguns, and pistols are also defined as assault weapons, including some specific makes and models.

Additionally, the proposed law defines magazines that can hold more than 15 rounds of ammunition as large capacity ammunition feeding devices, and prohibits their manufacture, sale, transfer, or possession. Existing magazines that can hold more than 15 rounds would be legal to possess, but not to sell or transfer. Magazines for .22 caliber rimfire ammunition are not included in the ban.

The bill passed the House by a vote of 217 to 213. Voting in favor of the bill were 215 Democrats and 2 Republicans. Voting against it were 208 Republicans and 5 Democrats.

The U.S. Senate has not voted on the bill, as proponents do not have the 60 votes needed to end a filibuster and pass the law.

=== 118th Congress ===
In early 2023, legislation to ban assault weapons was introduced in both the House and Senate, and was cosponsored by a large majority of Democratic legislators in both cases.

== State assault weapon bans ==
U.S. assault weapons bans by jurisdiction
| Jurisdiction | Status | By make or model | Semiauto rifles | Semiauto pistols | Shotguns | Features test | Magazine capacity |
|---|---|---|---|---|---|---|---|
| California | In force | X mark | X mark | X mark | X mark | X mark | 10 |
| Connecticut | In force | X mark | X mark | X mark | X mark | X mark | 10 |
| Delaware | In force | X mark | X mark | X mark | X mark | X mark | 17 |
| District of Columbia | In force | X mark | X mark | X mark | X mark | X mark | 10 |
| Hawaii | In force | | | X mark | | X mark | 10 (pistols) |
| Illinois | In force | X mark | X mark | X mark | X mark | X mark | 10 (15 for handguns) |
| Maryland | In force | X mark | X mark | X mark | X mark | X mark | 10 |
| Massachusetts | In force | X mark | X mark | X mark | X mark | X mark | 10 |
| New Jersey | In force | X mark | X mark | X mark | X mark | X mark | 10 |
| New York | In force | | X mark | X mark | X mark | X mark | 10 |
| Rhode Island | In force | | X mark | X mark | X mark | X mark | 10 |
| Virginia | On hold | | X mark | X mark | X mark | X mark | 15 |
| Washington | In force | X mark | X mark | X mark | X mark | X mark | 10 |

Three U.S. states passed assault weapons bans before Congress passed the federal Assault Weapons Ban of 1994: California in 1989, New Jersey in 1990, and Connecticut in 1993. Four others passed assault weapons bans before AWB 1994 expired in 2004: Hawaii, Maryland, Massachusetts and New York.

=== California ===
California restricts the possession, sale, transfer or import of defined assault weapons to those individuals who possess a Dangerous Weapons Permit issued by the California Department of Justice. In practice, very few Dangerous Weapons Permits are issued, and only under a very limited set of circumstances defined in state DOJ regulations.

==== 1989 ====
In May 1989, California became the first state in the U.S. to pass an assault weapons law, after the January 1989 Cleveland Elementary School shooting in Stockton. The Roberti-Roos Assault Weapons Control Act of 1989, or AWCA, restricted semi-automatic firearms that it classified as assault weapons: over 50 specific brands and models of rifles, pistols, and shotguns to those who were issued a Dangerous Weapons Permit by the California Department of Justice. Since the Department of Justice generally does not give Dangerous Weapons Permits to ordinary citizens, the Roberti-Roos Act amounts to an effective ban on defined assault weapons in California. It also banned magazines able to hold more than 10 rounds of ammunition. Guns and magazines legally owned at the time the law was passed were grandfathered in if registered with the California Department of Justice.

==== 1999 ====
In March 1999, State Senator Don Perata introduced Senate Bill 23 (SB 23). The bill had three provisions: to make illegal the manufacture, importation, sale or offer, or to give or lend any large-capacity magazine as defined as having the capacity to accept more than ten rounds; the addition of a "generic" definition list to the existing Roberti-Roos legislation; and the exemption to allow on and off duty and retired peace officers the use of assault weapons. They are defined in Penal Code §12276.1 and §30515. The bill was passed and went into effect on January 1, 2000.

Shortly after this was passed, a loophole was discovered. Since the law was written by make and model or the number of features, the loophole was that a detachable magazine was allowed, if it required a tool to remove. This led to the creation of the Bullet Button. The Bullet Button is a device that replaced the standard magazine catch on the rifle and prevented the magazine from being released without a small pointed device inserted into the screw hole. Various designs and other versions of Bullet Button type devices were released and used by millions of Californians.

==== 2016 ====
In December 2015, Syed Rizwan Farook and Tashfeen Malik borrowed a rifle and removed the Bullet Button, making it an illegal configuration. Then went to the San Bernardino Inland Regional Center where they murdered 14 people and injured 22 others. This led to a second, stricter version of the original California assault weapons ban SB880, AKA the Bullet Button Ban. This made previously legal configurations of semi-automatic sporting rifles illegal. The owners were given a choice to register the guns as assault weapons with the California DOJ or change the configuration.

The bill was finalized and passed, then waited for 9 months for the DOJ regulations to enable owners to start the registration process. On the last day of Kamala Harris' tenure, at 2 pm as Attorney General, the laws were updated to include new categories of assault weapons, now including shotguns. This was presented as an emergency approval because the deadline was in 3 hrs.

==== 2021 ====
On June 5, 2021, federal judge Roger Benitez overturned California's ban in his decision in Miller v. Bonta. He issued a permanent injunction against enforcement of the law but stayed it for 30 days to give state Attorney General Rob Bonta time to appeal. Benitez opened his opinion by stating that "[l]ike the Swiss Army Knife the popular AR-15 rifle is a perfect combination of home defense weapon and homeland defense equipment. Good for both home and battle, the AR-15 is the kind of versatile gun that lies at the intersection of the kinds of firearms protected under District of Columbia v. Heller, 554 U.S. 570 (2008) and United States v Miller, 307 U.S. 174 (1939)." A three-judge panel of the Ninth Circuit Court of Appeals issued a stay of Benitez's ruling on June 21, 2021, leaving the ban in place as appeals were litigated.

==== 2024 ====
Judge Benitez once again ruled that the California ban is unconstitutional after the Ninth Circuit remanded the case back down to the district in light of New York State Rifle & Pistol Association, Inc. v. Bruen. The case has since been held in abeyance pending the decision of the En Banc Court in 'Duncan v. Bonta'

=== Colorado ===
The state of Colorado does not define or restrict assault weapons. However, since August 1, 2026, Colorado has imposed additional requirements for the purchase of semiautomatic rifles and shotguns with detachable magazines, and gas-operated semiautomatic pistols with detachable magazines.

A person wishing to buy such a firearm must fill out an application on the Firearms Safety System website, which is run by the Colorado Parks and Wildlife (CPW) agency. The application must be reviewed and approved by a county sheriff, who issues an eligibility card that is valid for five years. Next the person must pass a safety course given by a verified firearms instructor, which is also valid for five years. This is a four-hour course for someone who has previously passed a Hunter Education class certified by CPW, or a twelve-hour course otherwise. After that the sale may be conducted by a federally licensed firearms dealer.

On November 4, 2026, a federal judge denied a preliminary injunction against these requirements in Del Toro v. Polis. The court found that the challengers had not shown they were substantially likely to succeed on their Second Amendment claim.

=== Connecticut ===
In June 1993, Connecticut became the third U.S. state, after California and New Jersey, to pass an assault weapons ban. In April 2013, four months after the Sandy Hook Elementary School shooting, the Connecticut General Assembly passed new restrictions on the state's existing assault weapons ban. The law was challenged, but a federal judge upheld it and ruled it constitutional. Gun owners said they would appeal.

Connecticut prohibits any person from possessing an assault weapon unless the weapon was possessed prior to July 1, 1994, and the possessor:

- Was eligible to apply for a certificate of possession for the assault weapon by July 1, 1994;
- Lawfully possessed the assault weapon prior to October 1, 1993, or inherited a defined assault weapon that was lawfully possessed prior to the aforementioned date; and
- Is not in violation of Connecticut General Statutes §§ 53-202a to 53-202k (assault weapon regulations), and Connecticut General Statutes § 53-202o (affirmative defense in prosecution for possession of specified assault weapon). It also prohibits any person from distributing, transporting, importing into the state, keeping, offering or exposing for sale, or giving an assault weapon to any person.

Connecticut defines an "assault weapon" as:

- Any "selective-fire" firearm capable of fully automatic, semi-automatic or "burst fire" at the option of the user;
- Any semi-automatic centerfire rifle, regardless of the date produced, that has the ability to accept a detachable magazine and has at least one of the following features:
  1. A folding or telescoping stock;
  2. Any grip of the weapon, including a pistol grip, thumbhole stock, or other stock, that would allow an individual to grip the weapon resulting in any finger on the trigger hand in addition to the trigger finger being directly below any portion of the action of the weapon when firing;
  3. A forward pistol grip;
  4. A flash suppressor; or
  5. A grenade or flare launcher;
- A semi-automatic pistol that has an ability to accept a detachable magazine and has at least one of the following features:
  1. The ability to accept a detachable ammunition magazine that attaches at some location outside the pistol grip;
  2. A threaded barrel capable of accepting a flash suppressor, forward pistol grip or silencer;
  3. A shroud that is attached to, or partially or completely encircles, the barrel and that permits the shooter to hold the firearm without being burned (except a slide that encloses the barrel); or
  4. A second hand grip;
- A semi-automatic shotgun that has both of the following features:
  1. A folding or telescoping stock; or
  2. Any grip of the weapon, including a pistol grip, a thumbhole stock, or any other stock, the use of which would allow an individual to grip the weapon, resulting in any finger on the trigger hand in addition to the trigger finger being directly below any portion of the action of the weapon when firing;
- A semiautomatic, centerfire rifle that has:
  1. A fixed magazine that can accept more than 10 rounds of ammunition; or
  2. An overall length of less than 30 inches;
- A semiautomatic pistol with a fixed magazine that has the ability to accept more than 10 rounds of ammunition;
- A semiautomatic shotgun that can accept a detachable magazine; or
- A shotgun with a revolving cylinder.

Connecticut also bans listed makes and models of semiautomatic firearms and copies of those firearms. Grandfather clauses and other exceptions apply, depending.

=== Delaware ===
Since June 30, 2022, the production, sale, transfer, receipt, and possession of firearms deemed as assault weapons are prohibited. State law bans numerous specifically named semi-automatic centerfire rifles, semi-automatic shotguns, and semi-automatic pistols. The law also bans "copycat" assault weapons, which are defined as being a firearm that while not specifically listed as a banned assault weapon, is either a semi-automatic centerfire rifle, semi-automatic shotgun, or semi-automatic pistol with one or more specific banned cosmetic features. Assault weapons acquired before June 20, 2022 are grandfathered in – that is, they are legal to possess, and to transfer to a family member.

=== Hawaii ===
Hawaiian law bans the manufacture, possession, sale or other transfer of what it defines as assault pistols. Hawaii defines an "assault pistol" as a semiautomatic handgun that accepts a detachable magazine and that has two or more of:

- An ammunition magazine that attaches to the pistol outside of the pistol grip;
- A threaded barrel capable of accepting a barrel extender, flash suppressor, forward hand grip, or silencer;
- A shroud that is attached to or partially or completely encircles the barrel and that permits the shooter to hold the firearm with the second hand without being burned;
- A manufactured weight of 50 ounces or more when the pistol is unloaded;
- A centerfire pistol with an overall length of 12 inches or more; or
- A semiautomatic version of an automatic firearm.

In tandem with the assault pistol ban is a law that bans the manufacture, possession, sale or other transfer of detachable ammunition magazines with capacities greater than 10 rounds that are capable of use with a pistol.

=== Illinois ===
On January 10, 2023, Illinois enacted a law making it illegal to manufacture, deliver, sell, or purchase an assault weapon. Any assault weapons that are already owned by residents are legal to possess if registered with the state police by January 1, 2024. In Illinois assault weapons include any centerfire semi-automatic rifle with a detachable magazine and one or more of these features: a pistol grip, a thumbhole stock, a folding or telescoping stock, a forward grip, a flash suppressor, or a grenade launcher. A number of other rifles, shotguns, and pistols are also defined as assault weapons, including some specific makes and models. Not considered assault weapons but similarly restricted are .50 caliber rifles.

=== Maryland ===
Maryland law prohibits the possession, sale, transfer, purchase, receipt, or transportation into the state of assault weapons defined as assault pistols and assault long guns. Maryland's definition of an "assault long gun" includes a list of 45 specific firearms or their copies, with certain variations. Maryland's definition of an "assault pistol" includes a list of 15 specific firearms or their copies, with certain variations. Maryland also defines an assault weapon "copycat weapon" as:

- A semiautomatic centerfire rifle that can accept a detachable magazine and has any two of the following: a folding stock; a grenade or flare launcher; or a flash suppressor;
- A semiauto centerfire rifle that has a fixed magazine with the capacity to accept more than 10 rounds;
- A semiauto centerfire rifle that has an overall length of less than 29 inches;
- A semiauto pistol with a fixed magazine that can accept more than 10 rounds;
- A semiauto shotgun that has a folding stock; or
- A shotgun with a revolving cylinder.

In tandem with the assault weapons ban is a law that bans the manufacture, sale or other transfer of detachable magazines with capacities greater than 20 rounds.

The United States Supreme Court refused to hear a challenge to the Maryland ban in November 2017. The U.S. Court of Appeals for the 4th Circuit in Richmond had upheld the ban, stating that: "[A]ssault weapons and large-capacity magazines are not protected by the Second Amendment." Attorneys general in 21 states and the NRA had asked the Supreme Court to hear the case.

=== Massachusetts ===
Massachusetts law bans the sale, transfer, or possession of assault weapons not otherwise lawfully possessed on September 13, 1994. Massachusetts defines "assault weapon" by the definition of "semiautomatic assault weapon" in the federal assault weapons ban of 1994. That definition included:

- A list of firearms by name and copies of those firearms;
- Semi-automatic rifles and pistols capable of accepting a detachable magazine and having at least two specified characteristics; and
- Semi-automatic shotguns having at least two specified characteristics.

In tandem with the assault weapons ban is a law that bans the sale, transfer, or possession of a large capacity feeding device unless such device was lawfully possessed on September 13, 1994. The definition of "large capacity feeding device" included: a fixed or detachable magazine, box, drum, feed strip or similar device capable of accepting, or that can be readily converted to accept, more than 10 rounds of ammunition or more than 5 shotgun shells; or a large capacity ammunition feeding device as defined in the federal assault weapons ban of 1994.

=== New Jersey ===
In May 1990, New Jersey became the second state in the U.S. to pass an assault weapons ban, after California. At the time, it was the most restrictive assault weapons ban in the nation. AR-15 semi-automatic rifles are illegal in New Jersey and owning and publicly carrying other guns require separate licensing processes.

Although it is commonly referred to as an assault weapons ban, New Jersey's law actually uses the term "assault firearm" to define banned and regulated guns. Among the list of firearms identified as 'assault firearms' are the Colt AR-15, AK variants and all 'M1 Carbine Type' variants. Some New Jersey gun advocates have called its laws "draconian". Attorney Evan Nappen, author of several books on New Jersey gun laws, says the term is "misapplied and carries with it a pejorative meaning."

Because one of the definitions of assault firearm under New Jersey law is a semiautomatic rifle with a detachable magazine and two or more additional listed features, it is possible to manufacture a rifle that is somewhat similar to an AR-15 but still legal in New Jersey, and several companies have done so. An example would be a AR-15-style rifle with a detachable magazine and a pistol grip, but without any of the other features, such as a folding or telescoping stock, a threaded barrel, or a flash suppressor. Additionally the barrel must be at least 16 inches long and the magazine capacity must not be greater than 10 rounds.

On 17 July, 2026, in a 10-5 ruling, Third Circuit Court of Appeals declared New Jersey's assault weapons ban unconstitutional. The ruling also nixed the state's ban on magazines over 10 rounds. The decision has been stayed pending appeal to the Supreme Court.

=== New York ===
New York law bans the manufacture, transport, disposal or possession of an assault weapon in the state. Assault weapons purchased and registered before the passage of the SAFE Act are grandfathered in. It defines an "assault weapon" as:

- A semi-automatic rifle or pistol able to accept a detachable magazine and that has at least one from a list of characteristics;
- A semi-automatic shotgun that has at least one from a list of characteristics; or
- A revolving cylinder shotgun.

In tandem with the assault weapons ban is a law that bans the manufacture, transport, disposal or possession of a "large capacity ammunition feeding device", defined as: "a magazine, belt, drum, feed strip, or similar device that: 1) has a capacity of, or that can be readily restored or converted to accept, more than ten rounds of ammunition; 2) contains more than seven rounds of ammunition; or 3) is obtained after January 15, 2013 and has a capacity of, or can be readily restored or converted to accept more than seven rounds of ammunition."

=== Rhode Island ===
In June 2025, an assault weapons ban was passed that took effect on July 1, 2026. It is illegal to buy, sell, import, or manufacture a firearm defined as an assault weapon. Assault weapons legally owned before July 1, 2026 are grandfathered in.

In Rhode Island, assault weapons include centerfire rifles with detachable magazines and one or more of the following features: a pistol grip, a folding or telescoping stock, a thumbhole stock, a barrel shroud, a flash suppressor, a threaded barrel, or a grenade launcher. Some handguns and shotguns are also defined as assault weapons.

=== Virginia ===
An assault weapons ban that was enacted in Virginia and originally planned to take effect on July 1, 2026 was blocked by a judge and is on hold pending further legal appeals. If the law does come into effect, it would be illegal to buy, sell, or import a firearm defined as an assault weapon. Assault weapons previously owned would remain legal to possess. Magazines that can hold more than 15 rounds would be similarly restricted.

In Virginia, assault weapons include semiautomatic centerfire rifles with detachable magazines and one or more of these features: a pistol grip; a folding, telescoping, or collapsible stock; a thumbhole stock; a forward grip; a grenade launcher; or a threaded barrel. Some handguns and shotguns are also defined as assault weapons.

=== Washington ===
On April 25, 2023, the state of Washington enacted a law prohibiting the sale, offering for sale, manufacturing, importation, or distribution of certain semi-automatic firearms that it defined as assault weapons. Assault weapons legally possessed before the ban went into effect are grandfathered in; that is, it is legal for owners to keep them. In Washington, assault weapons include any semi-automatic centerfire rifle with a detachable magazine, and at least one of these features:

- Pistol grip
- Thumbhole stock
- Folding or telescoping stock
- Forward grip
- Flash suppressor
- Muzzle brake
- Threaded barrel
- Grenade launcher
- Barrel shroud

A number of other rifles, shotguns, and pistols are also defined as assault weapons, including a list of specific makes and models.

== Local bans ==
=== District of Columbia ===
A Washington, D.C. law banning the possession of assault weapons was upheld by a federal appeals court in 2011.

=== Illinois ===
The law that set up Illinois' concealed carry system in 2013 also established state preemption for certain areas of gun law, including restrictions on assault weapons. Laws passed before July 20, 2013, are grandfathered in, and a number of local governments in the Chicago area have laws that either prohibit or regulate the possession of firearms that they define as assault weapons. These include the city of Chicago and Cook County. On December 7, 2015, the Supreme Court of the United States refused to grant a writ of certiorari to take up a challenge brought against a decision by the U.S. Court of Appeals for the Seventh Circuit which had upheld a local law banning assault weapons and "magazines that could hold more than 10 rounds of ammunition" in the Chicago suburb of Highland Park, Illinois. In refusing to hear the case, the Supreme Court allowed the ruling to stand and the ban to remain in place.

=== Indiana ===
In March 1989, the Northwest Indiana cities of Gary and East Chicago city councils passed ordinances prohibiting both sale and possession of assault weapons. Gary City Councilman Vernon G. Smith (D-4th) sponsored the ordinance making it a crime to possess or sell assault-type weapons. Both of these ordinances were invalidated under statewide pre-emption legislation enacted by the Indiana General Assembly and signed into law by Governor Mitch Daniels in 2011.

In July 2023, the Indianapolis City-County Council passed an assault weapons ban trigger law, which can only go into effect once the Indiana state preemption law is repealed or invalidated.

=== Massachusetts ===
Boston has a law prohibiting the possession or transfer of assault weapons without a license from the Boston Police Commissioner.

== 2026 federal appellate decisions and Supreme Court review ==
In July 2026, the United States Court of Appeals for the Third Circuit struck down New Jersey's ban on assault firearms and its restrictions on large capacity magazines. The court held that the challenged restrictions violated the Second Amendment to the United States Constitution. The decision marked the first time that a federal circuit court had invalidated a state assault weapons ban on Second Amendment grounds. The ruling also created a significant conflict with decisions from other federal appellate courts that had upheld similar restrictions.

The Third Circuit's decision came shortly after the Supreme Court of the United States agreed to hear challenges to laws in Cook County, Illinois and in Connecticut that restrict AR-15 platform and similar semiautomatic rifles. On June 30, 2026 the Court granted certiorari in Viramontes v. Cook County. It consolidated that case with Grant v. Higgins, the Connecticut challenge, for one hour of oral argument. The question before the Court is whether the Second and Fourteenth Amendments guarantee the right to possess AR-15 platform and similar semiautomatic rifles. Oral Argument is set for December 2, 2026.

== Public opinion ==
Shortly after the 2016 Orlando nightclub shooting, a CBS News poll found that a majority of Americans (57%) supported a ban on assault weapons. Gallup noted a similarly high percentage of Americans thought that a ban would be an effective response to terrorism after the 2015 San Bernardino attack (55%), and in 2013 when the question was put in a referendum format ("Would you vote for or against a law that would reinstate and strengthen the ban on assault weapons that was in place from 1994 to 2004?") (56% support). But it noted that "Support for stricter gun control laws often rises after high-profile shooting incidents and then often subsides again," and that support for stricter gun controls, although still a majority view, had declined since the early 1990s. By October 2016, support for an assault weapons ban had fallen to a historical low of 36%.

In 2017, 68% of American adults supported banning assault weapons, including 48% of gun owners and 77% of non-gun owners, and 38% of Republicans who own guns and 66% of Democrats who own guns, according to a Pew Research Center survey with an error attributable to sampling of +/- 2.8% at the 95% level of confidence. In 2018, most Americans who were polled, supported a ban on assault weapons.

A Quinnipiac University poll taken after the 2023 Michigan State University shooting found that 48% of Americans opposed a ban on assault weapons, while 47% supported a ban on assault weapons. Support for a ban fell five points since the previous Quinnipiac poll in April 2021, showing a decline in support for banning sales of assault weapons despite a series of high-profile mass shootings driving increased support for new gun restrictions.

In April 2023, a Fox News poll found that 61% of Americans were in favor of an assault weapon ban. 84% of Democrats and 34% of Republicans were in favor.
