= Faiths United to Prevent Gun Violence =

US gun control advocacy organization

- Founded: January 17, 2011
- Location: Washington, D.C.
- Region served: United States
- Members: 50
- Affiliations: Brady Campaign to Prevent Gun Violence
- Employees: 1
- Website: faiths-united.org

Faiths United to Prevent Gun Violence (Faiths United) is a United States faith-based, interdenominational gun control advocacy organization.

== History ==
Faiths United to Prevent Gun Violence was formed on January 17, 2011, after the 2011 Tucson shooting that killed six and injured U.S. Rep. Gabby Giffords. The coalition's 24 founding members wrote a letter to Congress endorsing a bill to ban "magazines [which] can hold 30, 50, or even 100 rounds." The bill, H.R. 308, did not pass.

In 2012, Faiths United worked with the Brady Campaign to Prevent Gun Violence, the Coalition to Stop Gun Violence, and other gun control groups to prevent passage of the National Right to Carry Reciprocity Act.

In January 2013, Faiths United and other faith leaders wrote another letter to Congress after the Sandy Hook Elementary School shooting in Newtown, Connecticut. In March 2013, it collaborated with the National Cathedral, PICO National Network, and Mayors Against Illegal Guns to urge new gun laws requiring background checks for all gun sales, banning assault weapons and magazines holding certain numbers of rounds, in addition to making gun trafficking a federal crime.

== Membership and mission ==
As of May 2013, Faiths United to Prevent Gun Violence listed 50 supporters, including Jewish, Christian, Islamic, and Sikh groups. It advocates that: every person who buys a gun should pass a criminal background check; high-capacity weapons and ammunition magazines should not be available to civilians; and gun trafficking should be a federal crime. Its national coordinator, Vincent DeMarco, has said that he believes the same grass-roots, faith-based strategy that beat the tobacco lobby can also defeat the gun lobby.
