= Coalition to Stop Gun Violence =

Organization

- Merged into: Johns Hopkins Center for Gun Violence Solutions
- Formation: 1974
- Dissolved: 2022
- Headquarters: Washington, D.C.
- Members: 48 organizations
- Website: www.csgv.org

The Coalition to Stop Gun Violence (CSGV) and the Educational Fund to Stop Gun Violence (EFSGV or Ed Fund), its sister organization, were two parts of a national, non-profit gun control advocacy organization opposed to gun violence. Since 1974, it supported reduction in American gun violence via education and legislation. They ceased operations in 2022 after the EFSGV merged with the Johns Hopkins Center for Gun Violence Prevention and Policy to become the Johns Hopkins Center for Gun Violence Solutions.

== History ==
In 1974, the United Methodist General Board of Church and Society formed the National Coalition to Ban Handguns, a group of thirty affiliated religious, labor, and nonprofit organizations, with the goal of addressing "the high rates of gun-related crime and death in American society" by requiring licensing of gun owners, registering firearms, and banning private ownership of handguns. "Reasonable limited exceptions" were to be allowed for "police, military, licensed security guards, antique dealers who have guns in unfireable condition, and licensed pistol clubs where firearms are kept on the premises." In the 1980s and 1990s, the coalition expanded to 44 member groups.

In 1989, following the Cleveland Elementary School shooting in Stockton, California, the National Coalition to Ban Handguns changed its name to the Coalition to Stop Gun Violence, in part because the group believed that assault weapons as well as handguns, should be outlawed.

In 2022, the EFSGV merged with the Johns Hopkins Center for Gun Violence Prevention and Policy to become the Johns Hopkins Center for Gun Violence Solutions.

== Mission ==
According to CSGV, its mission was: "We believe that all Americans have a right to live in communities free from gun violence. We pursue this goal through policy development, strategic engagement, and effective advocacy." The organization had nine areas of focus, regarding issues and campaigns:

1. Opposition to the National Rifle Association's interpretation of Second Amendment rights.
2. Support for firearm microstamping, a ballistic identification technology intended to allow law enforcement to trace the serial number of a firearm from ejected cartridge cases recovered from crime scenes.
3. Ban the private sale of guns by instituting universal background checks.
4. Ban concealed carry.
5. Opposition to the sale of what it classifies as assault weapons to private citizens.
6. Support for "countermarketing", a strategy intended to force changes in gun industry's marketing and distribution practices.
7. Opposition to removing the duty to retreat in self-defense law (i.e., stand your ground laws).
8. Support for stricter mental health screening for firearm purchases.
9. Support for the repeal of the Protection of Lawful Commerce in Arms Act.

== Former leadership ==
- Joshua Horwitz was the Executive Director of CSGV/EFSGV. He is an attorney who joined the Education Fund in 1989 as Legal Director.
- Michael K. Beard was the founding President of the CSGV/EFSGV.

== Membership ==
CSGV consisted of 47 organizations in March 2016. Among them were religious organizations, child welfare advocacy groups, public health professionals, social justice, and political action organizations.

The member groups were:

- American Academy of Pediatrics
- American Association of Suicidology
- American Ethical Union
- American Jewish Committee
- American Jewish Congress
- American Psychiatric Association
- American Public Health Association
- Americans for Democratic Action
- Association of Japanese Families of Gun Violence Victims in the U. S. A.
- Baptist Peace Fellowship of North America
- The Bible Holiness Movement, International
- Center for Science in the Public Interest
- Central Conference of American Rabbis
- Children's Defense Fund
- Child Welfare League of America, Inc.
- Church of the Brethren
- The Communitarian Network
- The Council of The Great City Schools
- DC for Democracy
- The DISARM Education Fund
- Fellowship of Reconciliation
- Friends Committee on National Legislation
- Jesuit Conference – Office of Social Ministries
- Jewish Community Center Association
- Jewish Women International
- Loretto Community
- National Association of School Psychologists
- National Association of Social Workers
- National Council of Jewish Women
- National Council of Negro Women
- National Urban League
- North American Federation of Temple Youth
- Pan American Trauma Association
- Peace Action of Washington
- Presbyterian Church (U.S.A.)
- Union for Reform Judaism
- Unitarian Universalist Association
- UNITE HERE
- United Church of Christ
- United Federation of Teachers
- United Methodist Church Board of Church & Society
- United States Conference of Mayors
- United States Student Association
- United Synagogue of Conservative Judaism
- Woman's National Democratic Club
- Women's League for Conservative Judaism
- YWCA of U. S. A.
