= Josh Sugarmann =

American gun control activist

Josh Sugarmann is an American gun control activist and researcher of gun violence in the United States. Sugarmann is the founder and executive director of the Violence Policy Center (VPC), a non-profit advocacy and educational organization. He is the author of two books on gun control and gun violence, and has written a blog on these issues for the Huffington Post.

== Early life and education ==
Sugarmann grew up in Newtown, Connecticut, graduating in the high school class of 1978. He graduated from Boston University with a degree in journalism.

== Career ==
After college, Sugarmann moved to Washington, D.C., where he became engaged in public interest activities. After serving as a press officer in the national office of Amnesty International USA he became the director of communications for the National Coalition to Ban Handguns (now known as the Coalition to Stop Gun Violence).

In 1988 Sugarmann founded the Violence Policy Center, a 501(c3) gun control advocacy and educational group based in Washington, D.C. The Violence Policy Center is known mainly for its in-depth research on the firearms industry, the causes and effects of gun violence, and recommendations for regulatory policies to reduce gun violence.

Sugarmann has opposed the widespread availability of semi-automatic rifles. In 1988 he published a study titled Assault Weapons and Accessories in America. It examined the growing popularity of semiautomatic firearms, referring to them as "assault weapons". Together with the response to a mass shooting in Stockton, California the following year, his study has been credited for popularizing the use of the term "assault weapons." The study documents advertising by the gun industry that specifically refers to these weapons as assault rifles.

Sugarmann believes a full ban on handguns is necessary. He has also called for bans on semi-automatic rifles and firearm magazines with a capacity of more than 10 rounds. He maintains a Class One Federal Firearms License in Washington, D.C., which makes it legal for him to transfer and handle firearms.

== Books ==
Sugarmann has written two books on gun control and gun violence. The first, National Rifle Association: Money, Firepower & Fear (1992), was an exposé of the National Rifle Association of America. The second, Every Handgun is Aimed at You: The Case for Banning Handguns (2000), gives reasons to ban private possession of handguns in the United States.
