= Tom Diaz =

American activist

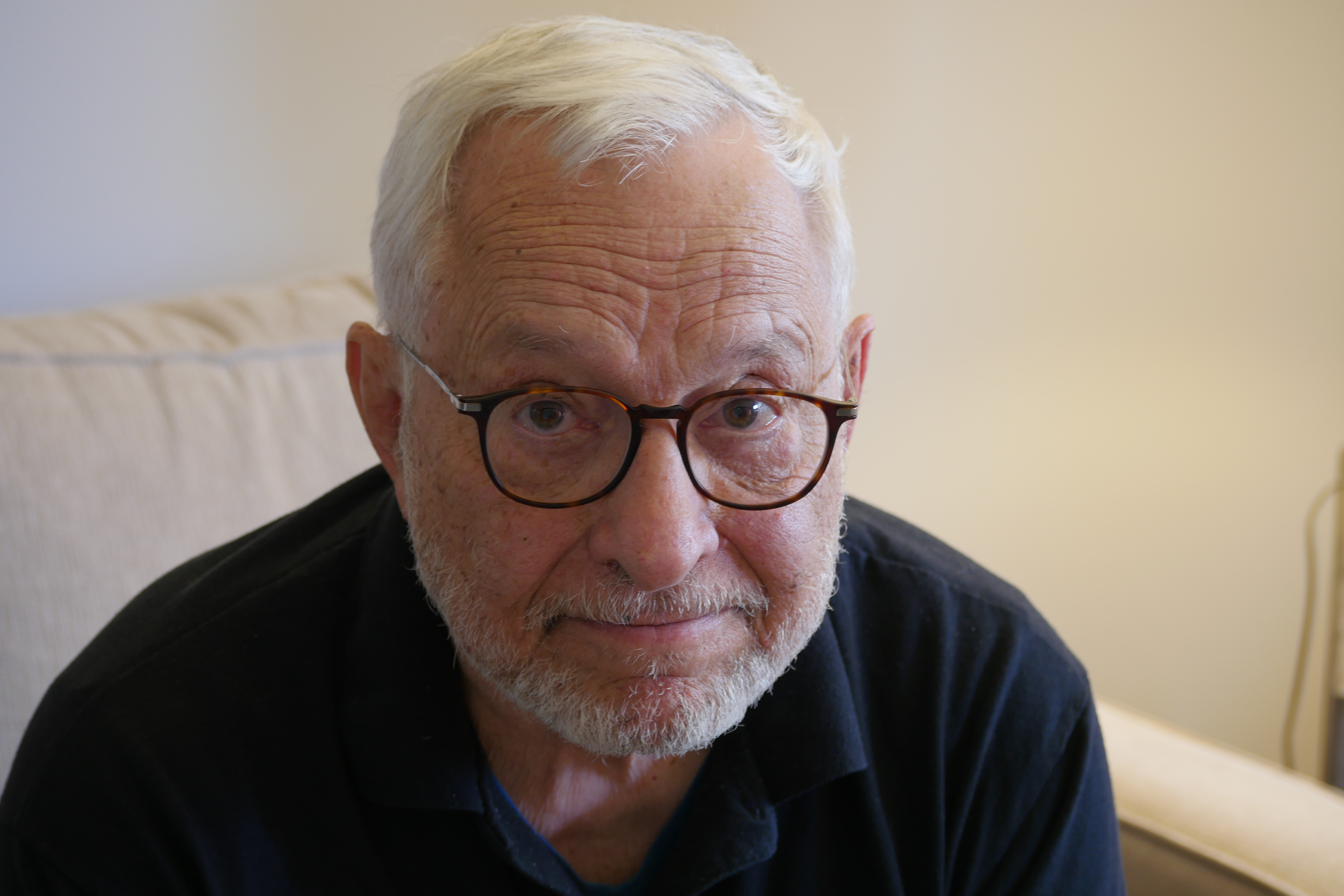
- Tom Diaz in 2021
- Born: July 1940 (age 86); Fort Oglethorpe, Georgia, US
- Education: Lakeland Senior High School (Florida); Naval Academy Preparatory School; United States Air Force Academy (non graduate); University of Florida; Georgetown University Law Center
- Occupation: Writer; Lawyer; Public speaker; Newspaper reporter and editor; Congressional staff attorney; Senior policy analyst at the Violence Policy Center
- Years active: 1972-present
- Known for: Expertise on guns, gun violence reduction, criminal gangs, and terrorism

Tom Diaz is an American writer, lawyer, journalist, and public speaker. He has written books and journal articles about the American gun industry, gun violence reduction, international terrorism, and transnational Latino gangs. He was formerly senior policy analyst at the Violence Policy Center and is one of the more prominent advocates for a strict system of federal gun control in the United States.

== Biography ==
Tom Diaz is a graduate of the University of Florida with a degree in political science and the Georgetown University Law Center, where he was an editor of the Law Journal. He is now retired but practiced law in both private and government practice, beginning in 1972. He was a small arms specialist in the Air National Guard, and was a competitive shooter, gun enthusiast and NRA member until while working as a Congressional staff lawyer in the early 1990s he interviewed victims of gun violence, and concluded that reasonable limits should be placed on the availability of military style weapons that the gun industry was then beginning to aggressively market.

Mr. Diaz was counsel to the Congressional House Subcommittee on Crime and Criminal Justice from August 1993 to January 1997. During that time, he was the lead Democratic counsel in the House on firearms and terrorism, but worked on a range of other issues.

Diaz was assistant managing editor of The Washington Times newspaper from 1985 to 1991. From 1991 to 1993 he worked at the National Strategy Information Center, a nonpartisan think tank specializing in international organized crime and counter-terrorism. From 1993 to 1997 he was the lead Democratic counsel on counterterrorism and firearms issues for the Crime Subcommittee of the U.S. House of representatives, helping to conduct fact-finding hearings and write key antiterrorism and gun control legislation. He was also the lead Democratic counsel during 10 days of intensive House hearings in 1995 on the events at the Branch Davidian church in Waco, Texas in 1993.

== Views ==
Diaz has written numerous monographs on the proliferation of firearms in the United States and on the impact of the easy availability of specific classes of firearms on gun crime, death and injury in the United States. He has appeared on numerous television and radio media outlets, has been written about and quoted in print media, and his op-eds have been widely published.

He has charged that the gun industry uses claims of increased lethality to increase sales. David Corn wrote:

In his book Making a Killing: The Business of Guns in America, Tom Diaz, a former NRA member and competitive shooter who became a gun control activist, shows that the gun industry in recent years responded to flat sales by producing increasingly deadly guns. But the gun culture—centered on a device that enables lethal violence — is not part of the right’s "culture of death."

He has also pointed to the way the NRA and gun industry use violent movies and images of death to promote firearms, claiming that the NRA's National Firearms Museum exhibits weapons used in notorious on-screen murders. He claims the NRA promoted concealed carry laws to help sell additional smaller firearms to people.

He has been the backing behind the campaign to ban rifles chambered in .50 BMG.

Diaz is known for his public policy stances that eschew the incremental political approach taken by others in the gun control community, such as Americans for Gun Safety and the American Hunters and Shooters Association. For example, Diaz openly stated that the 1994 Federal Assault Weapons Ban would not have any impact on violent crime statistics and that it only affected cosmetic features on semi-automatic firearms.

== Works ==
- Making a Killing: The Business of Guns in America (1999)
- Lighting Out of Lebanon: Hezbollah Terrorists on American Soil (2006)
- No Boundaries: Transnational Latino Gangs and American Law Enforcement (2011). About the rise of American street gangs, notably MS-13 and the 18th Street gang
- The Last Gun: How Changes in the Gun Industry Are Killing Americans and What It Will Take to Stop It (2013)
