= Terry carbine =

- Type: Carbine
- Place of origin: United States

Production history
- Designer: Ray Wilkinson
- Designed: 1970
- Manufacturer: Wilkinson Arms
- Produced: 1970—1998 (Wilkinson Arms), 2000—2005 (Northwest Arms), 2015-current (Patrick McFarland under the original Wilkinson Arms name),

Specifications
- Length: 28 ^{3/4}"
- Barrel length: 16 ^{3/16}"
- Cartridge: 9×19mm Parabellum
- Action: Blowback, closed bolt
- Feed system: 18- and 31-round detachable box magazines

The Wilkinson Terry carbine is a semi-automatic, blow-back operated, carbine chambered in 9×19mm Parabellum. It was manufactured by Wilkinson Arms from 1970 to 1998. It featured a cone-shaped flash hider and either wood or synthetic furniture. After the designer, Ray Wilkinson, died, a new company, Northwest Arms, produced the carbine from 2000 to 2005. Some of the Northwest Arms carbines were marked Linda instead of Terry. An updated version of the carbine is now manufactured as the LE-3 carbine. Most 21st century production versions feature a barrel shroud that runs from the barrel nut to the muzzle.

In 2015, Patrick McFarland purchased the Linda tooling, parts and rights and resurrected the company under the original name, Wilkinson Arms, to honor the original inventor.
