= Jesuit Conference =

Catholic administrative groupings

Jesuit Conferences are groupings of administrative divisions (Provinces and Regions) of the Society of Jesus. These Provinces and Regions are organized into a conference to promote common goals and oversee international projects. A Conference connects Jesuits across the region for mutual solidarity and corporate international initiatives, and facilitates appropriate engagement in regional needs, and greater cooperation and support among its members. A Conference provides liaison staffing in the provinces, in various national associations, and at the Society’s international headquarters in Rome. A president, appointed by the Superior General, oversees the work of the Jesuit Conference.

== Administration ==
For administrative reasons the members of the Society of Jesus are divided into territorial Provinces or Regions. The Jesuit vocation is universal, which means that their calling is not restricted to a particular geographic area, or field of apostolic activity.

For better cooperation and apostolic efficacy, the Jesuit provinces and regions are grouped into conferences that have, by and large, a continental dimension.

== List of Jesuit Conferences ==
The six Jesuit Conferences are:

=== Jesuit Conference of Canada and the United States (JCCUS) ===
The Jesuit Conference of Canada and the United States groups together the Jesuits of 5 provinces. It is an association of the five provincial superiors of the Society of Jesus in Canada and the United States. The Conference includes the Jesuit provinces in both countries: one in Canada, and four in the United States: USA East, USA Central and Southern, USA Midwest, and USA West Provinces. The Jesuits in Haiti and Micronesia belong to the Canada Province and USA East Province, respectively.

=== Conference of Jesuit Provincials in Latin America and the Caribbean (CJLAC) ===
The Conference of Jesuit Provincials in Latin America and the Caribbean (CPAL) gathers the Jesuits of 12 provinces and 4 Regions of Latin America and the Caribbean. It is the collaborating body of the 12 provincial superiors and 4 regional superiors of the Society of Jesus in Latin America and the Caribbean. The Conference includes the following Jesuit provinces and region: Antilles Province, Argentina-Uruguay Province, Bolivia Province, Brazil Province Central America Province, Chile Province, Colombia Province, Ecuador Province, Mexico Province, Paraguay Province, Peru Province and Venezuela Province

=== Jesuit Conference of European Provincials (JCEP) ===
Jesuit Conference of European Provincials (JCEP) gathers the Jesuits of 16 provinces and 3 regions of Europe and the Near East. It is the collaborating body of the 16 provincial superiors and 3 regional superiors of the Society of Jesus in Europe and the Middle East. The Conference includes the following Jesuit provinces: British Province, European Low Countries Province, French West Europe Province, Ireland Province, Near East Province, Bohemia Province, Central European Province, Croatian Province, Hungary Province, North Poland Province, South Poland Province, Slovakia Province, Slovenia Province, Spain Province, Euro-Mediterranean Province, Portugal Province and the Jesuit regions: Romania, Russia and Guyana. The Conference's office is in Brussels.

=== Jesuit Conference of Africa and Madagascar (JCAM) ===
The Jesuit Conference of Africa and Madagascar (JCAM) gathers the Jesuits of 6 provinces and 1 region of sub-Saharan Africa and Madagascar. It is the collaborating body of the 6 provincial superiors and 1 regional superior of the Society of Jesus in sub-Saharan Africa and Madagascar. The Conference includes the following Jesuit provinces: Central Africa Province, North-West Africa Province, West African Province, Eastern Africa Province, Southern Africa Province, Madagascar Province and the Rwanda-Burundi Région.

=== Jesuit Conference of Asia Pacific (JCAP) ===
The Jesuit Conference of Asia Pacific (JCAP) gathers the Jesuits of 7 provinces, 4 regions and 2 missions of East Asia and Oceania. It is the collaborating body of the 7 provincial superiors and 4 regional superiors of the Society of Jesus in East Asia and Oceania. The Conference includes the Jesuit provinces in the countries of Australia, China, Indonesia, Japan, Korea, Philippines and Vietnam; the Jesuit regions in Malaysia-Singapore, Thailand, Timor-Leste and Myanmar, and mission territories in Cambodia and Pakistan.

The Jesuit Conference of Asia Pacific covers the life and service of the Society of Jesus in 15 countries {Australia, China, Taiwan, Indonesia, Japan, Korea, Philippines, Vietnam, Malaysia, Singapore, Myanmar, Thailand, Timor Leste, Cambodia, Laos and Pakistan} in Asia and the Pacific. The Jesuit Conference serves to bring an international perspective to and on local initiatives

=== Jesuit Conference of South Asia (JCSA) ===
The Jesuit Conference of South Asia (JCSA) gathers the Jesuits of 19 provinces, 2 regions and of South Asia (Bangladesh, India, Nepal, Pakistan, Sri Lanka). It is the collaborating body of the 19 provincial superiors and 2 regional superiors of the Society of Jesus in South Asia. The Conference includes the following Jesuit provinces: Andhra, Bombay, Calcutta, Chennai, Darjeeling, Delhi, Dumka-Raiganj, Goa, Gujarat, Hazaribagh, Jamshedpur, Karnataka, Kerala, Madhya-Pradesh, Madurai, Patna, Pune, Ranchi, Sri Lanka; Jesuit regions: Kohima and Nepal and Jesuit missions in Afghanistan, Bangladesh, Bhutan and Pakistan.

== See also ==
- Superior General of the Society of Jesus
