= Assault weapon =

Terminology used in United States firearm legislation

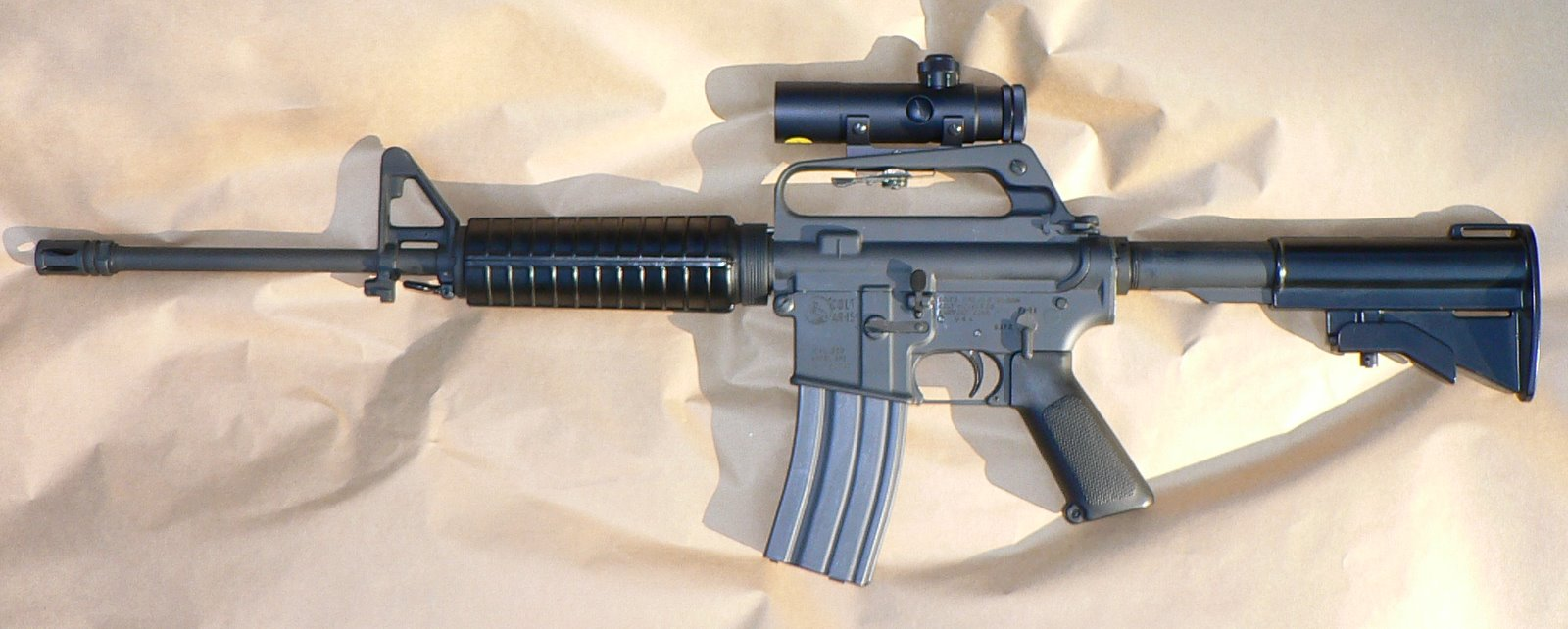
The Colt AR-15 carbine is a semi-automatic rifle – that is, it fires one round each time the trigger is pulled – chambered for centerfire ammunition. Like most rifles defined as assault weapons, it has a detachable magazine and a pistol grip. This model also has a flash suppressor and an adjustable stock.

In the United States, assault weapon is a controversial term often applied to different kinds of firearms, though its use varies and there is no clear, consistent definition. It can include semi-automatic firearms with a detachable magazine, a pistol grip, and sometimes other features, such as a vertical forward grip, flash suppressor, or barrel shroud. Certain firearms are specified by name in some laws that restrict assault weapons. When the now-defunct Federal Assault Weapons Ban was passed in 1994, the U.S. Department of Justice said, "In general, assault weapons are semiautomatic firearms with a large magazine of ammunition that were designed and configured for rapid fire and combat use." The commonly used definitions of assault weapons are under frequent debate, and have changed over time.

The origin of the term has been attributed to legislators, the firearms industry, gun control groups, and the media. It is sometimes used interchangeably with the term assault rifle, which refers to selective fire rifles that use intermediate cartridges. This use has been described as incorrect and a misapplication of the term. After the December 2012 Sandy Hook Elementary School shooting, many news organizations ran stories about assault weapons, explaining their varying definitions and presenting varying opinions about whether they should be banned again at the federal level.

== Definitions and usage ==
Drawing from federal and state law definitions, the term assault weapon refers primarily to semi-automatic rifles, pistols, and shotguns that are able to accept detachable magazines and possess one or more other features. Some jurisdictions define revolving-cylinder shotguns as assault weapons. Legislative definitions do not include fully automatic weapons, which are regulated separately as Title II weapons under federal law. (Note: Title II weapons are heavily regulated by the National Firearms Act (NFA) of June 26, 1934, passed in response to infamous Prohibition era use of Thompson submachine guns and M1918 Browning Automatic Rifles.) A key defining law was the now-defunct Federal Assault Weapons Ban of 1994. At that time, the United States Department of Justice said, "In general, assault weapons are semiautomatic firearms with a large magazine of ammunition that were designed and configured for rapid fire and combat use."

Common attributes used in legislative definitions of assault weapons include:

- Semi-automatic firearm capable of accepting a detachable magazine;
- Folding or telescoping (collapsible) stock, which reduces the overall length of the firearm;
- A pistol grip that protrudes beneath the action of the weapon;
- Bayonet lug, which allows the mounting of a bayonet;
- Threaded barrel, which can accept muzzle devices such as a flash hider, suppressor, compensator or muzzle brake;
- Grenade launcher;
- Barrel shroud.

Dictionary definitions vary from legal definitions. Dictionary.com defines "assault weapon" as "any of various automatic and semiautomatic military firearms utilizing an intermediate-power cartridge, designed for individual use". The Merriam-Webster Online Dictionary's definition is "any of various automatic or semiautomatic firearms; especially: assault rifle".

=== History of terminology ===
The origin of the term is not clearly known and is the subject of much debate. In the past, the names of certain military weapons used the phrase, such as the Rifleman's Assault Weapon, a grenade launcher developed in 1977 for use with the M16 assault rifle, or the Shoulder-launched Multipurpose Assault Weapon, a rocket launcher introduced in 1984.

One of the earliest uses of the term, or a similar term, in its current meaning was as part of an advertisement in The Hutchinson News (Kansas) in 1978 for the Valmets-7.62×39, the Colt AR-15, and the Wilkinson Terry carbine. Another was in a bill introduced by Art Agnos in the California State Assembly in April 1985 to ban semi-automatic "assault firearms" capable of using detachable magazines of 20 rounds or more. Speaking to the Assembly Public Safety Committee, Agnos said, "The only use for assault weapons is to shoot people." The measure did not pass when it came up for a vote.

In 2013, The Washington Post, looking into the history of the term, wrote of the term: "Many attribute its popularization to a 1988 paper written by gun-control activist and Violence Policy Center founder Josh Sugarmann and the later reaction to the Cleveland School massacre in Stockton, California, in January 1989." Sugarmann had written:

Assault weapons—just like armor-piercing bullets, machine guns, and plastic firearms—are a new topic. The weapons' menacing looks, coupled with the public's confusion over fully automatic machine guns versus semi-automatic assault weapons—anything that looks like a machine gun is assumed to be a machine gun—can only increase the chance of public support for restrictions on these weapons. In addition, few people can envision a practical use for these weapons.

Other researchers have found evidence to suggest that the firearms industry itself may have introduced the term "assault weapon" to build interest in new product lines. Phillip Peterson, the author of Gun Digest Buyer's Guide to Assault Weapons (2008) wrote:

The popularly held idea that the term 'assault weapon' originated with anti-gun activists is wrong. The term was first adopted by manufacturers, wholesalers, importers and dealers in the American firearms industry to stimulate sales of certain firearms that did not have an appearance that was familiar to many firearms owners. The manufacturers and gun writers of the day needed a catchy name to identify this new type of gun.

Meanwhile, many gun rights activists have put forward that the term was popularized by the media or gun control activists. Conservative writer Rich Lowry said that assault weapon is a "manufactured term". Joseph P. Tartaro of the Second Amendment Foundation (SAF) wrote in 1994: "One of the key elements of the anti-gun strategy to gull the public into supporting bans on the so-called 'assault weapons' is to foster confusion. As stated previously, the public does not know the difference between a full automatic and a semi-automatic firearm." Robert Crook, executive director of the Coalition of Connecticut Sportsmen, said "the term 'assault weapon,' as used by the media, is a media invention." What gets defined as assault weapon is often up for debate sometimes putting the term itself in question or giving it the charge of being controversial. Gun control supporters use the term while gun rights supporters and advocacy groups like The Firearm Industry Trade Association characterize weapons of this category as "so called assault weapons".

=== Differing state law definitions ===
Seven states have assault weapon bans with different definitions and characteristics.

- California defines assault weapons by name, by "series" (AK-47 or AR-15), and by characteristic. A shotgun with a revolving cylinder is also defined as an assault weapon.
- Connecticut defines assault weapons as selective-fire firearms (including assault rifles capable of fully automatic or burst fire); semi-automatic firearms specified by name; and semi-automatic firearms with specific characteristics.
- Hawaii defines and bans assault pistols. (Note: United States firearms expert Robert E. Walker says the term "assault pistol" is difficult to define and may be based on perceived "paramilitary or nonsporting application, appearance, or configuration.")
- Maryland defines and bans assault pistols. It regulates 45 other assault weapons listed by make or model including copies, regardless of manufacturer.
- Massachusetts defines assault weapons as semi-automatic firearms with the same definition provisions from the expired federal ban of 1994.
- New York had an assault weapons ban prior to 2013, but on January 16 of that year it passed the SAFE Act, which created a stricter definition of assault weapons and banned them immediately. The NY SAFE Act defines assault weapons as semi-automatic pistols and rifles with detachable magazines and one military-style feature, and semi-automatic shotguns with one military-style feature.

In Illinois, proposed legislation in 2013 would have defined the term "semi-automatic assault weapon" as any semi-automatic firearm able to accept a detachable magazine, but it was never brought to a vote. The Illinois State Rifle Association said most of the state's firearms owners owned one or more guns that would have been banned under the proposal. The NRA said the proposal would have restricted about 75 percent of handguns and 50 percent of long guns in circulation. As municipalities, Chicago and Cook County bans certain firearms defined as assault weapons and have no provision for legal possession of firearms owned before their laws were passed. Certiorari was granted in the case Viramontes v. Cook County before the Supreme Court of the United States on June 30, 2026 to decide whether the Second and Fourteenth Amendments protect the right to possess AR-15-platform and similar semiautomatic rifles. Minnesota also defines certain firearms as assault weapons and regulates their sales. The State of Washington defines any semi-automatic rifle (except antiques), regardless of features, caliber, or magazine type, as a "semiautomatic assault rifle".

=== Distinction from assault rifles ===
The term "assault rifle" is frequently used interchangeably with the term "assault weapon" but this use has been described as incorrect and a misapplication of the term. The AP Stylebook suggests that newsrooms avoid the terms "assault weapon" and "assault rifle" instead using the term "semi-automatic rifle". Part of the definition of "assault rifle", according to the Encyclopædia Britannica, is that it is selective-fire, which means that it is capable of both semiautomatic and fully automatic fire. Civilian ownership of machine guns, including selective-fire rifles, has been tightly regulated since 1934 under the National Firearms Act and since 1986 under the Firearm Owners Protection Act.

=== Cosmetic features ===
Gun control advocates and gun rights advocates have referred to at least some of the features outlined in assault weapons bans as "cosmetic". The NRA Institute for Legislative Action and the Violence Policy Center both used the term in 2004 when the federal ban expired. In May 2012, the Law Center to Prevent Gun Violence said, "the inclusion in the list of features that were purely cosmetic in nature created a loophole that allowed manufacturers to successfully circumvent the law by making minor modifications to the weapons they already produced." Some reporters used the term in stories after the 2012 shootings in Aurora, Colorado, and Newtown, Connecticut.

Assault weapons, also sometimes called "black guns" or "black rifles", are no more powerful than many other semi-automatic rifles legally used for hunting throughout the United States; they do not shoot faster or have greater range.

Two scholars have written: "One problem inherent in the study of [assault weapons (AW)] is that the classifications of AW are based on cosmetic features of firearms... For instance, the Colt AR-15 series of semi-automatic rifles—the civilian version of the fully automatic M-16 rifle issued to U.S. soldiers—was subject to the 1994 AW restrictions, but the Ruger Mini-14 rifle was not banned. Yet, the Mini-14 is the same caliber, has a similar barrel length, the same semi-automatic action, and can use magazines that hold 30 rounds of ammunition. The only real meaningful difference between the two firearms is cosmetic: The AR-15 rifle looks more dangerous."

The National Shooting Sports Foundation, a firearms industry trade group, states that the term assault weapon has been misapplied to many semi-automatic firearms because of their appearance and not their use in crime.

== Political and legislative issues ==
U.S. states and territories that have enacted assault weapons bans Long guns and handguns Handguns only

As of 2021, there are an estimated 16–44 million rifles from just the AR-15 family of rifles in civilian use in the United States.

=== Defunct U.S. Federal Assault Weapons Ban ===
The Public Safety and Recreational Firearms Use Protection Act of 1994, more commonly known as the Federal Assault Weapons Ban, expired in 2004. It banned the manufacture or importation of certain semi-automatic firearms that it defined as "semiautomatic assault weapons", commonly known as assault weapons. Any firearms so defined that were already possessed at the time the law took effect were grandfathered in, and could be legally owned or transferred. Another aspect of the law banned the manufacture or importation of magazines that could hold more than ten rounds of ammunition, with existing magazines grandfathered in as legal.

The Federal Assault Weapons Ban of 1994 defined certain firearms as assault weapons based on the features they possessed. This included semi-automatic rifles with a detachable magazine and at least two of these features: a pistol grip, a folding or telescoping stock, a flash suppressor or threaded barrel, a bayonet mount, or a muzzle-mounted grenade launcher. It included semi-automatic pistols with a detachable magazine and at least two of these features: a magazine that attaches outside the pistol grip, a threaded barrel, a barrel shroud, or an unloaded weight of 50 ounces or more. Additionally defined as assault weapons were semi-automatic shotguns with a rotating cylinder, or with at least two of these features: a pistol grip, a folding or telescoping stock, a detachable magazine, or a fixed magazine that can hold more than five rounds.

The ban also prohibited 19 specifically named models of firearms, as well as copies of those guns. These included the AK-47, Uzi, Galil, AR-15, FN FAL, MAC-10, Steyr AUG, TEC-9, and Armsel Striker.

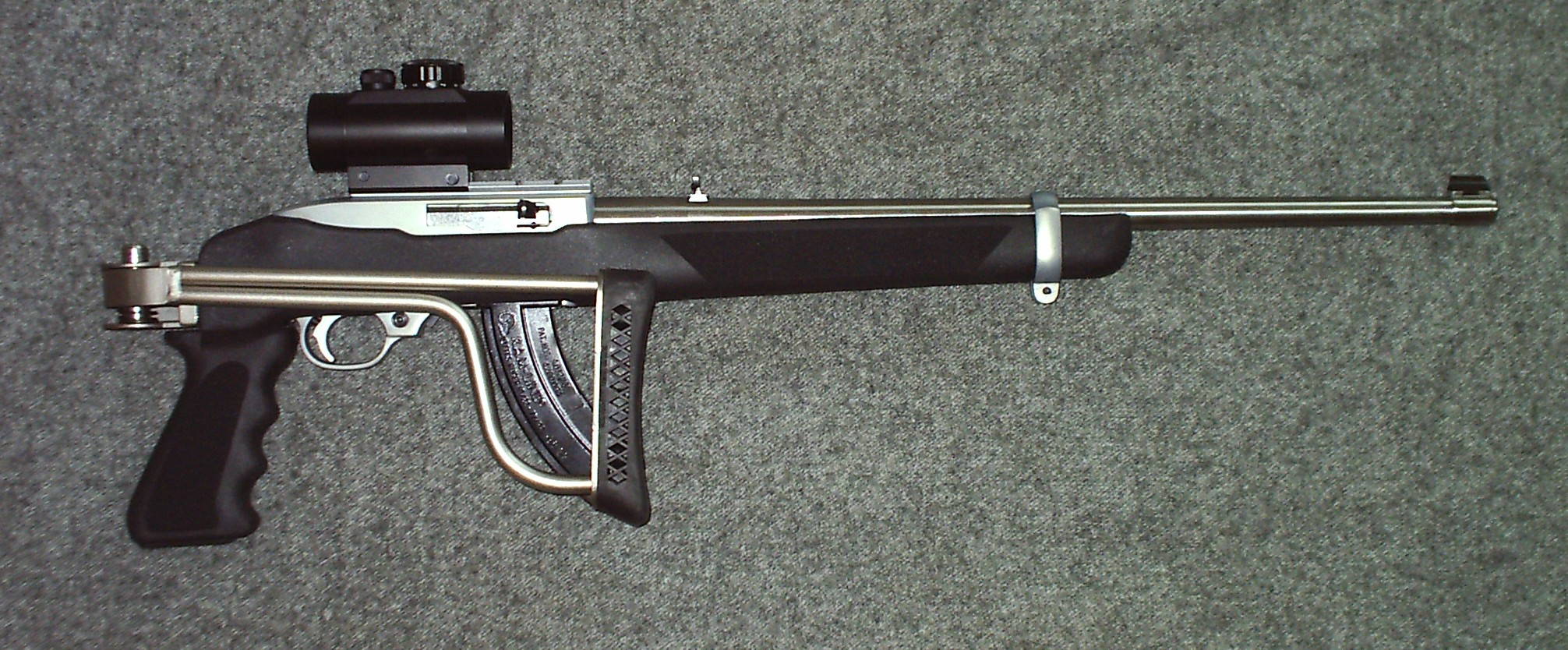
This Ruger 10/22 rifle with a pistol grip and a folding stock was classified as an assault weapon under the Federal Assault Weapons Ban.

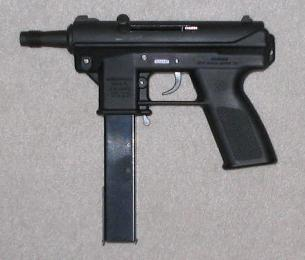
An Intratec TEC-DC9 with a 32-round magazine. This semi-automatic pistol has a threaded barrel and a magazine that attaches outside the pistol grip, two of the features listed in the Federal Assault Weapons Ban.

=== Assault Weapons Ban of 2013 bill ===
On December 16, 2012, two days after the Sandy Hook Elementary School shooting, Senator Dianne Feinstein said she would introduce a new assault weapons ban on the first day of Congress. Five days later, on December 21, Wayne LaPierre, chief executive of the National Rifle Association, held a news conference repeating the NRA's opposition to additional gun laws. Feinstein and Senator Richard Blumenthal held a separate news conference in response. There, Feinstein said that it seemed to her "prudent" to register grandfathered assault weapons under the National Firearms Act (NFA). A two-page bill summary on the senator's web site also mentioned registering grandfathered assault weapons under the NFA, but the text of the bill introduced to the Senate did not include that provision.

On January 24, 2013, Feinstein introduced S. 150, the "Assault Weapons Ban of 2013". The bill was similar to the 1994 ban, but differed in that it used a one-feature test for a firearm to qualify as an assault weapon rather than the two-feature test of the 1994 ban. On April 17, 2013, it failed on a Senate vote of 60 to 40.

== See also ==
- Gun culture in the United States
- Gun politics in the United States
- Military-style semi-automatic, New Zealand legal classification
