= Violence Policy Center =

Non-profit organization in the US

- Founded: 1988
- Founder: Josh Sugarmann
- Region served: United States
- Website: vpc.org

The Violence Policy Center (VPC) is an American nonprofit organization that advocates for gun control.

== Organizational background ==
According to Josh Sugarmann, its founder, the VPC approaches violence, and firearms violence in particular, as a public health issue affecting the whole population, rather than solely a criminal matter. The VPC is known mainly for its in-depth research on the firearms industry, the causes and effects of gun violence, and the advocacy of regulatory policies to reduce gun violence. The VPC advocates for gun control legislation and policy.

The VPC relies on donations from the public and foundation support. The primary foundation donor to the VPC is the Joyce Foundation. The VPC publicizes its research through the news media and through coalitions with other advocacy organizations.

== Activities ==
=== Annual reports on impact of gun violence ===
Using data from federal agencies such as the Federal Bureau of Investigation and the Centers for Disease Control and Prevention, the VPC publishes annual state-by-state reports on the effects of gun violence. It has examined the effects of gun violence on specific populations:

- Females murdered by males in single victim/single offender incidents, published to coincide with Domestic Violence Awareness Month in October;
- Black homicide victimization;
- Hispanic homicide victimization.

=== Concealed carry ===
The VPC maintains a "Concealed Carry Killers" database of fatal non-self defense killings involving private citizens who are legally allowed to carry concealed handguns in public. The VPC also highlights mass shootings involving persons legally allowed to carry concealed handguns in public.

The database was criticized by Clayton Cramer, who claimed that the statistics were inaccurate. John Lott's Crime Prevention Research Center website posted an article questioning the numbers presented on the Concealed Carry Killers database. According to the article, suicides, which may or may not have involved a firearm, and motor vehicle homicides caused by intoxication, are included in the statistics.

=== Gun industry donations ===
The VPC has issued reports that document the gun industry's financial contributions to the National Rifle Association (NRA). In 2013, the VPC said that the firearms industry has donated between $19.3 million and $60.2 million to the NRA since 2005.

=== 50-caliber rifles ===
The VPC has long advocated for a ban on .50-caliber rifles. In 2001, the VPC issued a study that detailed "the 50 caliber's threat as an ideal tool for assassination and terrorism, including its ability to attack and cripple key elements of the nation's critical infrastructure—including aircraft and other transportation, electrical power grids, pipeline networks, chemical plants, and other hazardous industrial facilities".

In January 2005, the VPC was featured on the CBS news and current affairs program 60 Minutes, which ran a segment on .50-caliber rifles and their alleged threat to public safety. It drew from VPC reports on the .50 BMG cartridge. Interviews were featured with both Ronnie Barrett of Barrett Firearms and Tom Diaz of the VPC.

The NRA objected, alleging that the story was biased in the VPC's favor; it claimed that no .50-caliber rifle has ever been used in the commission of a crime. In response, the VPC issued a backgrounder detailing criminal use and possession of .50-caliber rifles, including examples of murders by criminals using this weapon. The list does not clarify whether the weapons seized were possessed legally or not, and makes no distinction between use of a .50 caliber rifle in a crime and possession of a .50 caliber rifle by a person committing an unrelated crime.

In September 2004, California passed a law to ban .50 caliber rifles, the only state to do so.

=== Firearms imports ===
CBS reported that numerous firearms are sold in the United States that were illegally trafficked into Mexico and legally imported into the United States, where they are sold to "straw purchasers" and other illegal traffickers. In testimony to Congress and in reports, the VPC has stated that the U.S. government is not enforcing the "sporting purposes" test, which bans the import of firearms that lack a sporting purpose.

In 1989, ATF officials in the administration of President George H. W. Bush used their powers to prohibit the import of firearms that are not "generally recognized as particularly suitable for or readily adaptable to sporting purposes." Despite this prohibition, gun manufacturers skirted the ban by making cosmetic changes to their weapons to comply with the law. The Clinton administration reviewed the case, and as a result banned certain weapons from import.

The VPC argues that today the import ban has for the most part been abandoned, and foreign-made assault weapons—whole and in parts—are being freely imported into the United States. In response, the VPC has asked the ATF to enforce a ban on the import of foreign-made assault weapons.

=== Eddie Eagle study ===
In November, 1997 the Violence Policy Center published a study of the NRA's Eddie Eagle program, entitled Joe Camel With Feathers. Key findings included:

The primary goal of the National Rifle Association's Eddie Eagle program is not to safeguard children, but to protect the interests of the NRA and the firearms industry by making guns more acceptable to children and youth. The Eddie Eagle program employs strategies similar to those utilized by America's tobacco industry—from youth "educational" programs that are in fact marketing tools to the use of appealing cartoon characters that aim to put a friendly face on a hazardous product.

Other key findings included that "the NRA uses the Eddie Eagle as a lobbying tool" in its opposition to child access prevention laws and mandatory trigger lock laws; that "Rather than recognizing the inherent danger firearms in the home pose to children, and the often irresponsible firearms storage behavior of adults, the Eddie Eagle program places the onus of safety and responsibility on the children themselves"; and that "Public health researchers have found that 'gun safety' programs like Eddie Eagle are ineffective in preventing unintentional death and injury from firearms."

The study's key findings were summarized in major newspapers including The New York Times, The Washington Post, and the Chicago Tribune as well as regional newspapers including The Philadelphia Inquirer, Newsday, The Times-Picayune, and others, and in the book Guns in American Society: An Encyclopedia of History, Politics, Culture, and the Law edited by Gregg Lee Carter, professor of history at Bryant University in an article on Eddie Eagle by Robert J. Spitzer. The NRA called the study "ludicrous" and threaten to sue the VPC.

=== Proliferation of federal firearms licenses ===
The VPC has spoken out against the "criminal abuse" of the Federal Firearms License system, which has resulted in a proliferation of licenses. The VPC states that the high number of FFLs inflated by "kitchen counter" dealers and those not "engaged in the business" make it impossible for the ATF to regulate them all, and has called for the ATF to cease issuing such licenses in order to reduce licensees to a more manageable number. Josh Sugarmann holds a federal firearms license with the principle place of business at the address of the VPC. He has stated he does not sell firearms, although the license exempts him from many of the restrictions of Washington D.C. gun laws.

== Reception ==
The VPC distributes its published research and analysis to members of Congress and their staffs. Numerous US gun control organizations have used VPC reports and terminology to advance local and national gun control initiatives. VPC research results and policy positions have been cited by major news organizations including The New York Times, The Washington Post, the Chicago Tribune, CNN, the Associated Press, and Reuters.

== See also ==
- Joyce Foundation
