= Stockton schoolyard shooting =

1989 mass shooting in Stockton, California, U.S.

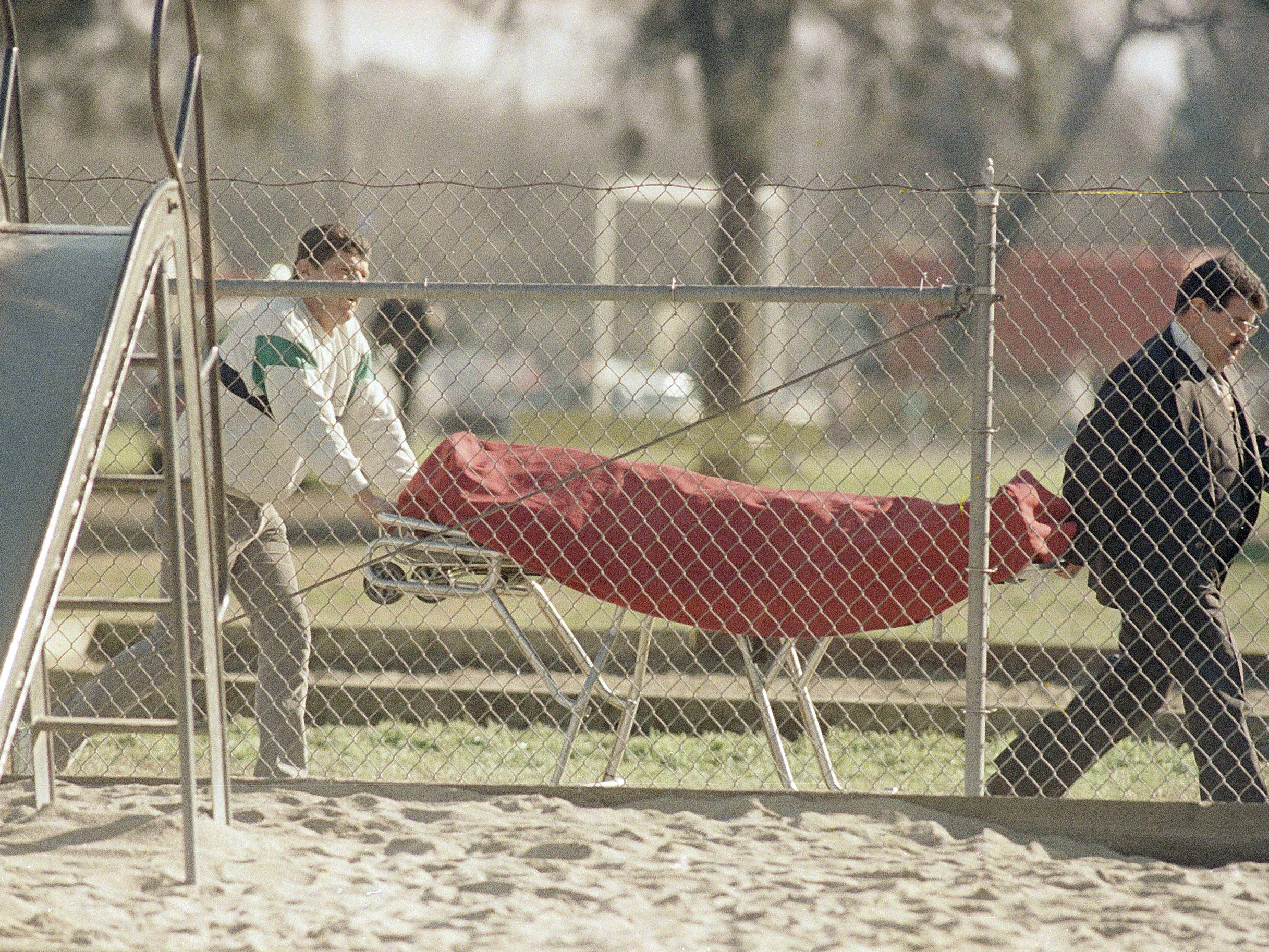
- Officials remove the body of Purdy from the grounds of Cleveland Elementary School
- Location: 37°58′56″N 121°18′03″W; Stockton, California, U.S.
- Date: January 17, 1989; 37 years ago 11:45 a.m. – 11:48 a.m. (PST)
- Target: Students and faculty at Cleveland Elementary School
- Attack type: Mass murder; school shooting; mass shooting; murder-suicide; domestic terrorism; possible hate crime
- Weapons: Norinco Type 56S semi-automatic rifle; Taurus PT92 semi-automatic pistol; Arson fire (Molotov cocktail); Bayonet (unused)
- Deaths: 6 (including the perpetrator)
- Injuries: 31
- Perpetrator: Patrick Edward Purdy
- Motive: Unknown (possible suicidal ideation, rage, and/or revenge with xenophobia accompaniment)

The Stockton schoolyard shooting occurred at Cleveland Elementary School in Stockton, California, on January 17, 1989. The perpetrator, 24-year-old Patrick Purdy, shot and killed five children and wounded thirty-one others—all but one of them children—before committing suicide approximately three minutes after first opening fire.

The shooting sparked intense public controversy regarding private ownership of assault weapons, and ultimately inspired the Roberti–Roos Assault Weapons Control Act of 1989, which prohibited the ownership and transfer of over fifty specific brands and models of assault weapons in California. This act was signed into effect on May 24, 1989.

At the time, the Stockton schoolyard shooting was the worst school shooting (in terms of number of fatalities) to occur at a non-college institution, being surpassed ten years later by the Columbine High School massacre. The shooting was also the deadliest to occur at an American elementary school until the 2012 Sandy Hook Elementary School shooting.

== Shooting ==
On the morning of Tuesday, January 17, 1989, an anonymous individual telephoned the Stockton Police Department to report a death threat against Cleveland Elementary School in Stockton, California. At approximately 11:40 a.m., Patrick Purdy arrived at the school in his battered 1977 Chevrolet Caprice station wagon; he parked the vehicle at the rear of the property and, minutes later, entered the premises through a gate carrying an AK-47 semi-automatic rifle with a fixed bayonet and two handguns. Approximately forty-five seconds later, his station wagon detonated and burned courtesy of a Molotov cocktail and two open gasoline containers he had placed inside the vehicle. Approximately three hundred children were in the school playground at this time.

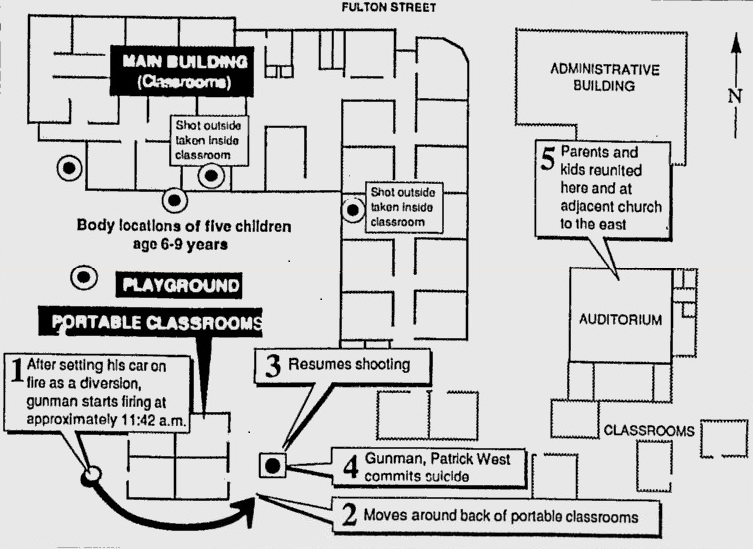
Illustration of Purdy's movements at Cleveland Elementary School on January 17, 1989, depicting the location of all fatalities. He is erroneously referred to in this diagram as Patrick West. (Note: Several initial news articles pertaining to the Stockton schoolyard shooting referred to Purdy as Patrick West; this name was one of at least three aliases Purdy had used throughout his adult life and was one of the names used on the identity cards discovered upon his body following his suicide.)

Purdy first entered the school playground, where he began firing with his semi-automatic rifle while positioned behind a portable building; he fired a total of sixty-six rounds in his initial salvo from a distance of approximately fifty yards. According to a teacher who survived this initial section of Purdy's attack on the school, Purdy "was not talking [or] yelling; he was very straight-faced ... it didn't look like he was really angry" as he fired "left to right" in a spraying motion. One child injured in this initial salvo, 6-year-old Robert Young, would later recollect his feet "were swept up" as he was shot in the foot by a bullet followed by an immediate "slap against [his] chest" as a further bullet impacted against the playground and ricocheted into his upper chest as he fell. The sole adult wounded in the shooting, second-grade teacher Janet Geng, was injured in the upper leg as she ran to the assistance of wounded children.

Purdy then ran toward a differing vantage point within the school grounds and fired the final nine rounds of ammunition from his 75-round drum magazine into fleeing children before reloading and expending all thirty rounds of ammunition within a second magazine at any available targets he sighted.

=== Police response ===
The first 911 call to emergency services was received approximately one minute after Purdy opened fire. The individual who made this call described himself as a veteran of the Vietnam War and specifically stated the gunfire sourcing from the grounds of Cleveland Elementary School was from an AK-47 rifle. This information was immediately relayed to the Stockton Police Department, who immediately dispatched armed officers to the scene.

=== Suicide of perpetrator ===
At approximately 11:48 a.m., Purdy committed suicide by shooting himself once in the right temple with a Taurus 9mm pistol. He had fired 106 rounds of ammunition — the vast majority at or in the direction of children — within the space of approximately three minutes. He was still alive when emergency responders first observed his body lying on the fringes of the playground at 11:50 a.m., although he died of his wound shortly thereafter.

Prior to embarking on his spree, Purdy had symbolically dressed in combat fatigues including a green flak jacket worn beneath a camouflage shirt jacket upon which he had inscribed "PLO", "Libya", and "Death to the Great Satin" [sic]. His identity was quickly established via documents upon his person. A subsequent autopsy revealed no traces of drugs or alcohol in Purdy's bloodstream, although traces of caffeine indicated he had likely drunk a final cup of coffee shortly before his death.

An inspection of Purdy's rifle revealed he had carved the words "freedom", "Earthman", "Victory", and "Hezbollah" upon the stock of the weapon; one pistol also bore the word "Victory" in white lettering upon the grip.

== Victims ==
Five children were killed in the Stockton schoolyard shooting; thirty children and one teacher were wounded. Two of the murdered children, Ram Chun and Rathanar Or, were brought into classrooms prior to succumbing to their injuries; the other three died on the playground. Several of those injured were critically wounded, although all survived their injuries.

Four of the children who died were of Cambodian ancestry, and the fifth was Vietnamese. All five fatalities were children of families who had emigrated to the U.S. as refugees — at least one of whom had been born inside a refugee camp. Furthermore, although the wounded consisted of children of all races, over two-thirds of the wounded were also of Southeast Asian ancestry. (Note: Sixty-nine percent of the wounded children were also of Southeast Asian ancestry, and twenty-five percent of the wounded were Caucasian. One wounded child was Native American, and one wounded child was Hispanic.)

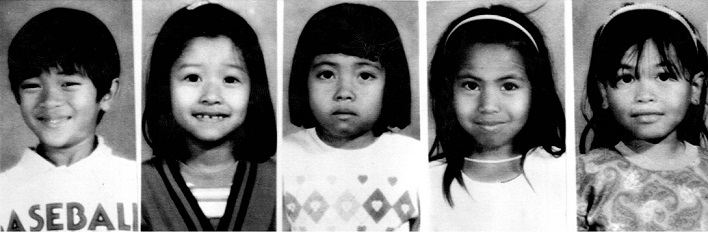
The five children killed in the Stockton schoolyard shooting. Left to right: Rathanar Or (9); Thuy Tran (6); Sokhim An (6); Oeun Lim (8); Ram Chun (6).

=== Funerals and community mourning service ===
On January 23, 1989, a two-hour service to remember the victims of the Stockton schoolyard shooting was observed at the Stockton Civic Center. This multifaith service was attended by over 2,000 mourners and saw many attendees wearing black and white ribbons in a traditional Cambodian symbolic gesture of mourning in the presence of the flower-draped caskets of four of the murdered children.

This service concluded with five minutes of silence — one for each victim — and was followed by the funerals of four of the five children. These funeral services observed the Buddhist rituals in accordance with the beliefs of Oeun Lim and Rathanhar Or and the Baptist faiths of Sokhim An and Ram Chun. The fifth child murdered in the Stockton schoolyard shooting, Thuy Tran, had been laid to rest on January 21 in a Christian burial following Mass in accordance with her Roman Catholic beliefs. Nonetheless, Tran's loss was also observed at this service, in which Christian hymns were also sung within a community chorus. All five children were buried in the same cemetery.

== Perpetrator ==
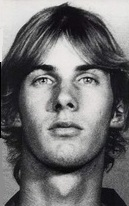
Mugshot of Patrick Purdy, c. 1985

=== Early life ===
Patrick Edward Purdy (November 10, 1964 – January 17, 1989) was born in Tacoma, Washington, to Patrick Benjamin and Kathleen (née Snyder) Purdy. He had one older sister, Cynthia (b. August 1963). At the time of Purdy's birth, his father was a soldier in the U.S. Army and was stationed at Fort Lewis. Following his dishonorable discharge from the military, Purdy Sr. worked as a taxi driver.

When Purdy was two years old, his mother filed for divorce against her husband following an incident in which he had threatened to kill her with a firearm. Purdy's mother later moved with her children to South Lake Tahoe, California before settling in Stockton, where Purdy attended Cleveland Elementary from kindergarten through to second grade. Resultingly, Purdy seldom saw his father as a young child.

Purdy's mother remarried a man named Albert Gulart in October 1968; the couple had one child: Albert Jr. (b. November 1968), although neither son had a close relationship with his mother, who devoted much of her free time to socializing and reportedly abused alcohol on a regular basis — often in the presence of her children. In addition, Gulart is known to have physically assaulted his wife in the presence of his stepchildren. Purdy's stepfather would later state that, as a child, his stepson was overly quiet and markedly emotional with a reputation among his peers as a loner.

In the fall of 1973, Purdy's mother and stepfather separated; she moved with her children from Stockton to Sacramento. That December, the Sacramento Child Protective Services were twice called to her residence in response to a neighbor's allegations that Kathleen was physically abusing and neglecting her children. All three children would be taken into protective custody due to concerns of neglect, although charges against Purdy's mother were dropped when she agreed to participate in a counseling program. She later regained custody of her children.

=== Adolescence ===
In the summer of 1978, Purdy, then aged thirteen, struck his mother in the face following a heated argument. As a result, he was permanently banned from her house. This incident instilled a lifelong belief within Purdy that he had been abandoned by his mother. He briefly lived on the streets of San Francisco and — having no alternative to survive — briefly resorted to prostitution. Shortly thereafter, he was placed in temporary foster care before being placed in the custody of his father, who had relocated to Lodi, California, following his divorce from Purdy's mother.

Purdy enrolled in Tokay High School in September 1979, although he was an unmotivated student and something of an outcast. He attended high school only sporadically and gradually became an alcoholic and a drug addict with an accumulated criminal record for offenses including drug dealing, robbery, and burglary. At his father's urging, Purdy would undergo treatment at a Stockton drug rehabilitation clinic in the early 1980s. This treatment only produced limited results, although a counselor would note Purdy's behavior was indicative of an individual "seeking a father figure to restrain him," adding: "If his acting out is not contained now, he will develop into a highly deceptive sociopathic character and be practically untreatable."

On September 6, 1981, Purdy's father died after being struck by a car. His family filed a wrongful death suit in San Joaquin Superior Court against the driver of the car, seeking $600,000 in damages; the suit was later dismissed. According to relatives, although Purdy's father had left his son $5,000 in his will, his mother refused to give him his bequeathment — instead using the money to purchase herself a car and fund a lavish trip to New York City. (Note: Purdy and his half-brother would vandalize this car in February 1986. His mother reported this act to police claiming her son — who frequently abused alcohol and drugs — had committed this act after she refused to give him money to purchase narcotics.) This incident greatly deepened the animosity between the two.

Following his father's death, Purdy was briefly homeless; he alternately slept on the streets, in cheap motels, or flophouses, supporting himself financially with odd jobs, petty theft, and small-time drug dealing. He was eventually placed in the custody of a foster mother in Los Angeles until he turned eighteen.

=== Criminal activities ===
Purdy's first known criminal activities occurred in October 1978, when officers from the Sacramento Police Department confiscated BB guns and knives from Purdy, then thirteen years old. In May 1980, Purdy was first arrested for a court order violation; he would also be arrested for underage drinking the following month. In August 1980, he would be arrested in West Hollywood for soliciting an undercover police officer. A single arrest — again for a court order violation — would occur in 1981, and further arrests for breaking and entry, cultivation and possession of marijuana, and drug dealing would occur in 1982. Arrests for possession of an illegal weapon, public intoxication, drunk driving, and receipt of stolen property would occur in 1983.

At age nineteen, Purdy briefly relocated to Florida. He found employment in Key West, but returned to California after approximately one month. Shortly thereafter, on October 11, 1984, he and another man were arrested for an attempted purse snatching in Broderick. At the time of this arrest, both Purdy and his accomplice were homeless and living on the shores of the Sacramento River. Purdy pleaded guilty to being an accessory to a felony and spent thirty-two days in the Yolo County Jail.

=== Later years ===
Due to Purdy's alcohol and drug dependency, he was awarded disability support by the Social Security Administration in November 1984. Beginning in 1985, Purdy did make sporadic efforts to improve his life by undergoing various forms of vocational training. Although he did pass several courses, he failed to gain many skills.

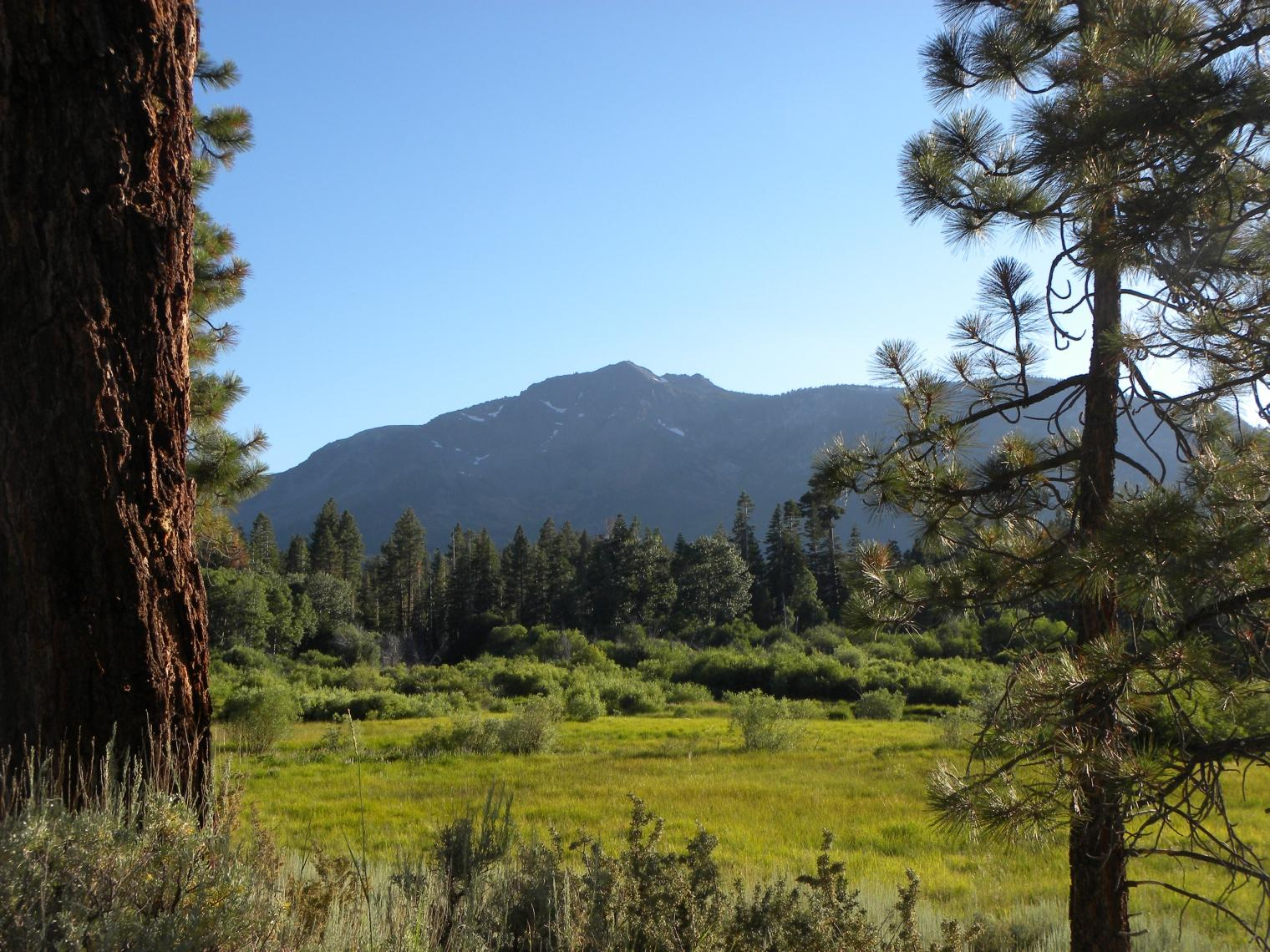
The Eldorado National Forest. Purdy and his half-brother were arrested for firing a semi-automatic pistol at this location in April 1987.

In April 1987, Purdy and his half-brother, Albert Gulart Jr., were arrested for firing a semi-automatic pistol at trees in the Eldorado National Forest while both were intoxicated. Both were charged with vandalism and the unlawful discharge of a firearm and, in Purdy's case, resisting arrest and assaulting a police officer. While incarcerated and awaiting trial for this offense, Purdy attempted suicide by attempting to cut his wrists with his fingernails before hanging himself with his T-shirt. This attempt was thwarted, and Purdy — weeping at having survived his suicide attempt — was restrained to a bed. Transferred to a psychiatric hospital to undergo a psychiatric assessment, Purdy was found to have a mild mental impairment and to be a danger to both himself and others. He was ruled competent to stand trial and pleaded guilty to the outstanding charges. Purdy was sentenced to serve 45 days' imprisonment.

In the fall of 1987, Purdy began attending welding classes at San Joaquin Delta College. He successfully completed two vocational courses although according to fellow students, he complained about the high percentage of Southeast Asian students enrolled in industrial arts courses at the facility and of his belief "boat people" were taking jobs from American citizens. In October 1987, Purdy left California and alternately drifted among Oregon, Nevada, Texas, Florida, Connecticut, and South Carolina, searching for welding, security guard and general laboring jobs. Purdy frequently obtained employment, although his tendency to argue with his superiors typically saw him either fired or resigning within a matter of weeks.

Purdy secured employment at Numeri Tech, a small machine shop located in Stockton, in early January 1988. This employment lasted one month, and from March to May that year, he worked as a welder — also in Stockton. Between July and October, he worked as a boilermaker in Portland, Oregon, living in Sandy with a paternal aunt and her husband.

According to Purdy's few friends, although he was never outwardly violent, he periodically exhibited suicidal traits and was openly frustrated that he had failed to "make it [in life] on his own". The night-shift supervisor at Numeri Tech, Steven Sloan, later recollected of Purdy's mindset in early 1988: "He was a real ball of frustration, and was angry about everything," adding Purdy sensed he was "being dealt a short deck" in life. (Note: In a notebook found in a hotel where Purdy lived in early 1988, Purdy had written about himself in the following terms: "I'm so dumb, I'm dumber than a sixth-grader. My mother and father were dumb.") Another of Purdy's former co-workers also stated: "He was always miserable. I've never seen a guy that didn't want to smile as much as he didn't."

=== Final months ===
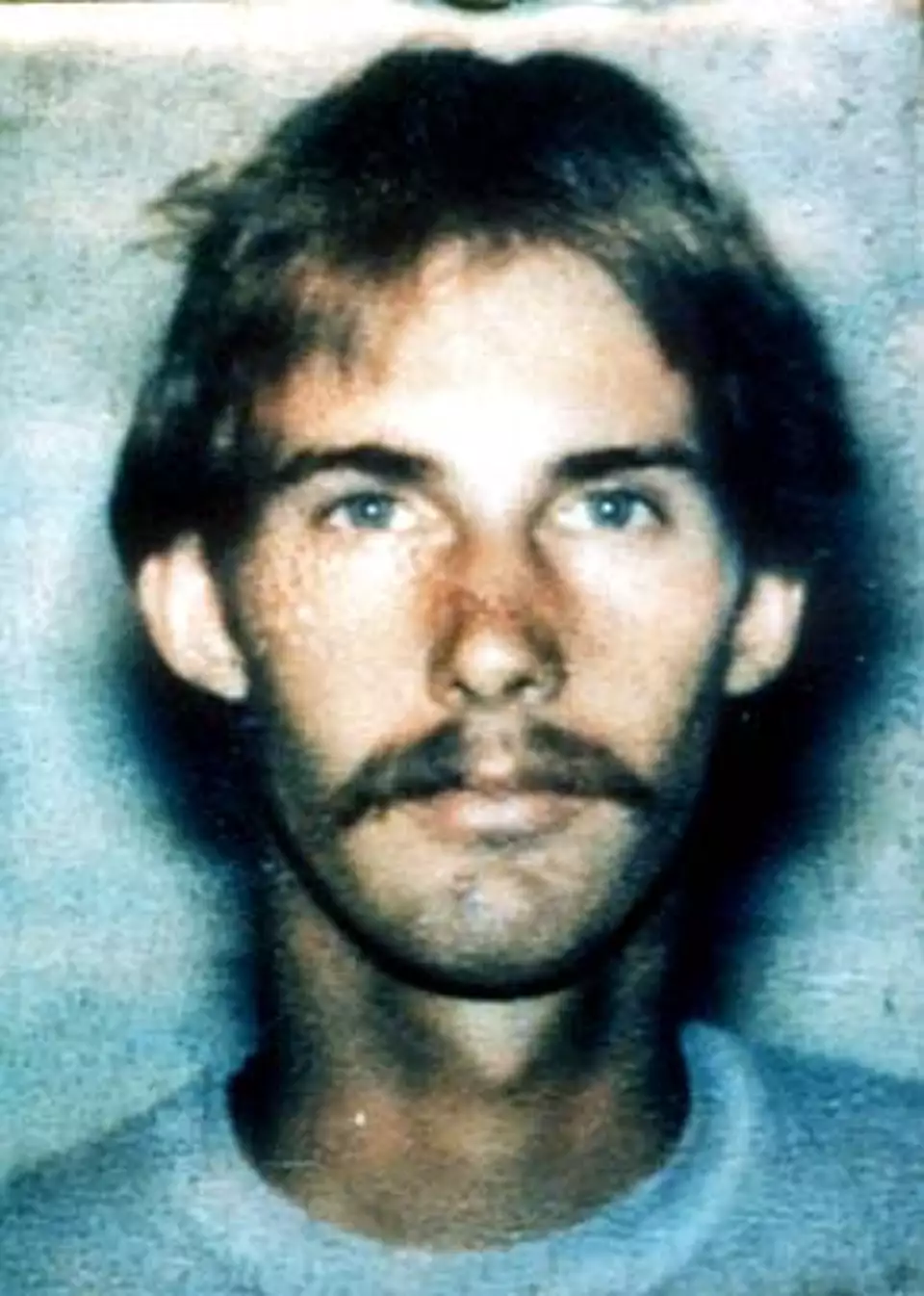
Purdy, c. 1987

On August 3, 1988, Purdy purchased a Norinco Type 56S semi-automatic rifle for $350 at a sporting goods store in Sandy, Oregon; (Note: Several contemporary media accounts describe this rifle as an AK-47; the Norinco Type 56S rifle is a Chinese version of the Russian AK-47 rifle.) this would be the weapon he used in the Stockton schoolyard shooting. That October, Purdy was made redundant. He later relocated to Texas, where he unsuccessfully sought employment before traveling to Tennessee, securing well-paying welding employment in Memphis. This lasted for one month, and Purdy worked in menial employment in Windsor, Connecticut between November and December.

On December 26, Purdy abruptly quit his employment and returned to Stockton; he rented a room at the El Rancho Motel, paying $95 per week. He resided at this address until his death. Two days later, on December 28, Purdy purchased a Taurus 9mm pistol at a Stockton pawn shop. Sixteen days later, on January 13, he was allowed to collect the weapon. (Note: Contemporary state laws required an individual purchasing a firearm to wait 15 days before collecting the weapon. Purdy was able to legally purchase these firearms as background checks revealed his criminal record consisted only of misdemeanors.) Prior to purchasing this weapon, he had purchased four other handguns, with the first being bought in 1984.

Purdy left his motel for the last time at approximately 10:40 on the morning of his death. A search of his motel room following the shooting revealed a broken .22 caliber rifle, an olive-drab cloth emblazoned with three menacing caricature faces and the inscriptions "V for victory" and "F for Freedom", and over 100 toy plastic soldiers placed in strategic locations throughout the room. No suicide note was discovered, although the items recovered led Stockton Police Captain Dennis Perry to remark: "He obviously had a military hangup of some kind ... It suggests this guy may have had delusions of grandeur about Iran." Perry would also dismiss suggestions the murders had been racially motivated, informing reporters that Purdy held no particular grudge against particular ethnic groups and that as he was "a loner, no friends ... no particularly known girlfriends" he had gradually developed a "distinct dislike for everybody — not a particular race, everybody."

== Motive ==
Although Purdy's ultimate motive for his attack remains unknown, the official report into Purdy's actions reached evident conclusions: He had primarily, though not exclusively, targeted children of Southeast Asian ancestry attending an elementary school within Stockton he had previously attended and in a city which, in the eight years prior to the massacre, had seen the population of Southeast Asians — the vast majority of whom were refugees or children of refugees — increase from fewer than 1,000 to over 30,000. (Note: At the time of the Stockton schoolyard shooting, approximately two-thirds of the students of Cleveland Elementary School were of Southeast Asian ancestry.)

The official report concluded that although Purdy had harbored suicidal thoughts for two years prior to his death, he had firmly decided to end his life by mid-December of 1988 and had spent a minimum of three weeks methodically preparing himself for the act, which he fully intended to end with his own suicide. He had chosen to "kill others at the same time to make his end dramatic and cause people to remember him" due in part to the fact he had "never achieved success or attention during his life". In addition, racial prejudice had likely been a "major part" of his choice of target, which itself may have been a symbolic one.

One hour before embarking on his murder spree, Purdy is known to have remarked to a fellow resident of the El Rancho motel: "Those damn Hindus and boat people own everything!" He is known to have made a similar remark in a bar shortly after New Year's Day 1989 (Note: In this instance, Purdy concluded his discussion with the patron to whom he made this remark by stating: "You're going to read about me in the papers.") and to have expressed to many a resentful belief Asian immigrants took jobs from "native-born" Americans. Over the following days, Purdy's vehicle was seen parked outside several Stockton schools with a high percentage of Southeast Asian pupils in apparent surveillance of the facilities before he evidently selected Cleveland Elementary School as his choice of target.

No adults present throughout Purdy's childhood and adolescence had provided stable role models throughout his formative years and the death of his father in 1981, at a time of reasonable stability in his life, had likely been viewed by Purdy as a further unjust abandonment. He is known to have suffered from severe depression throughout his life and to have repeatedly expressed frustrations regarding his lack of familial stability, education, and personal accomplishments. His targeting of the children of immigrants with a generally high demographic academic achievement, within an educational faculty he had himself attended in his formative years, was likely a symbolic act of suicidal rage against society — with an evident resentful xenophobic accompaniment — for the fortune, stability and potential given to some within society including immigrants, but not to others including himself.

== Aftermath ==
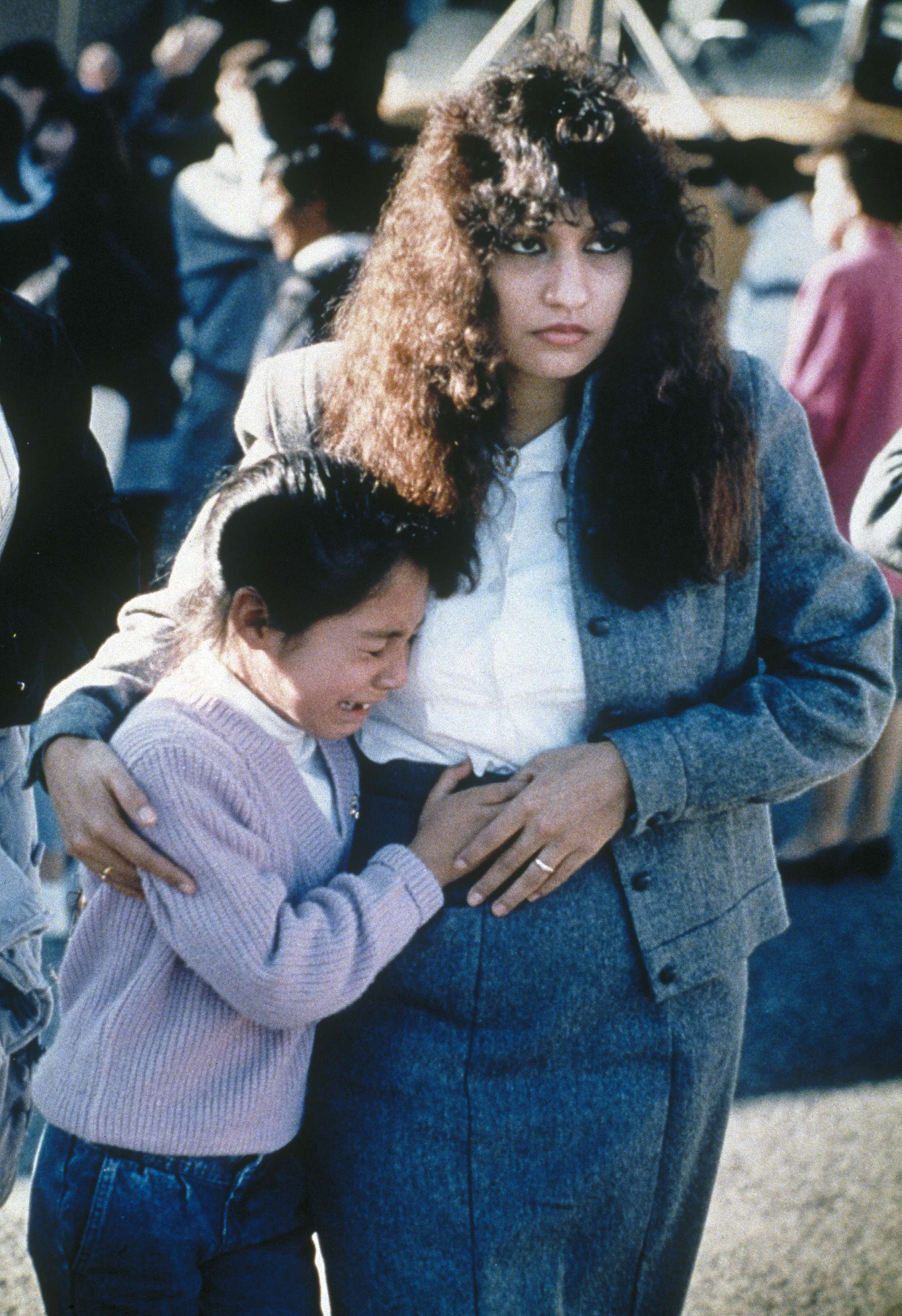
Seven-year-old Monique Lopez, pictured with her mother, Margo, shortly after the Stockton schoolyard shooting

The Stockton schoolyard shooting was the fifth attack by a lone gunman upon students or faculty members to occur at an American educational establishment in less than a year, and was the deadliest to occur (in terms of number of fatalities) in an American elementary school at the time. The event received extensive national news coverage and spurred calls for the regulation of semiautomatic weapons. An article published in Time magazine less than two weeks after the event posed the question: "Why could Purdy, an alcoholic who had been arrested for such offenses as selling weapons and attempted robbery, walk into a gun shop in Sandy, Oregon, and leave with an AK-47 under his arm?" (Note: Contemporary laws did not require Purdy to undergo a police check because the weapon he purchased was not concealable. Furthermore, at the time of purchase, the rifle was not fully automatic. Purdy later converted the firearm to fire in fully automatic mode.) The article continued: "The easy availability of weapons like this, which have no purpose other than killing human beings, can all too readily turn the delusions of sick gunmen into tragic nightmares."

On May 24, 1989, California would become the first state in North America to pass an act prohibiting the ownership of assault weapons. This act — the Roberti-Roos Assault Weapons Control Act of 1989 — was the strongest gun control legislation passed in two decades and saw any firearm upon a list specified in Penal Code section 12276 be classified as a prohibited assault weapon. Two months later, the Bush Administration ruled that over forty models of assault weapon be permanently declassified as legitimately valid for importation into the United States as being "generally regarded [as] suitable for sporting purposes" — as had been previously cited in the Gun Control Act of 1968. The ruling also specified that the estimated 20,000 weapons already currently intercepted at the U.S. border be either sold to law enforcement agencies within America or returned to their country of origin.

I looked at her and I knew it was [Oeun Lim]. She wore red shoes ... I always talked to her about her red shoes, because red's my favorite color. Her face was not damaged. I knew it was Oeun, but I said, 'I can't be sure.'

— Second-grade teacher Julie Schardt, recollecting being asked to identify the body of Oeun Lim (2014).

The principal of Cleveland Elementary School, Patricia Busher, opted to reopen the school the day following the Stockton schoolyard shooting, with trained counselors on-site to offer therapy. All staff members except the sole teacher wounded returned to their posts on January 18, although the majority of parents chose to keep their children at home. That afternoon and evening, both Busher and other staff members visited the household of every pupil who had been kept at home to offer reassurance and support to the family and by Thursday, January 19, 674 of the school's 970 pupils had returned to Cleveland Elementary School.

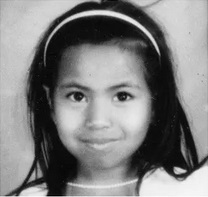
Oeun Lim, pictured in December 1988

Three weeks after the shooting, on February 7, Michael Jackson made a short visit to the school; he personally met and spoke with several of the children and staff members affected by the event.

Several survivors of the Stockton schoolyard shooting later formed Cleveland School Remembers: a Stockton-based non-profit organization aimed at reducing all forms of gun violence and spreading awareness of the lasting impact gun violence has not just on direct survivors, but upon entire communities. The organization actively operates on a local and national level.

In January 2024, one of the founders of Cleveland School Remembers, Judy Weldon, would reflect: "If you think that the shooting was a long time ago and [it is] over and done with, you'd be wrong ... Some who were on campus that day live in stress and fear, even after so many years."

== Media ==
=== Literature ===
- Berry-Dee, Christopher (2023). Talking with Psychopaths: Mass Murderers and Spree Killers. New York: Diversion Books. ISBN 978-1-6357-6868-8.
- Cawthorne, Nigel; Tibballs, Geoff (1993). Killers: Contract Killers, Spree Killers, Sex Killers. The Ruthless Exponents of Murder. London: Boxtree. ISBN 0-7522-0850-0.
- Davidson, Osha Gray (1998). Under Fire: The NRA and the Battle for Gun Control. Iowa City: University of Iowa Press. ISBN 978-1-587-29042-8.
- Duwe, Grant (2014). Mass Murder in the United States: A History. North Carolina: McFarland Incorporated. ISBN 978-0-786-43150-2.
- Fleming, Anthony K. (2012). Gun Policy in the United States and Canada: The Impact of Mass Murders and Assassinations on Gun Control. London: Bloomsbury Publishing. ISBN 978-1-441-13052-5.
- Flowers, Angelyn Spaulding; Pixley, Cotina Lane (2020). Twenty Years of School-based Mass Shootings in the United States. New York: Lexington Books. ISBN 978-1-793-61314-1.
- Foreman, Laura (1992). Mass Murderers: True Crime. New York: Time-Life Books. ISBN 0-7835-0004-1.
- Fox, James Alan; Levin, Jack (2005). Extreme Killing: Understanding Serial and Mass Murder. London: Sage Publications. ISBN 978-0-761-98857-1.
- Franscell, Ron (2011). Delivered from Evil: True Stories of Ordinary People Who Faced Monstrous Mass Killers and Survived. Massacheusetts: Fair Winds Press. ISBN 978-1-592-33440-7.
- Lane, Brian; Gregg, Wilfred (1994). The Encyclopedia of Mass Murder. London: Headline Book Publishing. ISBN 0-747-20897-2.
- Mijares, Tomas J.; McCarthy, Ronald M. (2015). Significant Tactical Police Cases: Learning from Past Events to Improve Upon Future Responses. Illinois: Charles C. Thomas Publishing. ISBN 978-0-398-08126-3.
- Ramsland, Katherine M. (2005). Inside the Minds of Mass Murderers: Why They Kill. Connecticut: Greenwood Publishing Group. ISBN 978-0-275-98475-5.
- Saito, Leland T. (2023). Race and Politics: Asian Americans, Latinos, and Whites in a Los Angeles Suburb. Champaign: University of Illinois Press. ISBN 978-0-252-05531-7.
- Schildkraut, Jaclyn (2018). Mass Shootings in America: Understanding the Debates, Causes, and Responses. Santa Barbara: ABC-CLIO. ISBN 978-1-440-85624-2.
- Sommers, Michael A.; Cross, Nathaniel (2011). Understanding Your Right to Bear Arms. New York: The Rosen Publishing Inc. ISBN 978-1-448-84664-1.
- Vizzard, William J. (2000). Shots in the Dark: The Policy, Politics, and Symbolism of Gun Control. Lanham, Maryland: Rowman & Littlefield Publishers. ISBN 978-0-847-69560-7.

=== Television ===
- The 2023 documentary What Will Save Us? - Remembering the Stockton School Shooting focuses upon the Stockton school shooting. Narrated by Alex Bell, this documentary features interviews with many individuals directly impacted by the shooting, including wounded students.

== See also ==
- Gun violence in the United States
- List of homicides in California
- List of massacres in California
- List of murdered American children
- List of rampage killers in the United States
- List of school shootings in the United States by death toll
- List of school shootings in the United States (before 2000)
- Mass murder
- Mass shootings in the United States
- Spree shooting
- Suicidal ideation
