= Right to keep and bear arms in the United States =

Fundamental right in the United States Constitution

In the United States, the right to keep and bear arms is a fundamental right protected by the Second Amendment to the United States Constitution, part of the Bill of Rights, and by the constitutions of most U.S. states. The Second Amendment declares:

A well regulated Militia, being necessary to the security of a free State, the right of the people to keep and bear Arms, shall not be infringed.

Stemming from English common-law tradition, the concept of a right to keep and bear arms was recognized prior to the creation of a written national constitution.

== English precedent ==
The American understanding of the right to keep and bear arms was influenced by the English Bill of Rights 1689, an Act of Parliament, which also dealt with personal defence by Protestant English subjects.

The Bill of Rights rescinded and deplored acts of the deposed King James II, a Catholic, who had forced the disarming of Protestants, while arming and deploying armed Catholics contrary to law, among other alleged violations of individual rights. The Bill of Rights did not, however, provide a universal right to bear arms and explicitly reserved the right to Protestants - "That the subjects which are Protestants may have arms for their defense suitable to their conditions and as allowed by law."

It also established that the power to regulate the right to bear arms belonged to Parliament, not the monarch.

Sir William Blackstone wrote in the 18th century about the right to have arms being auxiliary to the "natural right of resistance and self-preservation", but conceded that the right was subject to their suitability and allowance by law.

The fifth and last auxiliary right of the subject, that I shall at present mention, is that of having arms for their defence, suitable to their condition and degree, and such as are allowed by law. Which is also declared by the same statute and is indeed a public allowance, under due restrictions, of the natural right of resistance and self-preservation, when the sanctions of society and laws are found insufficient to restrain the violence of oppression.

== Reception statutes ==
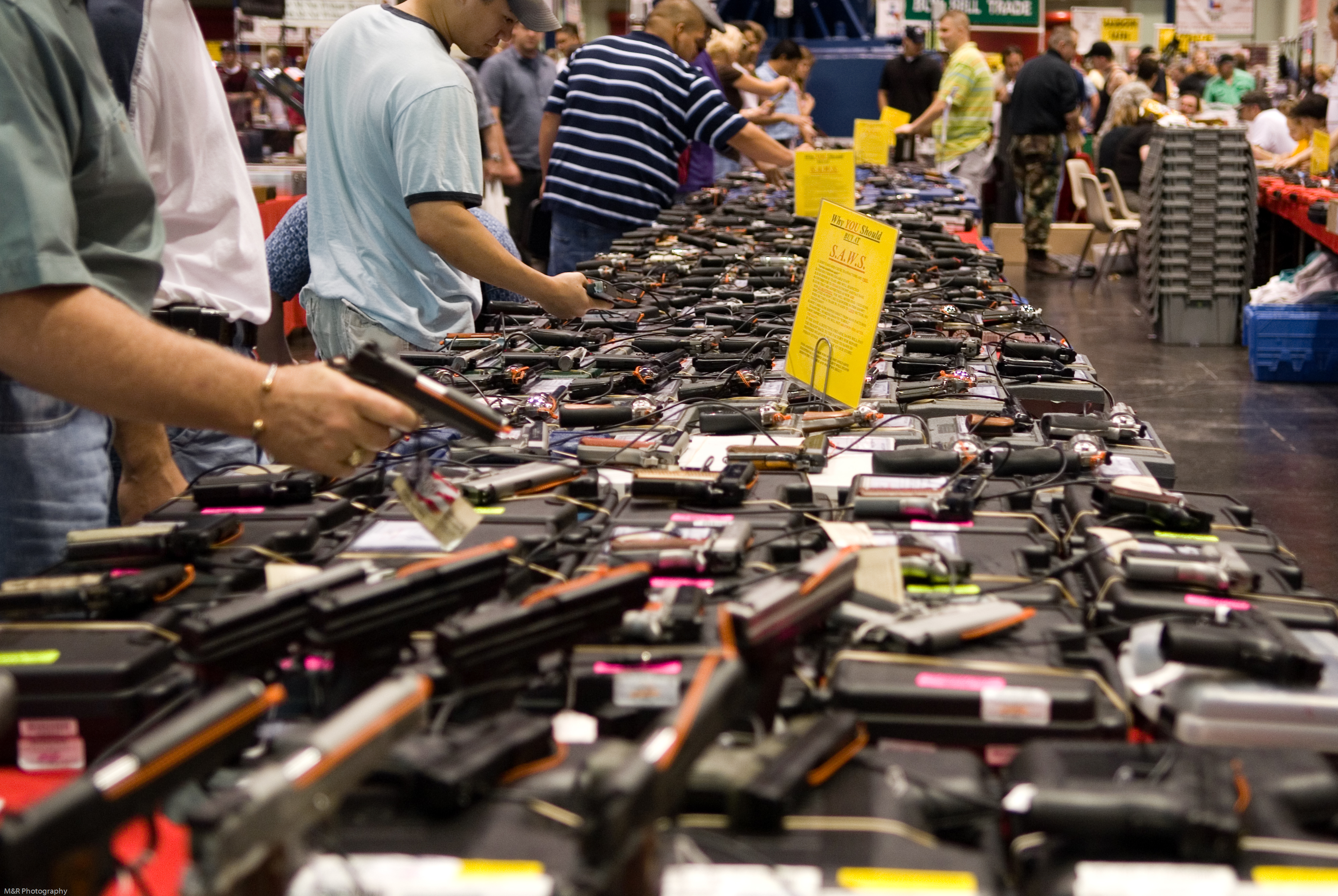
Gun show, in the U.S.

After the 1776 American Revolution, one of the first legislative acts undertaken by most of the newly independent states was to adopt a reception statute that gave legal effect to the existing body of English common law to the extent that the legislation or the constitution had not explicitly rejected English law.

For example, The Reception Statute of Virginia (1776):

And be it further ordained, That the common law of England, all statutes or acts of Parliament made in aid of the common law prior to the fourth year of the reign of King James the first, and which are of a general nature, not local to that kingdom, together with the several acts of the General Assembly of this colony now in force, so far as the same may consist with several ordinances, declarations, and resolutions of the General Convention, shall be the rule of decision, and shall be considered as in full force, until the same shall be altered by the legislative power of this colony.

The Reception statute of Pennsylvania (1777):

( 1.) Each and every one of the laws or acts of general assembly, that were in force and binding on the inhabitants of the said province on the 14th day of May last, shall be in force and binding on the inhabitants of this state, from and after the 10th day of February next, as fully and effectually, to all intents and purposes, as if the said laws, and each of them, had been made or enacted by this general assembly . . . and the common law and such of the statute laws of England, as have heretofore been in force in the said province, except as hereafter excepted. (2.) Provided always, that so much of every law or act of general assembly of the province aforesaid, . . . as declares, orders, directs or commands any matter or thing repugnant to, against, or inconsistent with the constitution of this commonwealth, is hereby declared not to be revived, but shall be null and void, and of no force or effect; and so much of the statute laws of England aforesaid relating to felonies, as takes notice of or relates to treason or misprision of treason, or directs the style of the process in any case whatsoever, shall be, and is hereby declared, of no force or effect, anything herein contained to the contrary notwithstanding.

The New York Constitution of 1777 provides that:

[S]uch parts of the common law of England, and of the statute law of England and Great Britain, and of the acts of the legislature of the colony of New York, as together did form the law of the said colony on the 19th day of April, in the year of our Lord one thousand seven hundred and seventy-five, shall be and continue the law of this State, subject to such alterations and provisions as the legislature of this State shall, from time to time, make concerning the same.

Over time, as new states were formed from federal territories, the territorial reception statutes became obsolete and were re-enacted as state law. For example, a reception statute enacted by legislation in the state of Washington states:

The common law, so far as it is not inconsistent with the Constitution and laws of the United States, or of the state of Washington nor incompatible with the institutions and condition of society in this state, shall be the rule of decision in all the courts of this state."

Missouri's reception of the common law is codified under Missouri Revised Statutes Section 1.010 (2000). The statute reads:

The common law of England and all statutes and acts of parliament made prior to the fourth year of the reign of James the First, of a general nature, which are local to that kingdom and not repugnant to or inconsistent with the Constitution of the United States, the constitution of this state, or the statute laws in force for the time being, are the rule of action and decision in this state, any custom or usage to the contrary notwithstanding, but no act of the general assembly or law of this state shall be held to be invalid, or limited in its scope or effect by the courts of this state, for the reason that it is in derogation of, or in conflict with, the common law, or with such statutes or acts of parliament; but all acts of the general assembly, or laws, shall be liberally construed, so as to effectuate the true intent and meaning thereof.

== Civilian usage meaning ==
Annual gun production in the U.S. has increased substantially in the 21st century, after having remained fairly level over preceding decades. By 2023, a majority of U.S. states allowed adults to carry concealed guns in public.

U.S. gun sales have risen in the 21st century, peaking in 2020 during the COVID-19 pandemic. "NICS" is the FBI's National Instant Background Check System.

In United States v. Cruikshank (1876), the U.S. Supreme Court recognized that the right to arms preexisted the Constitution and in that case and in Presser v. Illinois (1886) recognized that the Second Amendment protected the right from being infringed by Congress. In United States v. Miller (1939), the Court again recognized that the right to arms is individually held and, citing the Tennessee case of Aymette v State, indicated that it protected the right to keep and bear arms that are "part of the ordinary military equipment" or the use of which could "contribute to the common defense." In its first opportunity to rule specifically on whose right the Second Amendment protects, District of Columbia v. Heller (2008), the Court ruled that the amendment protects an individual right "to keep and carry arms in case of confrontation," not contingent on service in a militia, while indicating, in dicta, that restrictions on the possession of firearms by felons and the mentally ill, on the carrying of arms in sensitive locations, and with respect to the conditions on the sale of firearms could pass constitutional muster. In McDonald v. Chicago (2010), the Court applied incorporation doctrine to extend the Second Amendment's protections nationwide.

The people's right to have their own arms for their defense is described in the philosophical and political writings of Aristotle, Cicero, John Locke, Machiavelli, the English Whigs and others. Though possessing arms appears to be distinct from "bearing" them, the possession of arms is recognized as necessary for and a logical precursor to the bearing of arms. Don Kates, a civil liberties lawyer, cites historic English usage describing the "right to keep and bear their private arms." Likewise, Sayoko Blodgett-Ford notes a non-military usage of the phrase in a pamphlet widely circulated by the dissenting minority dating from the time of the Pennsylvania ratifying convention for the U.S. Constitution:

[T]he people have a right to bear arms for the defense of themselves and their own state, or the United States, or the purpose of killing game; and no law shall be passed for disarming the people or any of them, unless for crimes committed ...

In commentary written by Judge Garwood in United States v. Emerson, the United States Court of Appeals for the Fifth Circuit concluded in 2001 that:

... there are numerous instances of the phrase 'bear arms' being used to describe a civilian's carrying of arms. Early constitutional provisions or declarations of rights in at least some ten different states speak of the right of the 'people' [or 'citizen' or 'citizens'] 'to bear arms in defense of themselves [or 'himself'] and the state,' or equivalent words, thus indisputably reflecting that under common usage 'bear arms' was in no sense restricted to bearing arms in military service. See Bliss v. Commonwealth, 13 Am. Dec. 251, 12 Ky. 90 (Ky. 1822).

Similarly, in a released Senate report on the Right to Keep and Bear Arms, Senator Orrin Hatch, chairman, of the U.S. Senate Judiciary Committee, Subcommittee on the Constitution, states:

They argue that the Second Amendment's words "right of the people" mean "a right of the state" – apparently overlooking the impact of those same words when used in the First and Fourth Amendments. The "right of the people" to assemble or to be free from unreasonable searches and seizures is not contested as an individual guarantee. Still they ignore consistency and claim that the right to "bear arms" relates only to military uses. This not only violates a consistent constitutional reading of "right of the people" but also ignores that the second amendment protects a right to "keep" arms. "When our ancestors forged a land "conceived in liberty", they did so with musket and rifle. When they reacted to attempts to dissolve their free institutions, and established their identity as a free nation, they did so as a nation of armed freemen. When they sought to record forever a guarantee of their rights, they devoted one full amendment out of ten to nothing but the protection of their right to keep and bear arms against governmental interference. Under my chairmanship the Subcommittee on the Constitution will concern itself with a proper recognition of, and respect for, this right most valued by free men.

Likewise, the U.S. Supreme Court ruled in District of Columbia v. Heller (2008), No. 07-290, that "[t]he Second Amendment protects an individual right to possess a firearm unconnected with service in a militia, and to use that arm for traditionally lawful purposes, such as self-defense within the home."

== Military service and civilian usage meanings ==
Some historians have argued that prior to and through the 18th century, the expression "bear arms" appeared exclusively in military contexts, as opposed to the use of firearms by civilians.

In late-eighteenth-century parlance, bearing arms was a term of art with an obvious military and legal connotation. ... As a review of the Library of Congress's data base of congressional proceedings in the revolutionary and early national periods reveals, the thirty uses of 'bear arms' and 'bearing arms' in bills, statutes, and debates of the Continental, Confederation, and United States' Congresses between 1774 and 1821 invariably occur in a context exclusively focused on the army or the militia.

However, this conclusion is disputed and may be due to selection bias, which arises from the use of a limited selection of government documents that overwhelmingly refer to matters of military service. Commenting on this previous research, other historians note:

Searching more comprehensive collections of English language works published before 1820 shows that there are a number of uses that ... have nothing to do with military service ... [and] The common law was in agreement. Edward Christian's edition of Blackstone's Commentaries that appeared in 1790s described the rights of Englishmen (which every American colonist had been promised) in these terms 'everyone is at liberty to keep or carry a gun, if he does not use it for the [unlawful] destruction of game.' This right was separate from militia duties.

The Oxford English Dictionary defines the term to bear arms as: "to serve as a soldier, do military service, fight," dating to about 1330.

Garry Wills, author and history professor at Northwestern University, has written of the origin of the term bear arms:

By legal and other channels, the Latin "arma ferre" entered deeply into the European language of war. Bearing arms is such a synonym for waging war that Shakespeare can call a just war " 'justborne arms" and a civil war "self-borne arms." Even outside the special phrase "bear arms," much of the noun's use echoes Latin phrases: to be under arms (sub armis), the call to arms (ad arma), to follow arms (arma sequi), to take arms (arma capere), to lay down arms (arma pœnere). "Arms" is a profession that one brother chooses the way another choose law or the church. An issue undergoes the arbitrament of arms."..."One does not bear arms against a rabbit ...".

Garry Wills also cites Greek and Latin etymology:

..."Bear Arms" refers to military service, which is why the plural is used (based on Greek 'hopla pherein' and Latin 'arma ferre') – one does not bear arm, or bear an arm. The word means, etymologically, 'equipment' (from the root ar-* in verbs like 'ararisko', to fit out). It refers to the 'equipage' of war. Thus 'bear arms' can be used of naval as well as artillery warfare, since the "profession of arms" refers to all military callings.

Historically, the right to keep and bear arms, whether considered an individual or a collective or a militia right, did not originate fully formed in the Bill of Rights in 1791; rather, the Second Amendment was the codification of the six-centuries-old responsibility to keep and bear arms for king and country that was inherited from the English Colonists who settled North America, tracing its origin back to the Assize of Arms of 1181 that occurred during the reign of Henry II. Through being codified in the United States Constitution, the common law right was continued and guaranteed for the People, and statutory law enacted subsequently by Congress cannot extinguish the pre-existing common law right to keep and bear arms.

The Second Amendment to the United States Constitution refers to a pre-existing right to keep and bear arms:

A well regulated Militia, being necessary to the security of a free State, the right of the people to keep and bear Arms, shall not be infringed.

The right is often presented in the United States as being an unenumerated, pre-existing right, such as provided for by the Ninth Amendment to the United States Constitution, interpreted by some as providing for unenumerated rights, and therefore implicitly a right to keep and bear arms:

The enumeration in the Constitution, of certain rights shall not be construed to deny or disparage others retained by the people.

Some have seen the Second Amendment as derivative of a common law right to keep and bear arms; Thomas B. McAffee & Michael J. Quinlan, writing in the North Carolina Law Review said "... Madison did not invent the right to keep and bear arms when he drafted the Second Amendment – the right was pre-existing at both common law and in the early state constitutions."

Akhil Reed Amar similarly notes the basis of Common Law for the first ten amendments of the U.S. Constitution, "following John Randolph Tucker's famous oral argument in the 1887 Chicago anarchist case, Spies v. Illinois":

Though originally the first ten Amendments were adopted as limitations on Federal power, yet insofar as they secure and recognize fundamental rights – common law rights – of the man, they make them privileges and immunities of the man as citizen of the United States ...

Uviller and Merkel hold that the right to bear arms was not reserved for the state, but rather was an individual and personal right for arms only to the extent needed to maintain a well regulated militia to support the state. They also hold that a militia recognizable to the framers of the Constitution has ceased to exist in the United States resulting from deliberate Congressional legislation and also societal neglect; nonetheless, "Technically, all males aged seventeen to forty-five are members of the unorganized militia, but that status has no practical legal significance."

A few academic writers published their opinions in several works:

From the text as well as a fair understanding of the contemporary ethic regarding arms and liberty, it seems to us overwhelmingly evident that the principal purpose of the Amendment was to secure a personal, individual entitlement to the possession and use of arms. We cannot, however, (as the individual rights contingent generally does) disregard entirely the first part of the text proclaiming a well regulated militia necessary to the security of a free state.

... we understand the Second Amendment as though it read: "Inasmuch as and so long as a well regulated Militia shall be necessary to the security of a free state and so long as privately held arms shall be essential to the maintenance thereof, the right of the people to keep and bear arms shall not be infringed." "..to us, the language of the Amendment cannot support a right to personal weaponry independent of the social value of a regulated organization of armed citizens.

== Early commentary in federal courts ==
In the century following the ratification of the Bill of Rights, the intended meaning and application of the Second Amendment drew less interest than it does today. The vast majority of regulation was done by states, and the first case law on weapons regulation dealt with state interpretations of the Second Amendment. A notable exception to this general rule was Houston v. Moore, 18 U.S. 1 (1820), where the Supreme Court mentioned the Second Amendment in an aside.

=== Dred Scott v. Sandford ===
In the Nineteenth century considerable attention in public discourse and the courts was directed to the issue of arming of slaves (prior to the Civil War), and later to the right of slaves to belong to militia and the arming of these individuals. Most famously this is seen in the court arguments of the 1857 court case Dred Scott v. Sandford, whether the slave Dred Scott could be a citizen with rights, including the right to bear arms. This debate about the rights of slaves and former slaves often included the usage of the term 'bear arms' with the meaning of individuals having or not having the right to possess firearms.

In the Dred Scott decision, the opinion of the court stated that if African Americans were considered U.S. citizens, "It would give to persons of the negro race, who were recognized as citizens in any one State of the Union, the right ... to keep and carry arms wherever they went."

== Early commentary in state courts ==
The Second Amendment of the United States Constitution is a federal provision. In 2010, this "fundamental" and "individual" right was "fully incorporated" with the 14th Amendment per the SCOTUS ruling made in McDonald v. City of Chicago, which upheld the prior opinion made in District of Columbia v. Heller. Each of the fifty states also has its own state constitution. Forty-four states have chosen to explicitly embody a right to bear arms into their state constitutions. Each of the state constitutions, state laws, and state courts addresses the state-based right to bear arms distinctly within its respective jurisdictions. The degree and the nature of the protection, prohibition, and regulation at the state level varies from state to state. The District of Columbia, not being a state, falls within the federal jurisdiction.

Approximately thirty-one states have explicitly chosen to include the right to arms for "individual right", "defense of self", "defense of home" or similarly worded reasons. Approximately thirteen states, as with the U.S. Constitution, did not choose to explicitly include "individual", "self" or "home" wording associated with a right to bear arms in their state constitutions.

Approximately twenty-eight states have explicitly chosen to include the right to bear arms for "security of a free state", "defense of state", "common defense" or similarly worded reasons, as with the U.S. Constitution. Approximately sixteen states did not choose to include explicitly "free state", "defense of state" or "common defense" wording for their specific state. Whether the inclusion of these kinds of wording in state constitutions has relevance to the issue of whether implicit "individual" rights exist, or whether such rights (if any) are implicitly protected by the states' constitutions or by the U.S. Constitution's Second Amendment, remains a matter of dispute. However, since the SCOTUS has "fully incorporated" the 2nd and 14th Amendments in their 2010 opinion and order in McDonald v. City of Chicago, the right to keep and bear arms is "fully applicable" to the states and limits the states on any and all regulations and restrictions they choose to take, and federal Constitutional rights take precedence over state, local and other laws that regulate to "Right of Lawful Citizens to keep and bear Arms for self-defense, a 'central component' of the 2nd Amendment" (see McDonald v. City of Chicago (SC 2010)).

Regarding the state interpretations of these states and the federal constitutional rights to bear arms, state courts have addressed the meaning of these specific rights in considerable detail. Two different models have emerged from state jurisprudence: an individual right (defense of self or home) and a collective (defense of the state) right. The states cannot lessen or restrict any Bill of Rights guarantee that has been "fully incorporated" (American jurisprudence) and that the right is "fully incorporated" also applies to the respective State Constitutions; again, the states can only "add to" these rights but can never "diminish" these rights by state and local laws.

=== Bliss ===
Bliss v. Commonwealth (1822, KY) addressed the right to bear arms pursuant to Art. 10, Sec. 23 of the Second Constitution of Kentucky (1799): "That the rights of the citizens to bear arms in defense of themselves and the State shall not be questioned." This was interpreted to include the right to carry a concealed sword in a cane. This case has been described as about "a statute prohibiting the carrying of concealed weapons [that] was violative of the Second Amendment." Others, however, have seen no conflict with the Second Amendment by the Commonwealth of Kentucky's statute under consideration in Bliss since "The Kentucky law was aimed at concealed weapons. No one saw any conflict with the Second Amendment. As a matter of fact, most of the few people who considered the question at all believed amendments to the U.S. Constitution did not apply to state laws."

The Kentucky High Court stated in Bliss, "But it should not be forgotten, that it is not only a part of the right that is secured by the constitution; it is the right entire and complete, as it existed at the adoption of the constitution; and if any portion of that right be impaired, immaterial how small the part may be, and immaterial the order of time at which it be done, it is equally forbidden by the constitution." The "constitution" mentioned in this quote refers to Kentucky's Constitution.

The case prompted outrage in the Kentucky House, all the while recognizing that Section 23 of the Second Constitution of Kentucky (1799) did guarantee individuals the right to bear arms. The Bliss ruling, to the extent that it dealt with concealed weapons, was overturned by constitutional amendment with Section 26 in Kentucky's Third Constitution (1850) banning the future carrying of concealed weapons, while still asserting that the bearing of arms in defense of themselves and the state was an individual and collective right in the Commonwealth of Kentucky. This recognition has remained to the present day in the Commonwealth of Kentucky's Fourth Constitution, enacted in 1891, in Section 1, Article 7, that guarantees "The right to bear arms in defense of themselves and of the State, subject to the power of the General Assembly to enact laws to prevent persons from carrying concealed weapons." As noted in the Northern Kentucky Law Review Second Amendment Symposium: Rights in Conflict in the 1980s, vol. 10, no. 1, 1982, p. 155, "The first state court decision resulting from the "right to bear arms" issue was Bliss v. Commonwealth. The court held that "the right of citizens to bear arms in defense of themselves and the State must be preserved entire, ..." "This holding was unique because it stated that the right to bear arms is absolute and unqualified."

The importance of Bliss is also seen from the defense subsequently given against a murder charge in Kentucky against Mattews Ward, who in 1852 pulled out a concealed pistol and fatally wounded his brother's teacher over an accusation regarding eating chestnuts in class. Ward's defense team consisted of eighteen lawyers, including U.S. Senator John Crittenden, former Governor of Kentucky, and former United States Attorney General. The defense successfully defended Ward in 1854 through an assertion that "a man has a right to carry arms; I am aware of nothing in the laws of God or man, prohibiting it. The Constitution of Kentucky and our Bill of Rights guarantee it. The Legislature once passed an act forbidding it, but it was decided unconstitutional, and overruled by our highest tribunal, the Court of Appeals." As noted by Cornell, "Ward's lawyers took advantage of the doctrine advanced in Bliss and wrapped their client's action under the banner of a constitutional right to bear arms. Ward was acquitted."

=== Aymette ===
In Aymette v. State, 21 Tenn. 154, 156 (1840), the Tennessee Supreme Court construed the guarantee in Tennessee's 1834 Constitution that 'the free white men of this State have a right to Keep and bear arms for their common defence.' Explaining that the provision was adopted with the same goals as the Federal Constitution's Second Amendment, the court wrote: "The words 'bear arms' ... have reference to their military use, and were not employed to mean wearing them about the person as part of the dress. As the object for which the right to keep and bear arms is secured, is of general and public nature, to be exercised by the people in a body, for their common defense, so the arms, the right to keep which is secured, are such as are usually employed in civilized warfare, and that constitute the ordinary military equipment."

1. The act of 1837–38, ch. 137, sec. 2, which prohibits any person from wearing any Bowie knife, or Arkansas toothpick, or other knife or weapon in form, shape or size resembling a Bowie knife or Arkansas toothpick under his clothes, or concealed about his person, does not conflict with the 26th section of the first article of the bill of rights, securing to the free white citizens the right to keep and bear arms for their common defense.
2. The arms, the right to keep and bear which is secured by the constitution, are such as are usually employed in civilized warfare, and constitute the ordinary military equipment; the legislature have the power to prohibit the keeping or wearing weapons dangerous to the peace and safety of the citizens, and which are not usual in civilized warfare.
3. The right to keep and bear arms for the common defense, is a great political right. It respects the citizens on the one hand, and the rulers on the other; and although this right must be inviolably preserved, it does not follow that the legislature is prohibited from passing laws regulating the manner in which these arms may be employed.

=== Nunn ===
The Georgia Supreme Court ruled in Nunn v. Georgia (Nunn v. State, 1 Ga. (1 Kel.) 243 (1846)) that a state law banning handguns was an unconstitutional violation of the Second Amendment. This was the first gun control measure to be overturned on Second Amendment grounds. The Supreme Court in its ruling in District of Columbia v. Heller said Nunn "perfectly captured the way in which the operative clause of the Second Amendment furthers the purpose announced in the prefatory clause."

The right of the whole people, old and young, men, women and boys, and not militia only, to keep and bear arms of every description, and not such merely as are used by the militia, shall not be infringed, curtailed, or broken in upon, in the smallest degree; and all this for the important end to be attained: the rearing up and qualifying a well-regulated militia, so vitally necessary to the security of a free State. Our opinion is, that any law, State or Federal, is repugnant to the Constitution, and void, which contravenes this right, originally belonging to our forefathers, trampled under foot by Charles I. and his two wicked sons and successors, re-established by the revolution of 1688, conveyed to this land of liberty by the colonists, and finally incorporated conspicuously in our own Magna Charta!

=== Buzzard ===
In State v. Buzzard (1842, Ark), the Arkansas high court adopted a militia-based, political interpretation, reading of the right to bear arms under state law, and upheld the 21st section of the second article of the Arkansas Constitution that declared, "that the free white men of this State shall have a right to keep and bear arms for their common defense", while rejecting a challenge to a statute prohibiting the carrying of concealed weapons. Buzzard had carried a concealed weapon and stood "indicted by virtue of the authority of the 13th section of an act of the Legislature prohibiting any person wearing a pistol, dirk, large knife or sword-cane concealed as a weapon, unless upon a journey, under the penalties of fine and imprisonment." Justice Lacy, in a dissenting opinion in Buzzard, summarizing the majority viewpoint to which he disagreed, declared:

That the words "a well regulated militia being necessary for the security of a free State", and the words "common defense" clearly show the true intent and meaning of these Constitutions [i.e., Ark. and U.S.] and prove that it is a political and not an individual right, and, of course, that the State, in her legislative capacity, has the right to regulate and control it: This being the case, then the people, neither individually nor collectively, have the right to keep and bear arms."

Joel Prentiss Bishop's influential Commentaries on the Law of Statutory Crimes (1873) took Buzzard's militia-based interpretation, a view that Bishop characterized as the "Arkansas doctrine", as the orthodox view of the right to bear arms in American law.

Political scientist Earl Kruschke has categorized both Bliss and Buzzard as being "cases illustrating the individual view." Professor Eugene Volokh revealed, in the California Political Review, that a statement in a concurring opinion in Buzzard was the only support for a collective right view of the right to keep and bear arms in the 19th century.

=== Salina v. Blaksley ===
In 1905, the Kansas Supreme Court in Salina v. Blaksley made the first collective right judicial interpretation. The Kansas high court declared: "That the provision in question applies only to the right to bear arms as a member of the state militia, or some other military organization provided for by law, is also apparent from the second amendment to the federal Constitution, which says: 'A well regulated militia, being necessary to the security of a free state, the right of the people to keep and bear arms shall not be infringed.'"

== Modern commentary ==
=== Interpretive models ===
Three models of interpreting the right to bear arms in the United States commonly exist. These three models are founded on differing interpretations of the Second Amendment, "A well regulated Militia, being necessary to the security of a free State, the right of the people to keep and bear arms, shall not be infringed."

The first model, the individual-rights model, holds that a right of individuals is to own and possess firearms, much as the First Amendment protects a right of individuals to engage in free speech. This view was confirmed by the Supreme Court in District of Columbia v. Heller (2008) had previous interpretations by the Court. Prior to the Supreme Court's ruling in Heller there was a split among the federal courts, with nine of the federal circuit courts of appeal supporting a modified collective rights view, two of the federal circuits supporting an individual rights view, and one federal circuit court having not addressed the question.

The second two models focus on the preamble, or "purpose" clause, of the Amendment – the words "A well regulated Militia, being necessary to the security of a free State." The second model, the collective model, holds that the right to bear arms belongs to the people collectively rather than to individuals, under the belief that the right's only purpose is to enable states to maintain a militia.

The third model, the modified collective model, holds that the right to keep and bear arms exists only for individuals actively serving in the militia, and then only pursuant to such regulations as may be prescribed.

=== Federal case commentary ===
Supreme Court justice Antonin Scalia in 2008 wrote that the right to bear arms is not unlimited and is subject to reasonable prohibitions and regulations and subsequently federal court rulings have upheld existing gun prohibitions and regulations.

Nadine Strossen, former president of the American Civil Liberties Union, has stated that the individual rights model must yield to reasonable regulation. Strossen said "it is no more absolute than freedom of speech or any other right in the Constitution. No right is absolute; the government is always allowed to restrict the right if it can satisfy Constitutional strict scrutiny and show the restriction is narrowly tailored to promote a goal of compelling importance."

In October 2001, the United States Court of Appeals for the Fifth Circuit stated:

there are numerous instances of the phrase 'bear arms' being used to describe a civilian's carrying of arms. Early constitutional provisions or declarations of rights in at least some ten different states speak of the right of the 'people' [or 'citizen' or 'citizens'] "to bear arms in defense of themselves [or 'himself'] and the state,' or equivalent words, thus indisputably reflecting that under common usage 'bear arms' was in no sense restricted to bearing arms in military service."

==== United States v. Miller ====
In United States v. Miller, 307 U.S. 174 (1939), the Supreme Court rejected a Second Amendment challenge to the National Firearms Act prohibiting the interstate transportation of unregistered Title II weapons:

Jack Miller and Frank Layton "did unlawfully ... transport in interstate commerce from ... Claremore ... Oklahoma to ... Siloam Springs ... Arkansas a certain firearm ... a double barrel ... shotgun having a barrel less than 18 inches in length ... at the time of so transporting said firearm in interstate commerce ... not having registered said firearm as required by Section 1132d of Title 26, United States Code, ... and not having in their possession a stamp-affixed written order ... as provided by Section 1132C ...

In a unanimous opinion authored by Justice McReynolds, the Supreme Court stated "the objection that the Act usurps police power reserved to the States is plainly untenable." As the Court explained:

In the absence of any evidence tending to show that possession or use of a 'shotgun having a barrel of less than eighteen inches in length' at this time has some reasonable relationship to any preservation or efficiency of a well regulated militia, we cannot say that the Second Amendment guarantees the right to keep and bear such an instrument. Certainly it is not within judicial notice that this weapon is any part of the ordinary military equipment or that its use could contribute to the common defense.

Gun rights advocates claim that the Court in Miller ruled that the Second Amendment protected the right to keep arms that are part of "ordinary military equipment." They also claim that the Court did not consider the question of whether the sawed-off shotgun in the case would be an applicable weapon for personal defense, instead looking solely at the weapon's suitability for the "common defense." Law professor Andrew McClurg states, "The only certainty about Miller is that it failed to give either side a clear-cut victory. Most modern scholars recognize this fact."

==== District of Columbia v. Heller ====
According to the syllabus prepared by the U.S. Supreme Court Reporter of Decisions, in District of Columbia v. Heller, 554 U.S. 570 (2008), the Supreme Court held that the Second Amendment protects an individual right to possess a firearm unconnected with service in a militia, and to use that arm for traditionally lawful purposes, such as self-defense within the home. pp. 2–53.

Other legal summaries of the court's findings in this case are similar.

==== McDonald v. Chicago ====
On June 28, 2010, the Supreme Court in McDonald v. Chicago, 561 U.S. 3025 (2010) held that the Second Amendment was fully incorporated within the 14th Amendment. This means that the court ruled that the Second Amendment limits state and local governments to the same extent that it limits the federal government. It also remanded a case regarding a Chicago handgun prohibition. Four of the five Justices in the majority voted to do so by way of the Due Process Clause of the Fourteenth Amendment, while the fifth Justice, Clarence Thomas, voted to do so through the amendment's Privileges or Immunities Clause.

==== Caetano v. Massachusetts ====
On March 21, 2016, the Supreme Court in Caetano v. Massachusetts 577 U.S. 411 (2016) ruled that the Second Amendment applied to all instruments of bearable arms. The Massachusetts ruling upholding the law was vacated and the case remanded. As a result, a Massachusetts woman was exonerated for possession of a stun gun which was illegal under Massachusetts law. Similar laws were subsequently ended in New Jersey and Washington D.C. after lawsuits as a result of the Supreme Court's ruling.

==== New York State Rifle & Pistol Association v. Bruen ====
On November 3, 2021, the Supreme Court in New York State Rifle & Pistol Association v. Bruen (NYSRPA v. Bruen) 597 U.S. 1 (2022) found in a 6-3 decision that Americans have a constitutional right to carry guns in public. Clarence Thomas stated Americans have a two part right to "keep" guns in their homes and "bear" them in public. It held that the "may issue" standard for concealed carry permits overly stringent. The opinion further instructed lower courts to look at historical precedent in the country's founding and Bill of Rights (1791–1868) to determine the constitutionality of a gun regulation.

== The politics of the right to keep and bear arms ==
U.S. opinion on gun control issues is deeply divided along political lines, as shown in this 2021 survey.

The political party that advocates most for gun rights is the Libertarian Party, who believe gun rights is a natural right for everyone. They are followed by the Republican Party, which advocates for gun rights, but support gun control measures, like red flag laws, and prohibition of certain individuals from owning guns. The Democratic Party advocates for the most gun control measures historically. Interest groups, primarily in the United States, exert political pressure for and against legislation limiting the right to keep and bear arms. This political debate in the United States is organized between those who seek stricter regulations and those who believe gun regulations violate the Second Amendment protection of a right to keep and bear arms. The largest advocacy group in this regard is the National Rifle Association of America (NRA), and its political wing the NRA Institute for Legislative Action, aside from the Libertarian Party which advocates gun rights for everyone in their political platform. Several other groups including the Gun Owners of America and the Citizens Committee for the Right to Keep and Bear Arms, while smaller in size, are also politically active. Gun control advocacy groups include the Brady Campaign and Everytown for Gun Safety, which are increasingly gaining political clout and spending power.

There are also socialist gun rights groups, including the Socialist Rifle Association and Redneck Revolt.

== Public opinion ==
=== 2024-2025 ===
According to Gallup and John Hopkins polls from 2024 and 2025 Americans support for gun control is strong in many cases but varied in other instances.

- 56% of Americans support stronger restrictions on firearms sales in general;
- 20% of Americans support an outright ban on the possession of handguns;
- 52% support a ban on the manufacture, possession and sale of semiautomatic rifles;
- 74% of support safe storage laws;
- 72% support requiring a license a to purchase a firearm;
- 77% of Americans signaled their support red flag laws.

== See also ==
- 2nd Amendment Day
- American gun ownership
- Firearms regulation in the United Kingdom
- Gun laws in the United States by state
- Gun politics
- Index of gun politics articles
- Overview of gun laws by nation
- Right of self-defense
- Second Amendment sanctuary
