= List of firearm court cases in the United States =

Collection of rulings by federal courts regarding the ownership of firearms

Firearm case law in the United States is based on decisions of the Supreme Court and other federal courts. Each of these decisions deals with the Second Amendment (which is a part of the Bill of Rights), the right to keep and bear arms, the Commerce Clause, the General Welfare Clause, and/or other federal firearms laws.

== United States Supreme Court cases ==
The Supreme Court has occasionally interpreted the Second Amendment and has also mentioned the Second Amendment when ruling on other legal matters.

=== Interpreting the Second Amendment ===
- United States v. Cruikshank, 92 U.S. 542 (1876) - post Civil War era case relating to the Ku Klux Klan depriving freed slaves basic rights such as freedom of assembly and the right to bear arms. The court ruled the application of the First and Second Amendments "was not intended to limit the powers of the State governments in respect to their own citizens" and "has no other effect than to restrict the powers of the national government," respectively. In summary, it ruled the federal government could not file charges against citizens in federal court regarding violations of other citizens' constitutional rights. It was up to the states to protect the fundamental rights of its citizens when their rights were abridged by other citizens.

The Court also noted that the Second Amendment only restrained the government from regulating gun ownership, not other private citizens:

The second amendment declares that it shall not be infringed, but this, as has been seen, means no more than that it shall not be infringed by congress. This is one of the amendments that has no other effect than to restrict the powers of the national government, leaving the people to look for their protection against any violation by their fellow-citizens of the rights it recognizes to what is called in City of New York v. Miln, 11 Pet. [116 U.S. 252, 102] 139, the 'powers which relate to merely municipal legislation, or what was perhaps more properly called internal police,' 'not surrendered or restrained' by the constitution of the United States.

- Presser v. Illinois, 116 U.S. 252 (1886) - This second post-Civil War era case related to the meaning of the Second Amendment rights relating to militias and individuals. The court ruled the Second Amendment right was a right of individuals related to belonging to a militia, for the good of the United States. The Court stated that there is a limit upon state restriction of firearms ownership in that they may not disarm the people to such an extent that there is no remaining armed militia force for the general government to call upon:
  It is undoubtedly true that all citizens capable of bearing arms constitute the reserved military force or reserve militia of the United States as well as of the States, and in view of this prerogative of the general government, as well as of its general powers, the States cannot, even laying the constitutional provision in question out of view, prohibit the people from keeping and bearing arms, so as to deprive the United States of their rightful resource for maintaining the public security, and disable the people from performing their duty to the general government. But, as already stated, we think it clear that the sections under consideration do not have this effect.
- United States v. Miller, 307 U.S. 174 (1939) - The Court stated in part:

In the absence of any evidence tending to show that possession or use of a "shotgun having a barrel of less than eighteen inches in length" at this time has some reasonable relationship to the preservation or efficiency of a well regulated militia, we cannot say that the Second Amendment guarantees the right to keep and bear such an instrument. Certainly it is not within judicial notice that this weapon is any part of the ordinary military equipment, or that its use could contribute to the common defense. Aymette v. State, 2 Humphreys (Tenn.) 154, 158. The signification attributed to the term Militia appears from the debates in the Convention, the history and legislation of Colonies and States, and the writings of approved commentators. These show plainly enough that the Militia comprised all males physically capable of acting in concert for the common defense. 'A body of citizens enrolled for military discipline.' And further, that ordinarily when called for service these men were expected to appear bearing arms supplied by themselves and of the kind in common use at the time.

- District of Columbia v. Heller, 554 U.S. 570 (2008) - The Court ruled the Second Amendment to reference an individual right, holding:

The Second Amendment guarantees an individual right to possess a firearm unconnected with service in a militia, and to use that arm for traditionally lawful purposes, such as self-defense within the home.

- McDonald v. City of Chicago, 561 U.S. 742 (2010) - The Court ruled that the Second Amendment was incorporated against state and local governments, through the Due Process Clause of the Fourteenth Amendment.

In the decision, the Court said:

In Heller, we held that the Second Amendment protects the right to possess a handgun in the home for the purpose of self-defense. Unless considerations of stare decisis counsel otherwise, a provision of the Bill of Rights that protects a right that is fundamental from an American perspective applies equally to the Federal Government and the States. We therefore hold that the Due Process Clause of the Fourteenth Amendment incorporates the Second Amendment right recognized in Heller.

- Caetano v. Massachusetts, 577 U.S. 411 (2016) (per curiam) - The Court ruled that the Second Amendment extends to all forms of bearable arms:

The Court has held that the Second Amendment extends, prima facie, to all instruments that constitute bearable arms, even those that were not in existence at the time of the founding, and that this Second Amendment right is fully applicable to the States.

- New York State Rifle & Pistol Association, Inc. v. Bruen, No. 20-843, 597 U.S. 1 (2022) - In a 6–3 decision, the majority ruled that New York's law was unconstitutional, and effectively ruled that the possession of pistols in public was a constitutional right under the Second Amendment. State licensing of firearms was not declared an infringement on that right as long as states stay within the much more common "shall-issue" systems, which may only condition licenses upon satisfying objective criteria, such as passing a background check, rather than "may-issue" systems which may be based on arbitrary evaluations of need made by local authorities. The court also created a new standard for assessing the constitutionality of gun laws, requiring that they be consistent with the nations “historical tradition of firearm regulation”. This standard had a significant impact on case law, rendering many existing firearms restrictions unconstitutional and resulting in a large increase in litigation over Second Amendment related issues.
- United States v. Rahimi, No. 22-915, 602 U.S. ---- (2024) - In an 8–1 decision, the majority ruled that 18 U.S.C. § 922(g)(8) could be constitutionally applied in at least some cases. Thus, in the majority's opinion, the Fifth Circuit erred under the "no set of circumstances test" set forth in United States v. Salerno, 481 U.S. 739, 107 S.Ct. 2095 (1987) when it held the statute to be facially unconstitutional. Justice Thomas was the sole dissenter, arguing that 18 U.S.C. § 922(g)(8) could never be applied constitutionally because the statute is wholly inconsistent with the history-and-tradition test set forth in Bruen. Notably, Justice Thomas was the one who wrote the Bruen majority opinion.

=== Mentioning the Second Amendment ===
- Dred Scott v. Sandford, 60 U.S. 393 (1857) - The court ruled Scott did not enjoy the protection of the Bill of Rights because of his racial background. However, in its ruling, it implies all free men do have the right to bear arms by indicating what would happen if he was indeed afforded full protection:

It would give to persons of the negro race, ... the right to enter every other State whenever they pleased, ... the full liberty of speech in public and in private upon all subjects upon which its own citizens might speak; to hold public meetings upon political affairs, and to keep and carry arms wherever they went.

- Duncan v. Louisiana, 391 U.S. 145 (1968) - A Supreme Court case which incorporated the Sixth Amendment right to a jury trial at the state level as required by the Fourteenth Amendment. In a concurring opinion by Justice Hugo Black, he used a statement by Senator Howard, who introduced the Fourteenth Amendment, to help validate the Court's ruling that the Bill of Rights as a result of the Fourteenth Amendment forces states, and not just the federal government, to protect the same individual rights enumerated in the Bill of Rights:

Such is the character of the privileges and immunities spoken of in the second section of the fourth article of the Constitution ... the personal rights guarantied and secured by the first eight amendments of the Constitution; such as the freedom of speech and of the press; the right of the people peaceably to assemble and petition the Government for a redress of grievances, a right appertaining to each and all the people; the right to keep and to bear arms ...

- Lewis v. United States, 445 U.S. 55 (1980) - Ruling that the Congress may prohibit felons from possessing firearms:

This Court has recognized repeatedly that a legislature constitutionally may prohibit a convicted felon from engaging in activities far more fundamental than the possession of a firearm. ... These legislative restrictions on the use of firearms are neither based upon constitutionally suspect criteria nor do they trench upon any constitutionally protected liberties. See United States v. Miller, 307 U. S. 174, 307 U. S. 178 (1939) (the Second Amendment guarantees no right to keep and bear a firearm that does not have "some reasonable relationship to the preservation or efficiency of a well regulated militia")

- United States v. Verdugo-Urquidez 494 U.S. 259 (1990) - A case dealing with nonresident aliens and the Fourth Amendment, but led to a discussion of who are "the People" when referred to in the Constitution:

[T]he people' seems to have been a term of art employed in select parts of the Constitution. The Preamble declares that the Constitution is ordained and established by 'the people of the United States.' The Second Amendment protects 'the right of the people to keep and bear Arms,' and the Ninth and Tenth Amendments provide that certain rights and powers are retained by and reserved to 'the people.' See also U.S. Const., Amdt. 1 ('Congress shall make no law ... abridging ... the right of the people peaceably to assemble') (emphasis added); Art. I, 2, cl. 1 ('The House of Representatives shall be composed of Members chosen every second Year by the people of the several States') (emphasis added). While this textual exegesis is by no means conclusive, it suggests that 'the people' protected by the Fourth Amendment, and by the First and Second Amendments, and to whom rights and powers are reserved in the Ninth and Tenth Amendments, refers to a class of persons who are part of a national community or who have otherwise developed sufficient connection with this country to be considered part of that community.

- New York State Rifle & Pistol Association, Inc. v. City of New York, No. 18-280, 590 U.S. ___ (2020) (per curiam) - This case regarded a New York City law that forbade the transfer of unloaded and locked firearms from one's residence to anywhere other than one of seven shooting ranges within the city. After the Court agreed to hear the case, New York City and New York State amended their laws which effectively eliminated the restrictions previously in place. In April 2020, the Court determined that the case was moot and sent the case back to lower courts to determine "whether petitioners may still add a claim for damages in this lawsuit with respect to New York City's old rule."

== Federal court rulings ==
- Cases v. United States (1st Cir. 1942) was the next federal Second Amendment case after Miller. The opinion upheld the conviction concluding that "there is no evidence that the appellant was or ever had been a member of any military organization or that his use of the weapon under the circumstances disclosed was in preparation for a military career." The court established the federal precedent of restricting the Second Amendment to citizens themselves having a connection to militia. It described as "outdated" the Supreme Court's conclusion in Miller that it is the weapons which must have such a connection.
- United States v. Warin (6th Cir. 1976) brought earlier formulations of the concept to the first explicit mention of a collective Second Amendment right in a federal court opinion, stating "It is clear that the Second Amendment guarantees a collective rather than an individual right."

== Firearm Owners Protection Act court rulings ==
- Farmer v. Higgins (11th Cir. 1990) - United States Court of Appeals for the Eleventh Circuit ruling ATF does not need to register new machine guns for private ownership under the exception of 18 USC 922(o)(A)(1).
- United States v. Warner (10th Cir. 1993) - United States Court of Appeals for the Tenth Circuit ruling regarding Mr. Warner, who was caught in Utah with a machine gun and convicted on 922(o), possession of a machine gun. Mr. Warner appealed on the basis the Utah constitution allows its citizens to bear arms, and therefore he is exempt based on 922(o)(2)(A), "under authority of the State." However, the court overruled this, citing the Farmer case saying machine guns were not meant to be in private hands, and although the Utah law gives permission to own automatic firearms, it did not grant him authority.
- United States v. Rock Island Armory (1991) - United States District Court for the Central District of Illinois ruling one cannot be prosecuted for 1934 National Firearms Act violations for machine guns produced after 1986:

... since enactment of 18 U.S.C. § 922(o), the Secretary has refused to accept any tax payments to make or transfer a machine gun made after May 19, 1986, to approve any such making or transfer, or to register any such machine gun. As applied to machine guns made and possessed after May 19, 1986, the registration and other requirements of the National Firearms Act, Chapter 53 of the Internal Revenue Code, no longer serve any revenue purpose, and are impliedly repealed or are unconstitutional.

== Commerce Clause challenges to firearm laws ==
- Stevens v. United States, (6th Cir. 1971) - Upheld enforcement of the Omnibus Crime Control and Safe Streets Act of 1968 under the Commerce Clause for a felon found in possession of a pistol. This case also furthered the collective rights theory of the Second Amendment established in Cases, stating "Since the Second Amendment right 'to keep and bear Arms' applies only to the right of the State to maintain a militia and not to the individual's right to bear arms, there can be no serious claim to any express constitutional right of an individual to possess a firearm."
- United States v. Lopez, 514 U.S. 549 (1995) - In the first Supreme Court case, since the New Deal, to set limits on the Congress's power under the Commerce Clause, the Court declared the Gun-Free School Zones Act of 1990 unconstitutional.
- United States v. Rybar (3d Cir. 1996) - In this case, the United States Court of Appeals for the Third Circuit ruled Congress did have the power to regulate possession of homemade machine guns under the Commerce Clause, later reaffirmed by the Supreme Court. The Third Circuit made this decision 2–1, with future Supreme Court Justice Samuel Alito in dissent.
- United States v. Kirk (5th Cir. 1997) - Here, the United States Court of Appeals for the Fifth Circuit considered whether Congress overstepped the bounds of the Commerce Clause in banning simple possession of a machinegun (18 U.S.C. §922(o)), absent any transfer over state lines. The en banc panel was evenly split 8-8, and so upheld the previous conviction.
- United States v. Stewart (348 F.3d 1132 (2003) and 451 F.3d 1071 (2006)) - In 2003, the United States Court of Appeals for the Ninth Circuit struck down Stewart's conviction on a charge of possession of an unregistered machinegun (18 U.S.C. §922(o)) on Commerce Clause grounds. Following the Supreme Court's decision in Gonzales v. Raich, the Court ordered Stewart remanded to the Ninth Circuit for further consideration in light of the decision in Raich. The Ninth Circuit then upheld Stewart's conviction, concluding :

We therefore hold that Congress had a rational basis for concluding that in the aggregate, possession of homemade machineguns could substantially affect interstate commerce in machineguns.

== State courts ==
=== Bliss v. Commonwealth ===
Bliss v. Commonwealth, 12 Ky. 90 (1822) addressed the right to bear arms pursuant to Art. 10, Sec. 23 of the Second Constitution of Kentucky (1799): "That the right of the citizens to bear arms in defence of themselves and the state, shall not be questioned." This was interpreted to include the right to carry a concealed sword in a cane. Bliss has been described as about "a statute prohibiting the carrying of concealed weapons [that] was violative of the Second Amendment." Others, however, have seen no conflict with the Second Amendment by the Commonwealth of Kentucky's statute under consideration in Bliss since "[t]he Kentucky law was aimed at concealed weapons. No one saw any conflict with the Second Amendment. As a matter of fact, most of the few people who considered the question at all believed amendments to the U.S. Constitution did not apply to state laws."

Bliss stated, "But it should not be forgotten, that it is not only a part of the right that is secured by the constitution; it is the right entire and complete, as it existed at the adoption of the constitution; and if any portion of that right be impaired, immaterial how small the part may be, and immaterial the order of time at which it be done, it is equally forbidden by the [Kentucky] constitution."

The case prompted outrage in the Kentucky House, all the while recognizing that Section 23 of the Second Constitution of Kentucky (1799) did guarantee individuals the right to bear arms. The Bliss ruling, to the extent that it dealt with concealed weapons, was overturned by constitutional amendment with Section 26 in Kentucky's Third Constitution (1850) banning the future carrying of concealed weapons, while still asserting that the bearing of arms in defense of themselves and the state was an individual and collective right in the Commonwealth of Kentucky. This recognition, has remained to the present day in the Commonwealth of Kentucky's Fourth Constitution enacted in 1891, in Section 1, Article 7, that guarantees "The right to bear arms in defense of themselves and of the State, subject to the power of the General Assembly to enact laws to prevent persons from carrying concealed weapons." As noted in the Northern Kentucky Law Review Second Amendment Symposium: Rights in Conflict in the 1980s, vol. 10, no. 1, 1982, p. 155, "The first state court decision resulting from the "right to bear arms" issue was Bliss v. Commonwealth. The court held that "the right of citizens to bear arms in defense of themselves and the State must be preserved entire, ..." "This holding was unique because it stated that the right to bear arms is absolute and unqualified."

The importance of Bliss is also seen from the defense subsequently given against a murder charge in Kentucky against Mattews Ward, who in 1852 pulled out a concealed pistol and fatally wounded his brother's teacher over an accusation regarding eating chestnuts in class. Ward's defense team consisted of eighteen lawyers, including U.S. Senator John Crittenden, former Governor of Kentucky, and former United States Attorney General. The defense successfully defended Ward in 1854 through an assertion that "a man has a right to carry arms; I am aware of nothing in the laws of God or man, prohibiting it. The Constitution of Kentucky and our Bill of Rights guarantee it. The Legislature once passed an act forbidding it, but it was decided unconstitutional, and overruled by our highest tribunal, the Court of Appeals." As noted by Cornell, "Ward's lawyers took advantage of the doctrine advanced in Bliss and wrapped their client's action under the banner of a constitutional right to bear arms. Ward was acquitted."

=== Aymette v. State ===
In Aymette v. State, 21 Tenn. 154, 156 (1840), the Tennessee Supreme Court construed the guarantee in Tennessee's 1834 Constitution that " 'the free white men of this State, have a right to keep and bear arms for their common defence.' " Explaining that the provision was adopted with the same goals as the Federal Constitution's Second Amendment, the court wrote: "The words 'bear arms' ... have reference to their military use, and were not employed to mean wearing them about the person as part of the dress. As the object for which the right to keep and bear arms is secured, is of general and public nature, to be exercised by the people in a body, for their common defence, so the arms, the right to keep which is secured, are such as are usually employed in civilized warfare, and that constitute the ordinary military equipment."

1. The act of 1837–8, ch. 137, sec. 2, which prohibits any person from wearing any bowie knife, or Arkansas tooth-pick, or other knife or weapon in form, shape or size resembling a bowie knife or Arkansas tooth-pick under his clothes, or concealed about his person, does not conflict with the 26th section of the first article of the bill of rights, securing to the free white citizens the right to keep and bear arms for their common defence.
2. The arms, the right to keep and bear which is secured by the constitution, are such as are usually employed in civilized warfare, and constitute the ordinary military equipment; the legislature have the power to prohibit the keeping or wearing weapons dangerous to the peace and safety of the citizens, and which are not usual in civilized warfare.
3. The right to keep and bear arms for the common defense, is a great political right. It respects the citizens on the one hand, and the rulers on the other; and although this right must be inviolably preserved, it does not follow that the legislature is prohibited from passing laws regulating the manner in which these arms may be employed.

=== Nunn v. Georgia ===
The Georgia Supreme Court ruled in Nunn v. Georgia (1 Ga. (1 Kel.) 243 (1846)) that a state law ban on handguns was unconstitutional under the Second Amendment. This was the first gun control measure to be overturned on Second Amendment grounds. In District of Columbia v. Heller (2008), the U.S. Supreme Court said Nunn, "Perfectly captured the way in which the operative clause of the Second Amendment furthered the purpose announced in the prefatory clause."

The right of the whole people, old and young, men, women and boys, and not militia only, to keep and bear arms of every description, and not such merely as are used by the militia, shall not be infringed, curtailed, or broken in upon, in the smallest degree; and all this for the important end to be attained: the rearing up and qualifying a well-regulated militia, so vitally necessary to the security of a free State. Our opinion is, that any law, State or Federal, is repugnant to the Constitution, and void, which contravenes this right, originally belonging to our forefathers, trampled under foot by Charles I. and his two wicked sons and successors, re-established by the revolution of 1688, conveyed to this land of liberty by the colonists, and finally incorporated conspicuously in our own Magna Carta!

=== State v. Buzzard ===
In contrast, in State v. Buzzard (1842 Ark.), the Arkansas Supreme Court adopted a militia-based, political right, reading of the right to bear arms under state law, and upheld the 21st section of the second article of the Arkansas Constitution that declared, "that the free white men of this State shall have a right to keep and bear arms for their common defense", while rejecting a challenge to a statute prohibiting the carrying of concealed weapons. Buzzard had carried a concealed weapon and stood "indicted by virtue of the authority of the 13th section of an act of the Legislature prohibiting any person wearing a pistol, dirk, large knife or sword-cane concealed as a weapon, unless upon a journey, under the penalties of fine and imprisonment." Justice Lacy, in a dissenting opinion in Buzzard, summarizing the majority viewpoint to which he disagreed, declared:

That the words "a well regulated militia being necessary for the security of a free State", and the words "common defense" clearly show the true intent and meaning of these Constitutions [i.e., Ark. and U.S.] and prove that it is a political and not an individual right, and, of course, that the State, in her legislative capacity, has the right to regulate and control it: This being the case, then the people, neither individually nor collectively, have the right to keep and bear arms.

Joel Prentiss Bishop's influential Commentaries on the Law of Statutory Crimes (1873) took Buzzard's militia-based interpretation, a view that Bishop characterized as the "Arkansas doctrine" (that the State may regulate the manner in which arms are carried), as the orthodox view of the right to bear arms in American law.

Political scientist Earl Kruschke has categorized both Bliss and Buzzard as being "cases illustrating the individual view." Professor Eugene Volokh revealed, in the California Political Review, that a statement in a concurring opinion in Buzzard was the only support for a collective right view of the right to keep and bear arms in the 19th century.

=== Wilson v. State of Arkansas ===
In Wilson v. State of Arkansas (1878 Ark.), the Arkansas Supreme Court dealt with a conviction arising under an Arkansas state law which prohibited a person from carrying a pistol except upon his own premises or when on a journey, or when acting as or in aid of an officer, the same law addressed in the Buzzard decision of 1848.

At trial, Wilson was indicted and convicted of the act, and appealed to the state supreme court. The court reversed the trial court's decision citing an array of state decisions which permitted the state to regulate the manner of carrying a concealed weapon, but that the law at issue restricting such action to one's own premises, while on a journey, or when acting in aid of an officer was constitutionally invalid. The Wilson decision effectively overturned the prior holding in Buzzard. The opinion, authored by Chief Justice English, included the following assertion:

No doubt in time of peace, persons might be prohibited from wearing war arms to places of public worship, or elections, etc. But to prohibit the citizen from wearing or carrying a war arm, except upon his own premises or when on a journey traveling through the country with baggage, or when acting as or in aid of an officer, is an unwarranted restriction upon his constitutional right to keep and bear arms. If cowardly and dishonorable men sometimes shoot unarmed men with army pistols or guns, the evil must be prevented by the penitentiary and gallows, and not by a general deprivation of a constitutional privilege.

=== Salina v. Blaksley ===
In 1905, the Kansas Supreme Court, in Salina v. Blaksley, became the first court to interpret the right to keep and bear arms as being only a collective right. The Kansas high court declared: "That the provision in question applies only to the right to bear arms as a member of the state militia, or some other military organization provided for by law, is also apparent from the second amendment to the federal Constitution, which says: 'A well regulated militia, being necessary to the security of a free state, the right of the people to keep and bear arms shall not be infringed.'"

In 2010, Salina v. Blaksley was overruled by the passage of an amendment to the Kansas State Constitution. The amendment provides:

A person has the right to keep and bear arms for the defense of self, family, home and state, for lawful hunting and recreational use, and for any other lawful purpose.

=== People v. Diggins ===
In 2009, the Illinois Supreme Court in People v. Diggins held that the defendant, who had been issued a Firearm Owners Identification Card (FOID) could not be charged with violating the Illinois Unlawful Use of a Weapon statute requirement for firearms to be “unloaded and enclosed in a case, firearm carrying box, shipping box, or other container" for having stored two unloaded handguns in the Center Console of his vehicle.

=== People v. Holmes ===
In 2011, the Illinois Supreme Court in People v. Holmes found that an Indiana resident who had been issued a License to Carry a Handgun could not be charged with violating the Illinois Unlawful Use of a Weapon statute, as he could not, as an Indiana resident, obtain a Firearm Owners Identification Card, or (FOID). They also, citing Diggins, remanded his conviction for having his loaded handgun stored in the rear center console of his vehicle.

=== People v. Aguilar ===
In 2013, the Illinois Supreme Court in People v. Aguilar held that a total ban on carrying firearms outside the home violated the Second Amendment and was unconstitutional. Applying Heller, McDonald, and Moore v. Madigan (a Seventh Circuit decision), the Illinois Supreme Court overturned the conviction of Aguilar, stating that the right to self-defense was at the core of the Second Amendment.

== See also ==
- Concealed carry in the United States
- Gun law in the United States
- Index of gun politics articles
- Miller v. Bonta
- People v. Bray
- People v. Ireland
- Peruta v. San Diego
- United States v. Rahimi
