= Waite Court =

Period of the US Supreme Court from 1874 to 1888

Supreme Court of the United States
Waite Court
- Chase Court ← → Fuller Court
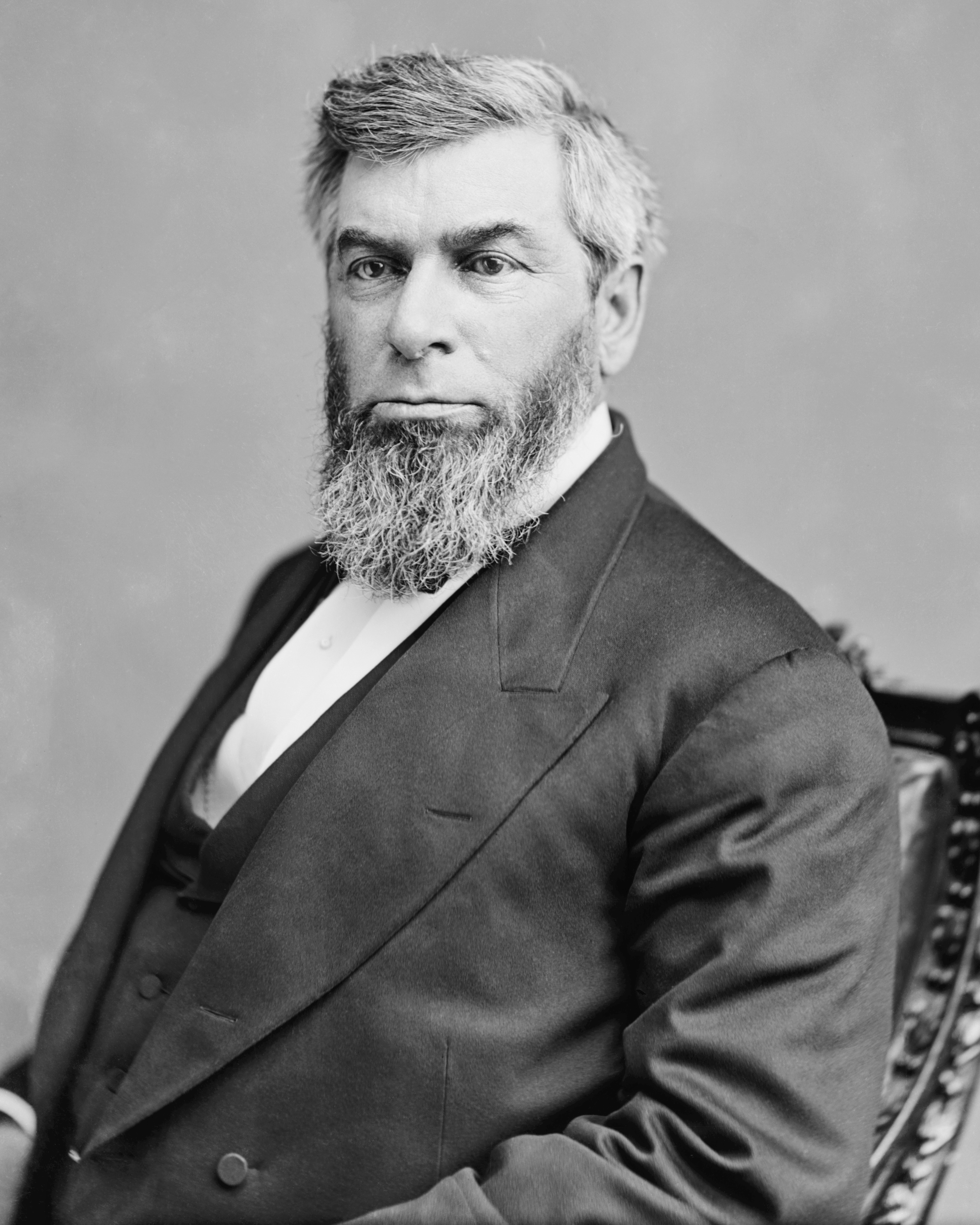
- Chief Justice Morrison Waite
- March 4, 1874 – March 23, 1888 (14 years, 19 days)
- Seat: Old Senate Chamber; Washington, D.C.
- No. of positions: 9
- Waite Court decisions

The Waite Court was the Supreme Court of the United States from 1874 to 1888, when Morrison Waite served as the seventh Chief Justice of the United States. Waite succeeded Salmon P. Chase as Chief Justice after the latter's death. Waite served as Chief Justice until his death, at which point Melville Fuller was nominated and confirmed as Waite's successor.

The Waite Court presided over the end of the Reconstruction Era, and the start of the Gilded Age. It also played an important role during the constitutional crisis that arose following the 1876 presidential election, as five of its members served on the Electoral Commission that Congress created to settle the dispute over who won the Electoral College vote.

During Waite's tenure, the jurisdiction of federal circuit courts (as against that of the State courts) was expanded by the Jurisdiction and Removal Act of 1875, which gave the federal judiciary full jurisdiction over federal questions. As a result of the change, caseloads in the federal courts grew considerably.

== Membership ==
The Waite court began with the appointment of Morrison Waite by President Ulysses S. Grant to succeed Chief Justice Salmon Chase. Grant had previously nominated Attorney General George Henry Williams and former Attorney General Caleb Cushing, but withdrew both nominations after encountering opposition in the Senate. The Waite Court began with eight holdovers from the Chase Court: Nathan Clifford, Noah Haynes Swayne, Samuel Freeman Miller, David Davis, Stephen Johnson Field, William Strong, Joseph P. Bradley, and Ward Hunt. Clifford, Miller, Field, Strong, and Bradley served on the 1877 Electoral Commission.

Davis resigned from the court in 1877 to serve in the United States Senate, and President Rutherford B. Hayes successfully nominated John Marshall Harlan to replace him. In 1880, Hayes successfully nominated William Burnham Woods to replace the retiring Strong. In 1881, President James Garfield nominated Stanley Matthews to replace the retiring Swayne. President Chester A. Arthur added Horace Gray and Samuel Blatchford to the court, replacing Clifford and Hunt. Woods died in 1887, and President Grover Cleveland appointed Lucius Quintus Cincinnatus Lamar II to the court.

=== Timeline ===
Bar key:
Buchanan appointee Lincoln appointee Grant appointee Hayes appointee Garfield appointee Arthur appointee Cleveland appointee

== Other branches ==
Presidents during this court included Ulysses S. Grant, Rutherford B. Hayes, James A. Garfield, Chester A. Arthur, and Grover Cleveland. Congresses during this court included 43rd through the 50th United States Congresses.

== Rulings of the Court ==
Notable rulings of the Waite Court include:

- United States v. Reese (1875): In a 7–2 decision delivered by Chief Justice Waite, the court held that the Fifteenth Amendment does not prevent states from using ostensibly race-neutral limitations on voting rights such as poll taxes, grandfather clauses, and literacy tests. The decision played a major role in allowing states to effectively disenfranchise African Americans.
- Minor v. Happersett (1875): In a unanimous decision written by Chief Justice Waite, the court held that the Constitution did not grant women the right to vote. The ruling was effectively overturned by the ratification of the Nineteenth Amendment in 1920.
- United States v. Cruikshank (1875): In a 5–4 decision delivered by Chief Justice Waite, the court overturned indictments arising from the Colfax massacre. The court held that the Due Process Clause and the Equal Protection Clause only apply to state action, and that the Fourteenth Amendment had not incorporated the First or Second amendments to apply to the states. The decision was a major blow to the power of the Enforcement Acts and the federal government's ability to protect the rights of African-Americans in the South. Later decisions, including Gitlow v. New York (1925), would incorporate most of the Bill of Rights to apply to states.
- Reynolds v. United States (1878): In a decision delivered by Chief Justice Waite, the court upheld the conviction of George Reynolds. Reynolds, a member of the LDS Church, had been convicted of bigamy under the Morrill Anti-Bigamy Act. The court held that the banning of bigamy did not conflict with the Establishment Clause.
- Pennoyer v. Neff (1878): In a decision written by Justice Field, the court held that a state can exert personal jurisdiction over a defendant if the defendant is served notice while physically present in a state.
- Strauder v. West Virginia (1880): In a 7–2 decision delivered by Justice Strong, the court held that the Equal Protection Clause bans exclusionary policies that lead to all-white juries. The decision overturned the conviction of Taylor Strauder, an African-American convicted of murder in West Virginia by an all-white jury. Strauder was the first time that the Court reversed a state criminal conviction for a violation of a constitutional provision concerning criminal procedure.
- Pace v. Alabama (1883): In a unanimous decision delivered by Justice Field, the court upheld Alabama's anti-miscegenation laws. Pace was later overruled by Loving v. Virginia (1967) on the basis of the Equal Protection Clause.
- The Civil Rights Cases (1883): In an 8–1 decision delivered by Justice Bradley, the court struck down part of the Civil Rights Act of 1875, holding that the Equal Protection Clause and the Thirteenth Amendment do not protect against racial discrimination by private actors. The decision has not been overturned, and most future legislation against private discrimination (such as the Civil Rights Act of 1964) was passed on the basis of the Commerce Clause.
- Elk v. Wilkins (1884): In a 7–2 decision delivered by Justice Gray, the court held that the Citizenship Clause does not automatically grant citizenship to Native Americans born on Indian reservations. The case was effectively overruled by the passage of the Indian Citizenship Act in 1924.
- The Railroad Commission Cases (1886): In a 6-2 decision delivered by Chief Justice Waite, the court upheld state fixation of railroad prices as a permissible exercise of police power. Chicago, Milwaukee & St. Paul Railway Co. v. Minnesota (1890) later limited the effect of this ruling.
- Wabash, St. Louis & Pacific Railway Co. v. Illinois (1886):
- Santa Clara County v. Southern Pacific Railroad Co. (1886):
- Presser v. Illinois (1886): In a decision delivered by Justice Woods, the court affirmed its decision in Cruikshank, saying that the First and Second Amendments do not apply to state governments. The decision overturned the conviction of Herman Presser, a member of Lehr und Wehr Verein, a Chicago-based socialist military organization.
- The Telephone Cases (1888): In a series of court cases related to the invention of the telephone, the court upheld Alexander Graham Bell's patents against the claims of Western Union. The court split, 4–3, on the ruling, and Chief Justice Waite delivered the majority opinion.

== Judicial philosophy ==
The Waite Court confronted constitutional questions arising from the Civil War, Reconstruction, the expansion of the federal government following the Civil War, and the emergence of a national economy linked together by railroads. The Waite Court issued several major decisions, including Cruikshank, that denied the federal government the power to protect the civil rights of African Americans. However, historian Michael Les Benedict notes that the civil rights decision were made during the era of dual federalism, and the Waite Court was sincerely concerned with maintaining the balance of power between the federal government and state governments. While the Waite Court struck down civil rights laws, it upheld many economic regulations, in contrast with the Fuller Court.

== Gallery ==
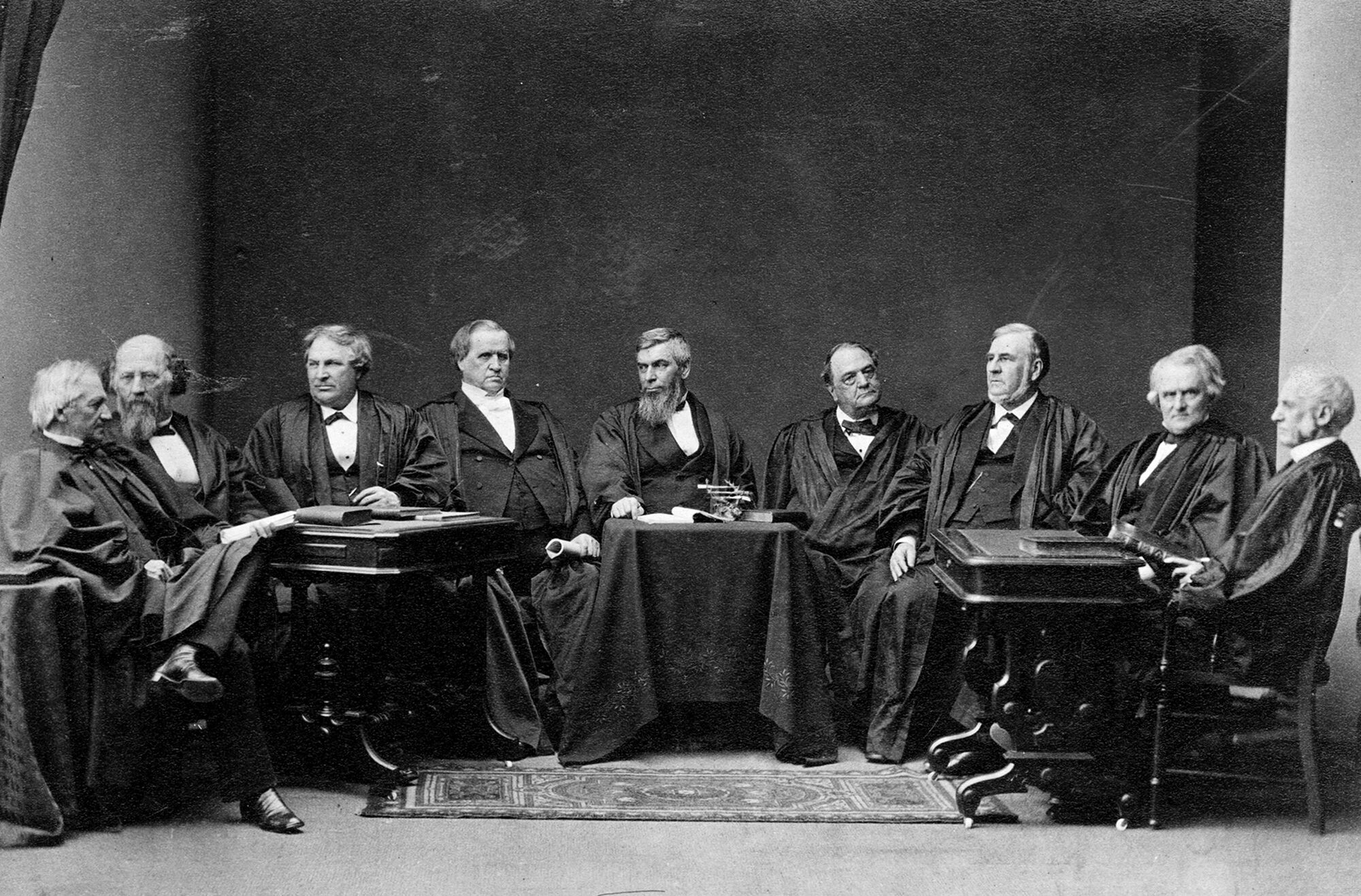
Waite Court
(March 4, 1874 – March 4, 1877)

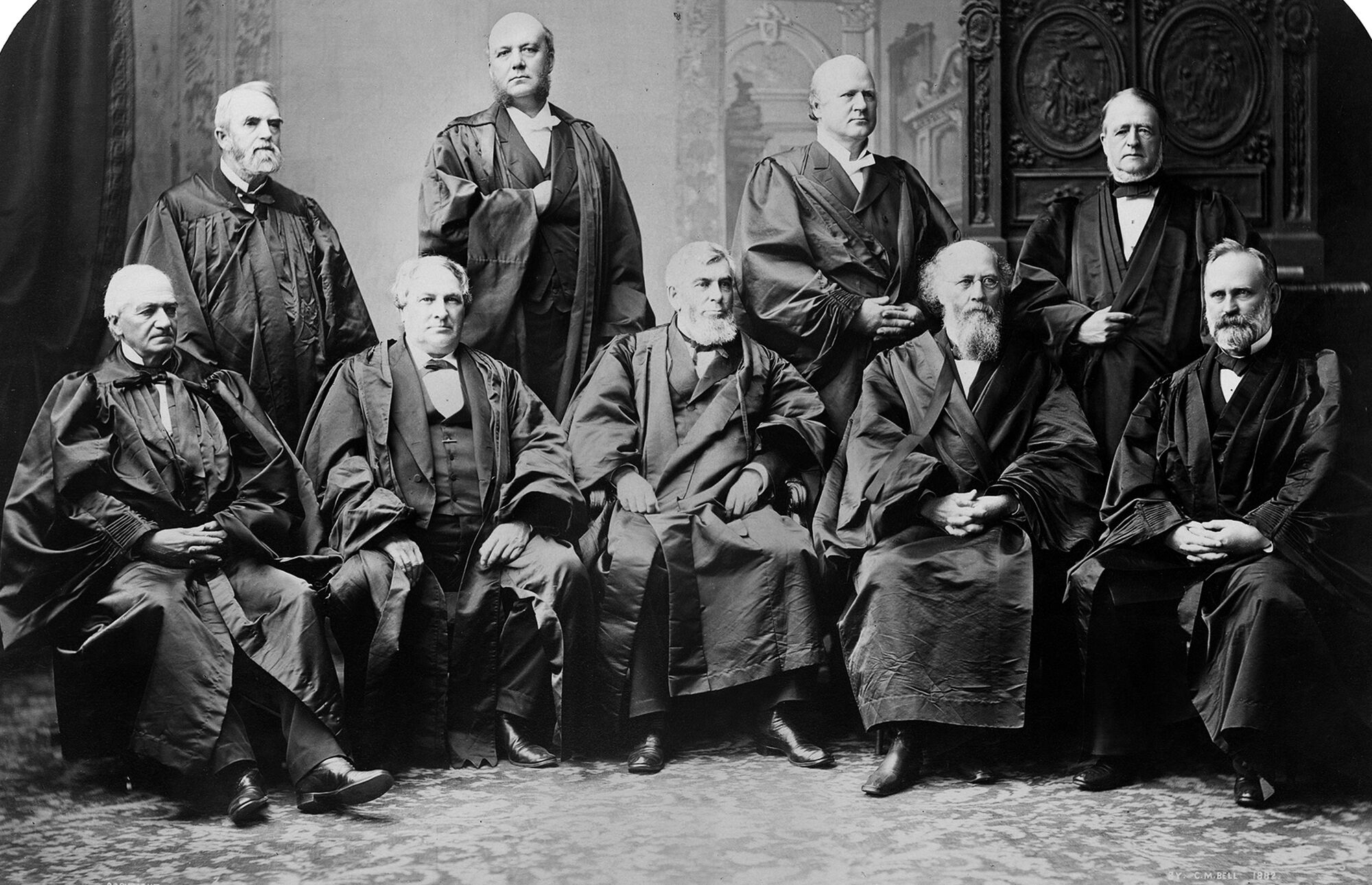
Waite Court
(April 3, 1882 – May 14, 1887) (1882)

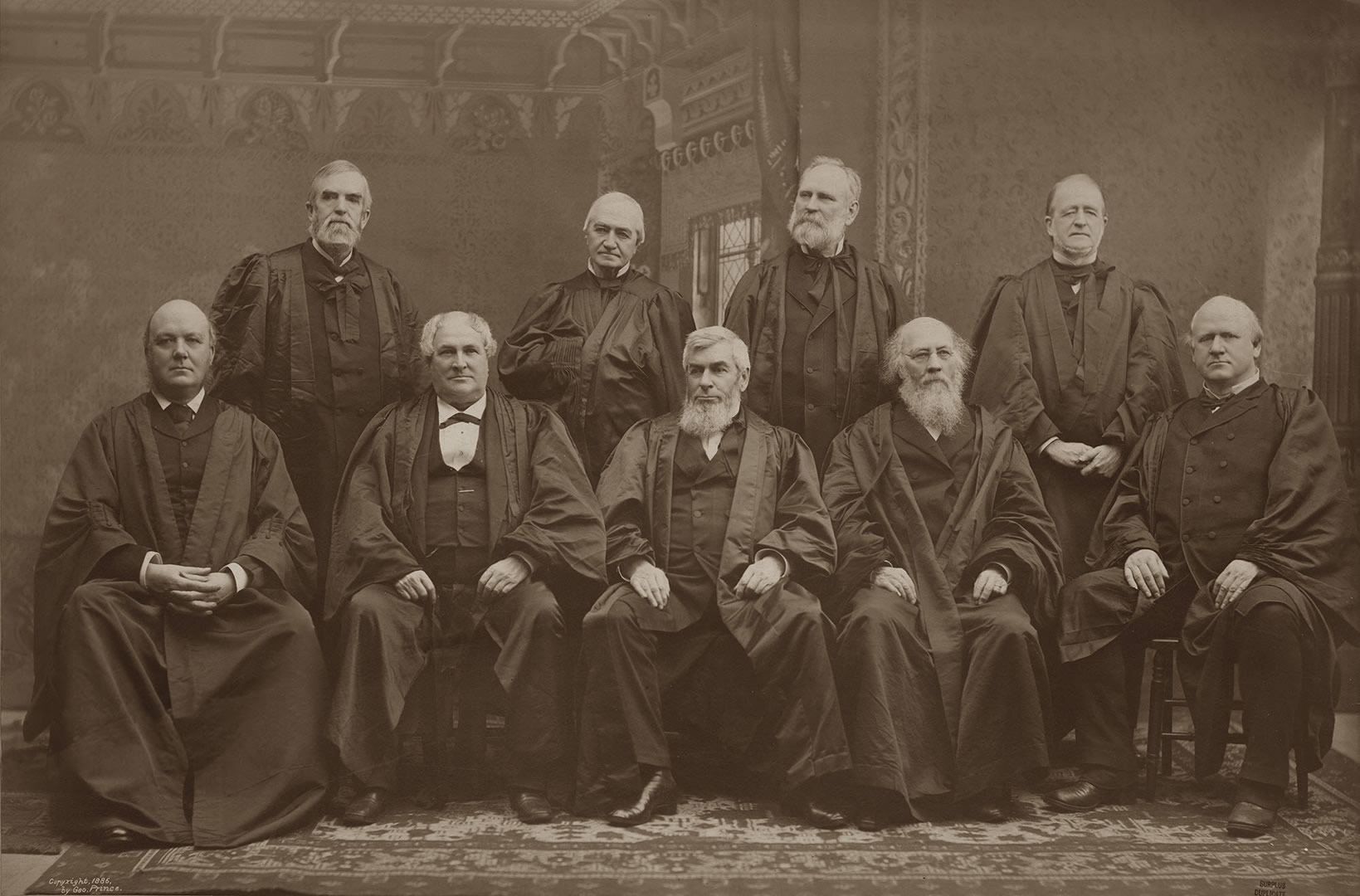
Waite Court
(April 3, 1882 – May 14, 1887) (1886)

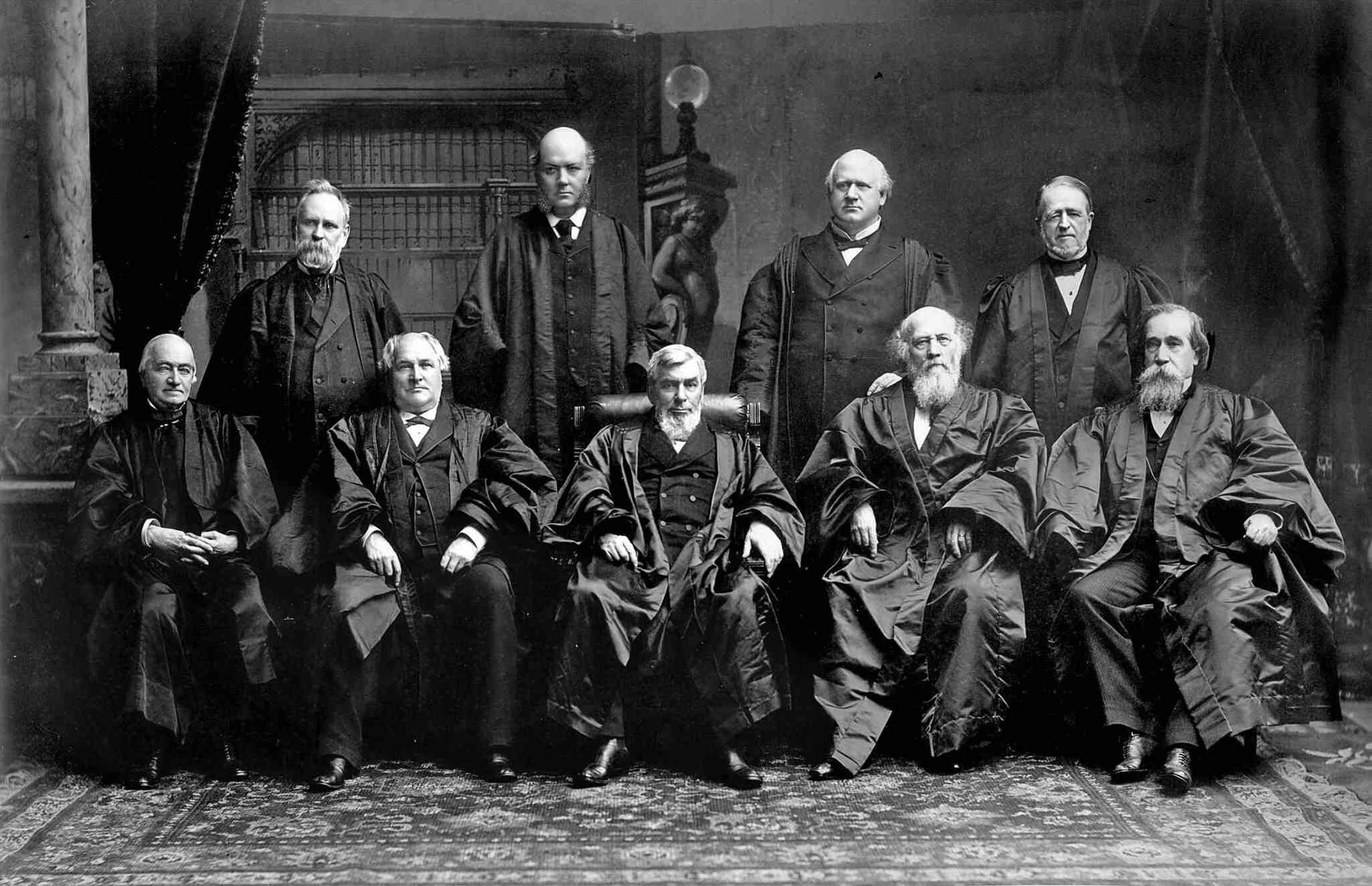
Waite Court
(January 18, 1888 – March 23, 1888)
