= United States v. Rybar =

- Court: United States Court of Appeals for the Third Circuit
- Full case name: United States of America v. Raymond Rybar, Jr.
- Argued: September 13, 1995
- Decided: December 30, 1996
- Citation: 103 F.3d 273

Court membership
- Judges sitting: Dolores Korman Sloviter, Samuel Alito, Marjorie O. Rendell (E.D. Pa.)

Case opinions
- Majority: Sloviter, joined by Rendell
- Dissent: Alito

Laws applied
- U.S. Const. art. I, sec. 8, cl. 3; amend. II

United States v. Rybar, 103 F.3d 273 (3d Cir. 1996), is a case which was argued before the Third Circuit Court of Appeals on September 13, 1995, and decided on December 30, 1996. The appeal addressed the constitutionality of a provision of the Firearm Owners Protection Act of 1986 under the Commerce Clause and the Second Amendment to the United States Constitution.

== The case ==
Raymond Rybar, Jr., a federally licensed firearms dealer, had conditionally pleaded guilty to two counts of possessing an illegal machine gun under the Firearm Owners Protection Act of 1986. He had possessed them at a gun show in Monroeville, Pennsylvania. The weapons in question were a Chinese Type 54 7.62-millimeter machine gun (see note below), and a U.S. Military M-3 .45 caliber submachine gun. Rybar was charged with four felonies, but only convicted of two. The other two counts were for failing to purchase a tax stamp (this is not registration) for the machine guns under the National Firearms Act of 1934 for firearms that can not be classified under 18 U.S.C. § 922o. A federal district court had previously ruled in United States v. Rock Island Armory, Inc. that a conviction under 18 U.S.C. § 922o would violate the fundamental fairness found in the Fifth Amendment. Rybar argued that these convictions violated his Second Amendment rights as well as the Commerce Clause of the United States Constitution.

== The decision ==
The Third Circuit Court upheld his convictions 2-1. Authoring a notable dissenting opinion was then-Judge Samuel Alito. Alito argued that the law under which Rybar had been convicted should be vacated, because Congress, in its lawmaking, had not made sufficient findings regarding the impact on interstate commerce clause to fully justify the court deferring to Congressional judgement that the law was authorized by the Commerce Clause. Rather than actually ruling that the law was unconstitutional, Alito asserted simply that Congress had not sufficiently justified it, allowing that, had Congress made sufficient findings, he would defer to those findings.

== See also ==
- Firearm case law in the United States
