= Nunn v. Georgia =

Georgia Supreme Court ruling

Nunn v. State, 1 Ga. (1 Kel.) 243 (1846) is a Georgia Supreme Court ruling that a state law ban on handguns was an unconstitutional violation of the Second Amendment to the United States Constitution. This was the first gun control measure to be overturned on Second Amendment grounds.

Nor is the right involved in this discussion less comprehensive or valuable: "The right of the people to bear arms shall not be infringed." The right of the whole people, old and young, men, women and boys, and not militia only, to keep and bear arms of every description, not such merely as are used by the militia, shall not be infringed, curtailed, or broken in upon, in the smallest degree; and all this for the important end to be attained: the rearing up and qualifying a well-regulated militia, so vitally necessary to the security of a free State. Our opinion is, that any law, State or Federal, is repugnant to the Constitution, and void, which contravenes this right, originally belonging to our forefathers, trampled under foot by Charles I. and his two wicked sons and successors, reestablished by the revolution of 1688, conveyed to this land of liberty by the colonists, and finally incorporated conspicuously in our own Magna Charta!

== Background ==
In 1837, Georgia passed a law banning the sale and carry of certain types of weapons included Bowie and other types of knives, and pistols. Hawkins H. Nunn was charged and convicted for carrying a pistol in violation of the law. He appealed the ruling, claiming the state law was a violation of the Second Amendment to the United States Constitution. He did not make a claim under the Georgia constitution because Georgia, unlike many other states, did not have a similar protection of the right to bear arms within its constitution.

== Ruling ==
The Nunn court ruled that while the legislature could prohibit the concealed carry of weapons, it could not prohibit the open carry of weapons. To do so would be a violation of the Second Amendment right to carry weapons for self-defense. As there was no proof that Nunn had been carrying his pistol concealed, the conviction was overturned.

We are of the opinion, then, that so far as the act of 1837 seeks to suppress the practice of carrying certain weapons secretly, that it is valid, inasmuch as it does not deprive the citizen of his natural right of self-defence, or of his constitutional right to keep and bear arms. But that so much of it, as contains a prohibition against bearing arms openly, is in conflict with the Constitution, and void; and that, as the defendant has been indicted and convicted for carrying a pistol, without charging that it was done in a concealed manner, under that portion of the statute which entirely forbids its use, the judgment of the court below must be reversed, and the proceeding quashed.

== Legal analysis ==
The court relied on guidance in part from other state decisions and general theories of rights to explain its decision.

=== Other state courts ===
The Nunn court referenced Bliss v. Commonwealth, 12 Ky. (2 Litt.) 90, 13 Am. Dec. 251 (1822) and State v. Reid, 1 Ala. 612, 35 Am. Dec. 44 (1840). In Bliss, the defendant was charged with carrying a weapon concealed, in violation of a Kentucky statute. The Bliss court invalidated the law as a diminution of the Kentucky constitution which provided, "that the right of the citizens to bear arms in defense of themselves and the State, shall not be questioned." The court reasoned that the right as defined has no limits and "in fact consists of nothing else but the liberty." Any restriction on the right, including the prohibition of concealed carry was a violation of the right.

In contrast the court in Reid upheld a similar ban on concealed carry. The Alabama constitution read, "that every citizen has a right to bear arms in defence of himself and the State." The Reid court held that the law "to suppress the evil practice of carrying weapons secretly," did not violate the Alabama constitution. While the legislature could not prevent the carrying of arms, it did retain the right "to enact laws in regard to the manner in which arms shall be borne." Because the restriction on concealed carry was not a prohibition on the right, it was within the ambit of the legislature to restrict concealed carry.

=== Fundamental rights ===
The Nunn court recognized that Reid and Bliss were applying clauses in state constitutions. But, their decisions were relevant to Georgia because the state constitutional protection of the right to keep and bear arms was not a newly given right, but was a recitation of an already existent right.

It is true, that these adjudications are all made on clauses in the State Constitutions; but these instruments confer no new rights on the people which did not belong to them before. When, I would ask, did any legislative body in the Union have the right to deny to its citizens the privilege of keeping and bearing arms in defence of themselves and their country?

The court held that the Second Amendment to the United States Constitution protected the rights of Georgia citizens because free people have the right to self-defense. The fact that Georgia did not have a constitutional amendment did not empower the Georgia legislature to infringe on the right. The right is fundamental, and no free society could exist where the right was prohibited.

But admitting all this, does it follow that because the people refused to delegate to the general government the power to take from them the right to keep and bear arms, that they designed to rest it in the State governments? Is this a right reserved to the States or to themselves? Is it not an unalienable right, which lies at the bottom of every free government? We do not believe that, because the people withheld this arbitrary power of disfranchisement from Congress, they ever intended to confer it on the local legislatures. This right is too dear to be confided to a republican legislature.

The court also held that the whole people, not just militia were afforded the right to keep and bear arms. And the type of arms was not restricted only to those borne by the militia but arms of every type and description.

The right of the whole people, old and young, men, women and boys, and not militia only, to keep and bear arms of every description, and not such merely as are used by the militia, shall not be infringed, curtailed, or broken in upon, in the smallest degree; and all this for the important end to be attained: the rearing up and qualifying a well-regulated militia, so vitally necessary to the security of the free State.

The court's concept of rights meant that other portions of the Bill of Rights would also apply to the States. For example, the court explained that the right to peaceably assemble, protected under the First Amendment, was applicable to both the national and state governments. The court also cited to the New York case of People vs. Goodwin, 18 John. Rep. 200 (N.Y.Sup. 1820) which applied Fifth Amendment double jeopardy prohibitions to New York state court operations. The court explained how to determine which constitutional provisions apply to the state and which applied only the federal government; the relevant question is whether the concepts in the constitution were confined only to the national government or if they could be extended to the states as well. Citing Goodwin:

These general and comprehensive expressions extend the provisions of the constitution of the United States to every article which is not confined, by the subject matter, to the national government, and is equally applicable to the states.

== Modern significance ==
The Nunn court's decision has continuing relevance to the ongoing debate over gun rights. The Supreme Court in its ruling in Heller v. District of Columbia said Nunn, "...perfectly captured the way in which the operative clause of the Second amendment furthered the purpose announced in the prefatory clause. ... " The Nunn court concept of fundamental rights was relevant to determine whether or not the Second Amendment is a restriction only on the federal government or whether the right to keep and bear arms is a fundamental right that cannot be infringed by the state governments.

== See also ==
- Firearm case law in the United States
