= Lehr und Wehr Verein =

1870s socialist militia in Chicago

Education and Defense Society Lehr und Wehr Verein
- Abbreviation: LWV
- Leader: Herman Presser
- Founded: April 19, 1875; 151 years ago
- Dissolved: 1887; 139 years ago
- Headquarters: New York City
- Ideology: Socialism
- Political position: Left-wing

The Lehr und Wehr Verein ("Education and Defense Society") was a socialist military organization founded in 1875, in Chicago, Illinois. The group had been formed to counter the armed private armies of companies in Chicago, protecting them from Anarchist attacks. It soon became part of a new wave of such attacks.

== History ==
The Lehr und Wehr Verein (LWV) was registered with the Illinois state authorities on April 19, 1875, with about 30 Bohemian and German members. The LWV trained and drilled in anticipation of an envisaged confrontation between Capital and Labor.

In 1879 the State Legislature passed an act establishing a state militia and obliging all other militias to obtain a license from the Governor. That December, the LWV paraded 400 strong, armed with rifles. They were headed by Herman Presser, a socialist worker riding a horse and armed with a saber. Presser was arrested, as the organization had no license.

Lawyers for the LWV argued that the new law breached the Second Amendment to the United States Constitution. Presser v. Illinois became a test case which proceeded through the criminal courts, to the Illinois Supreme Court, and to the Supreme Court of the United States. In each court Presser's conviction was upheld. The LWV never again paraded in public.

== See also ==
- Philip Van Patten
- Presser v. Illinois
