= McDonald v. City of Chicago =

- Supreme Court of the United States

Argued March 2, 2010 Decided June 28, 2010
- Full case name: Otis McDonald, et al. v. City of Chicago, Illinois, et al.
- Docket no.: 08-1521
- Citations: 561 U.S. 742 (more) 130 S. Ct. 3020; 177 L. Ed. 2d 894
- Argument: Oral argument
- Opinion announcement: Opinion announcement
- Decision: Opinion

Case history
- Prior: Judgment for defendants, 617 F. Supp. 2d 752 (N.D. Ill. 2008), aff'd, 567 F.3d 856 (7th Cir. 2009), cert. granted, 557 U.S. 965 (2009).

Holding
- The right to keep and bear arms for self defense in one's home is protected under the Second Amendment, and is incorporated against the states through the Due Process Clause of the Fourteenth Amendment.

Court membership
- Chief Justice John Roberts Associate Justices John P. Stevens · Antonin Scalia; Anthony Kennedy · Clarence Thomas; Ruth Bader Ginsburg · Stephen Breyer; Samuel Alito · Sonia Sotomayor

Case opinions
- Majority: Alito (Parts I, II–A, II–B, II–D, III–A, and III–B), joined by Roberts, Scalia, Kennedy, Thomas
- Plurality: Alito (Parts II–C, IV, and V), joined by Roberts, Scalia, Kennedy
- Concurrence: Scalia
- Concurrence: Thomas (in part and in judgment)
- Dissent: Stevens
- Dissent: Breyer, joined by Ginsburg, Sotomayor

Laws applied
- U.S. Const. amends. II, XIV
- This case overturned a previous ruling or rulings
- United States v. Cruikshank (1876) (in part); Presser v. Illinois (1886); Miller v. Texas (1894)

McDonald v. City of Chicago, 561 U.S. 742 (2010), is a landmark decision of the Supreme Court of the United States that found that the right of an individual to "keep and bear arms", as protected under the Second Amendment, is incorporated by the Fourteenth Amendment and is thereby enforceable against the states. The decision cleared up the uncertainty left in the wake of District of Columbia v. Heller (2008) as to the scope of gun rights in regard to the states.

Initially, the Court of Appeals for the Seventh Circuit had upheld a Chicago ordinance banning the possession of handguns as well as other gun regulations affecting rifles and shotguns, citing United States v. Cruikshank (1876), Presser v. Illinois (1886), and Miller v. Texas (1894). The petition for certiorari was filed by Alan Gura, the attorney who had successfully argued Heller, and Chicago-area attorney David G. Sigale. The Second Amendment Foundation and the Illinois State Rifle Association sponsored the litigation on behalf of several Chicago residents, including retiree Otis McDonald.

The oral arguments took place on March 2, 2010. On June 28, 2010, the Supreme Court, in a 5–4 decision, reversed the Seventh Circuit's decision, holding that the Second Amendment was incorporated under the Fourteenth Amendment, thus protecting those rights from infringement by state and local governments. It then remanded the case back to the Seventh Circuit to resolve conflicts between certain Chicago gun restrictions and the Second Amendment.

== Background ==
In McDonald v. City of Chicago, Chicago resident Otis McDonald, a 76-year-old retired maintenance engineer, had lived in the Morgan Park neighborhood since buying a house there in 1971. McDonald described the decline of his neighborhood as being taken over by gangs and drug dealers. His lawn was regularly littered with refuse, and his home and garage had been broken into a combined five times, the most recent robbery being committed by a man whom McDonald recognized from his own neighborhood. As an experienced hunter, McDonald legally owned shotguns but believed them to be too unwieldy in the event of a robbery and so he wanted to purchase a handgun for personal home defense. Chicago required that all firearms in the city be registered but had refused all new handgun registrations since 1982, when a citywide handgun ban was passed. As a result, he was unable to own a handgun legally. He joined three other Chicago residents in 2008 in filing a lawsuit that became McDonald v. City of Chicago.

== McDonald v. Chicago as compared to NRA v. Chicago ==
Despite being consolidated at the U.S. Court of Appeals for the Seventh Circuit, the cases are different in scope in terms of the specific regulations challenged and the legal argument for applying the Second Amendment against state and local governments. The Second Amendment Foundation brought the McDonald case to the Supreme Court with its lead attorney Alan Gura. The cases were appealed separately to the U.S. Supreme Court.

- McDonald Petition for Certiorari
- Chicago Brief in Opposition to Cert Petition

=== Regulations challenged ===
McDonald challenged four broad aspects of Chicago's gun registration law, which, according to the plaintiffs:

- Prohibit the registration of handguns, thus effecting a broad handgun ban
- Require that guns be registered prior to their acquisition by Chicago residents
- Mandate that guns be re-registered annually, with another payment of the fee
- Render any gun permanently non-registrable if its registration lapses

=== Legal basis for incorporation ===
All of the post-Heller cases, including McDonald, NRA v. Chicago, Nordyke and Maloney, argued that the Second Amendment, in addition to applying to federal jurisdictions, should also be applied against state and local governments, using a judicial process called selective incorporation. Selective incorporation involves convincing the court that a right is "fundamental" by being "implicit in the concept of ordered liberty" or "deeply rooted in our nation's history and traditions" as defined most recently in the Supreme Court case Duncan v. Louisiana, 391 U.S. 145 (1968).

In addition to claiming the Second Amendment should be incorporated through the selective incorporation process, McDonald is unique among post-Heller gun cases in that it asked the court to overturn the Slaughter-House Cases, 83 U.S. 36 (1873). Slaughter-House determined that the 14th Amendment's Privileges or Immunities Clause did not apply the Bill of Rights to the actions of states (and by extension, local governments). If it had been overturned, the Selective Incorporation process may have become unnecessary, since the entire Bill of Rights, including the 2nd Amendment, would arguably be applied to the states.

In attempting to overturn Slaughter-House, this case garnered the attention and support of both conservative and liberal legal scholars interested in its potential application in areas outside of firearms law. Their interest was that if Slaughter-House had been overturned, it would have been possible that constitutional guarantees such as the right to a jury in civil cases, right to a grand jury in felony cases, and other parts of the Bill of Rights, as well as future court rulings and existing federal precedent, not universally guaranteed in actions by the states, would have been applied against the states automatically.

In his concurring opinion, Justice Thomas criticized the Slaughter-House and Cruikshank decisions, proposing that "the right to keep and bear arms is a privilege of American citizenship that applies to the States through the Fourteenth Amendment's Privileges or Immunities Clause."

== Amici curiae ==
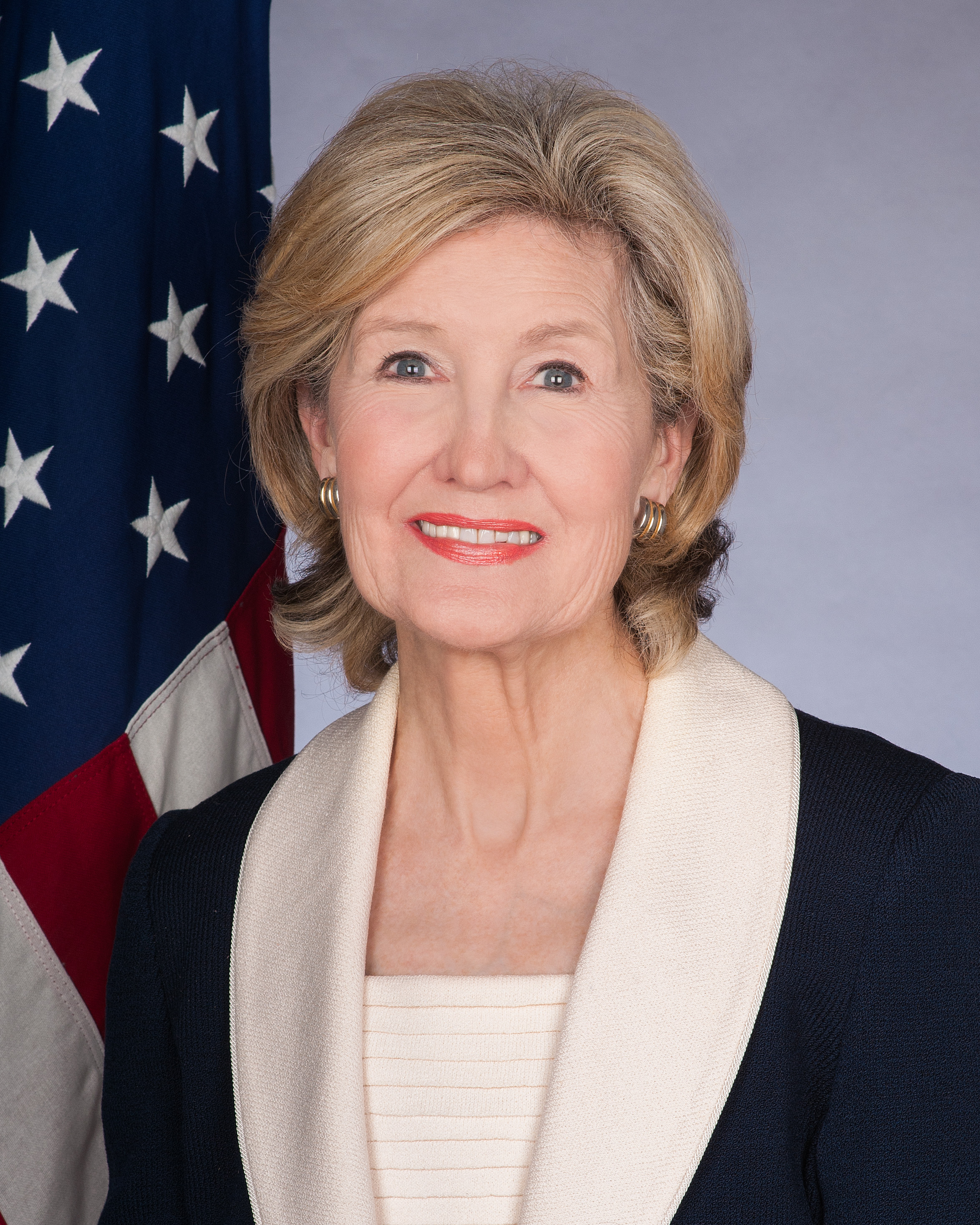
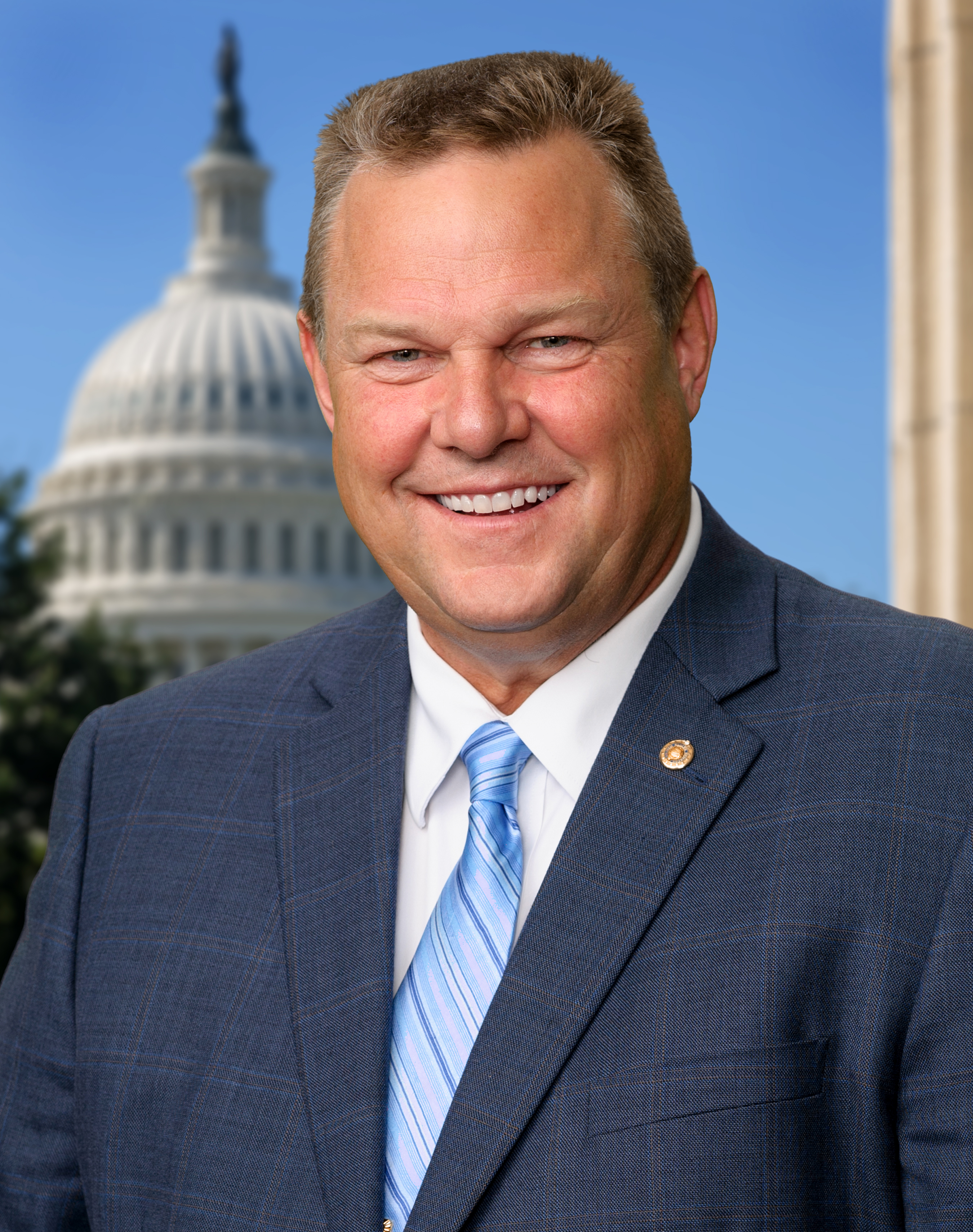
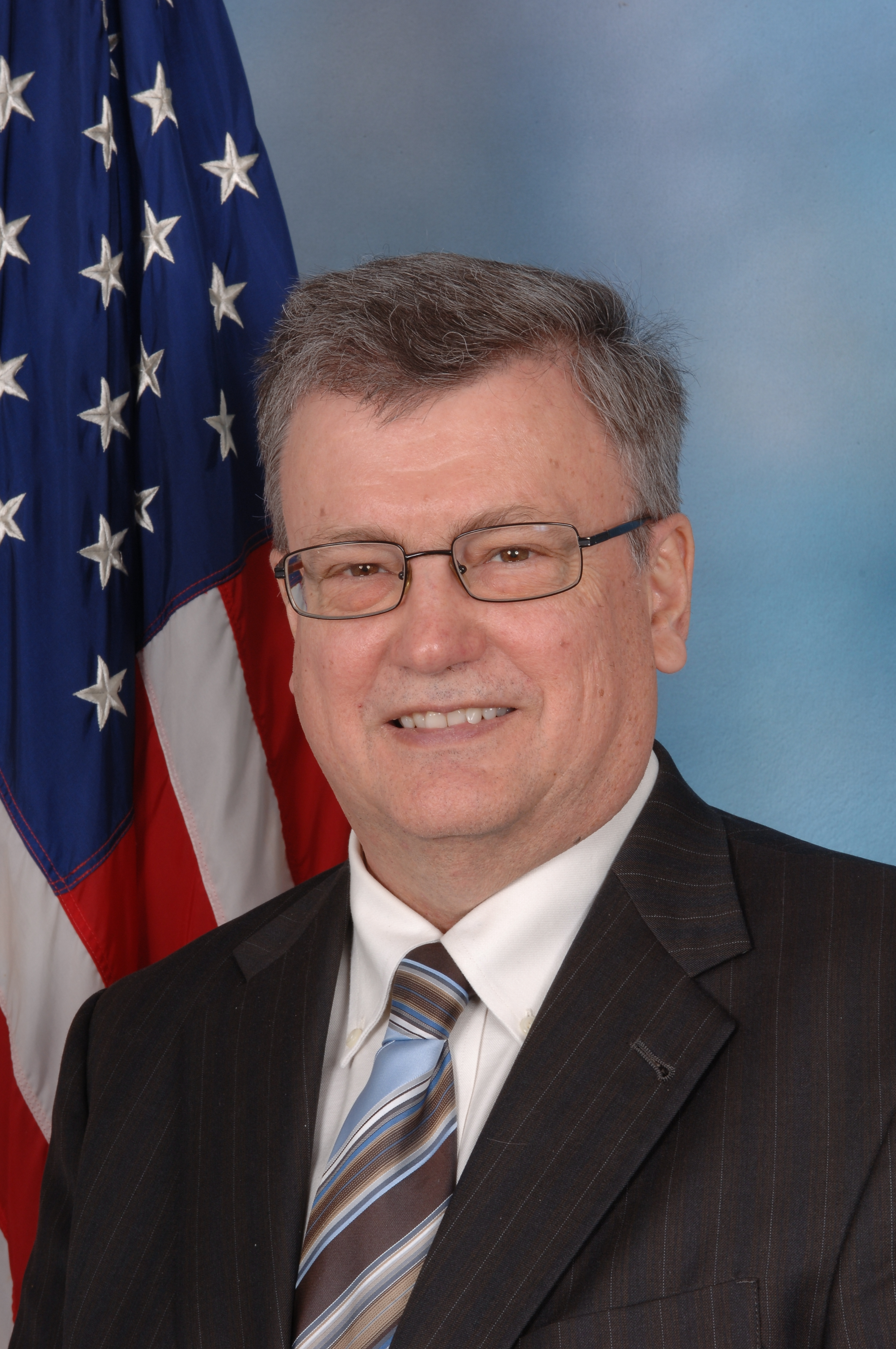
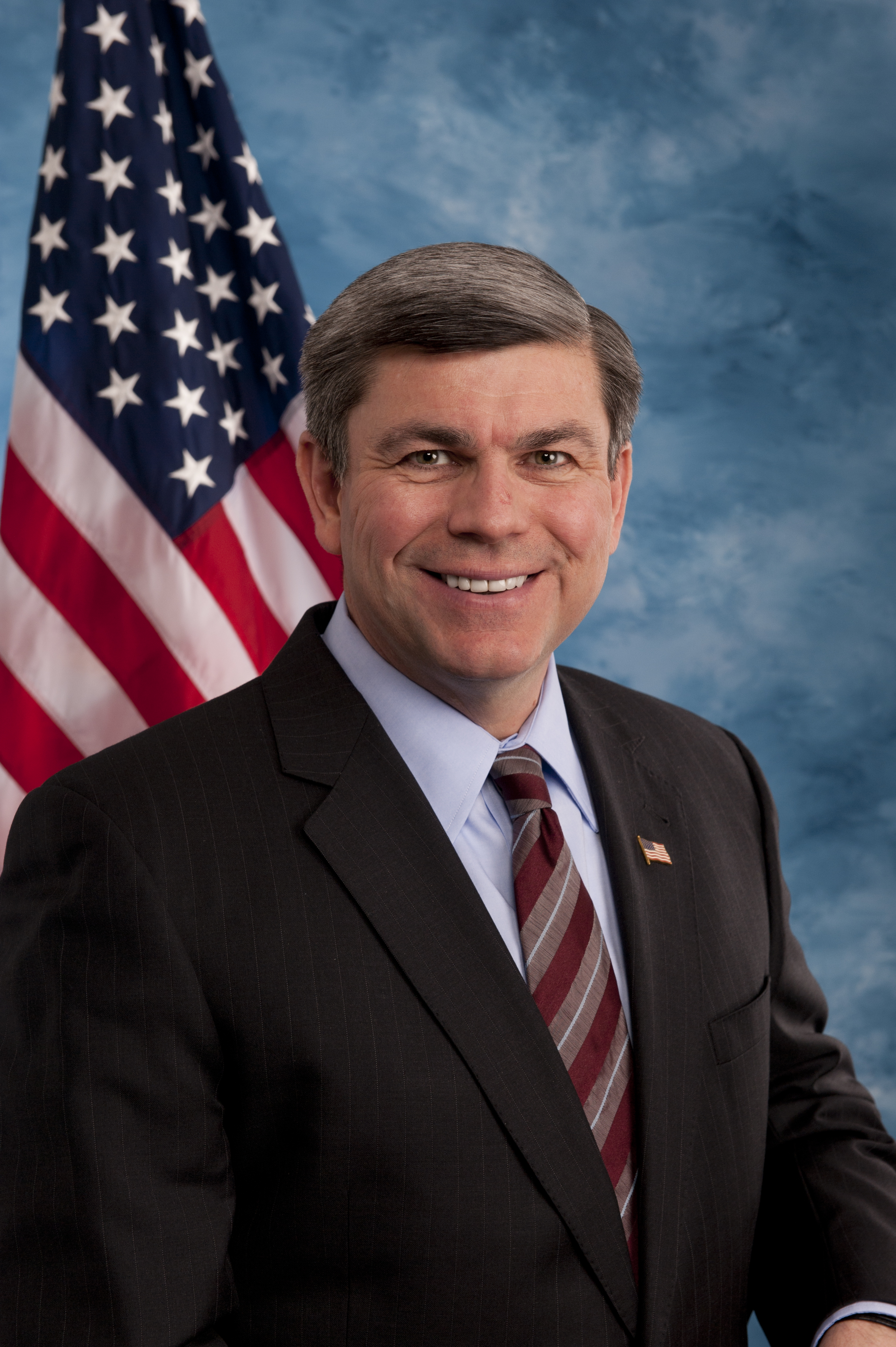
Members of Congress (clockwise from upper left) Kay Bailey Hutchison, Jon Tester, Mike Ross and Mark Souder filed an amicus brief together.

Thirty-three amici curiae ("friends of the court") briefs for this case were filed with the Clerk of the Supreme Court.

One of these briefs was filed by U.S. senators Kay Bailey Hutchison (R, TX) and Jon Tester (D, MT) and U.S. representatives Mark Souder (R, IN) and Mike Ross (D, AR) asking the Supreme Court to find in favor of the petitioners and rule that the Second Amendment does apply to the states. The brief was signed by 58 senators and 251 representatives, more members of Congress than any amicus curiae brief in history. Moreover, thirty-two states under the aegis of Texas (and California independently) also filed amici curiae.

== Decision ==
=== Central Second Amendment findings ===
In People v. Aguilar (2013), the Illinois Supreme Court summed up the central Second Amendment findings in McDonald:

Two years later, in McDonald v. City of Chicago, 561 U.S. ___, ___, 130 S. Ct. 3020, 3050 (2010), the Supreme Court held that the second amendment right recognized in Heller is fully applicable to the states through the due process clause of the fourteenth amendment. In so holding, the Court reiterated that "the Second Amendment protects the right to keep and bear arms for the purpose of self-defense" (id. at ___, 130 S. Ct. at 3026); that "individual self-defense is 'the central component' of the Second Amendment right" (emphasis in original) (id. at ___, 130 S. Ct. at 3036 (quoting Heller, 554 U.S. at 599)); and that "[s]elf-defense is a basic right, recognized by many legal systems from ancient times to the present day" (id. at ___, 130 S. Ct. at 3036).

In United States v. Rahimi (2024) the Supreme Court stated "that the right to keep and bear arms is among the "fundamental rights necessary to our system of ordered liberty." McDonald v. Chicago, 561 U. S. 742, 778 (2010)."

=== Opinion ===
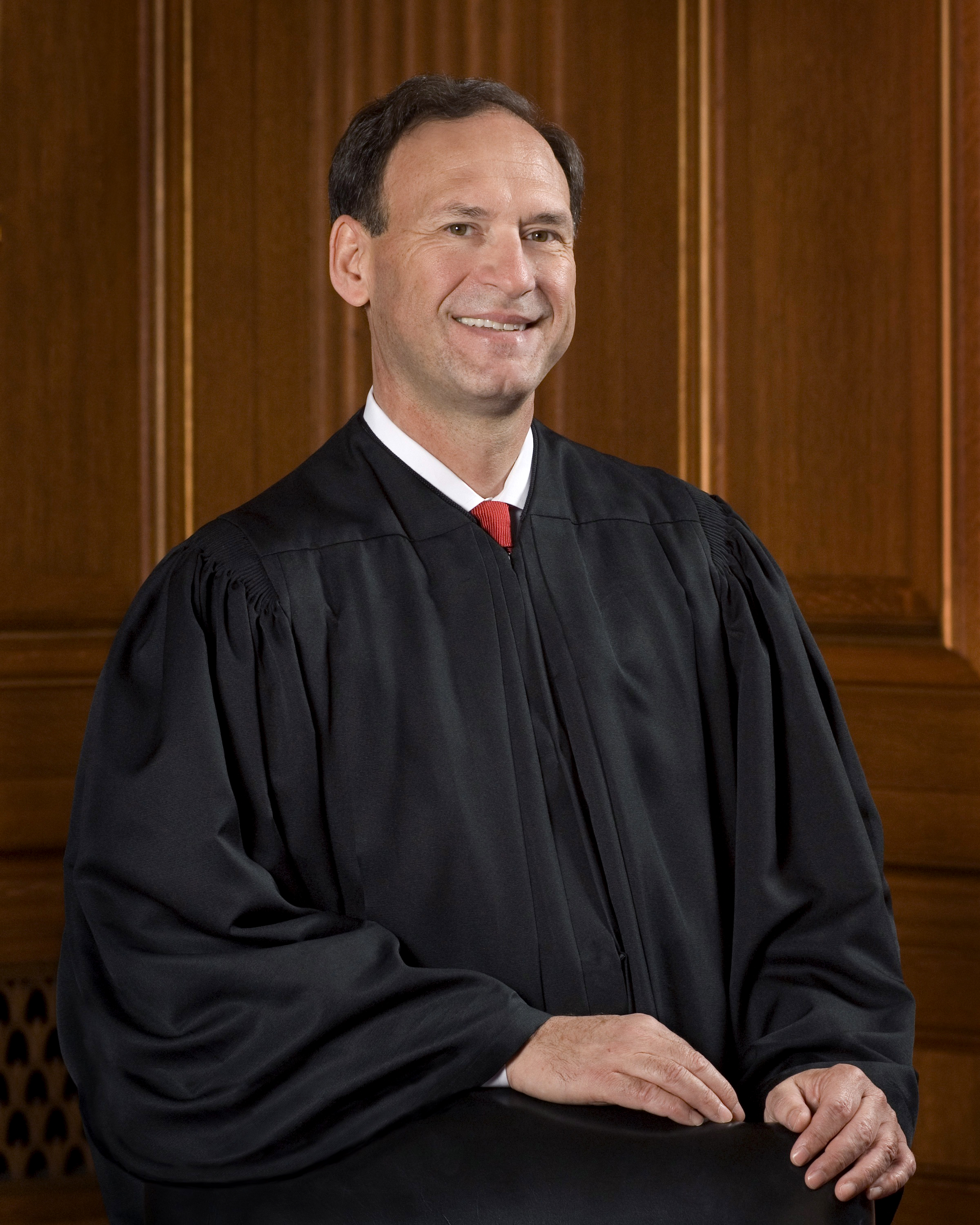
Samuel Alito delivered the opinion of the Court

The majority agreed that the Fourteenth Amendment incorporates the Second Amendment right recognized in Heller, but was split on the rationale. Writing for four members of the court, Justice Alito found that the Due Process Clause incorporates that right against the States. While joining most of the rest of Alito's opinion, Justice Thomas, in his concurrence, concluded that the right to bear arms is incorporated only on alternative grounds, namely through the Privileges or Immunities Clause of the Fourteenth Amendment. Alito also reaffirmed, in part of the opinion for four justices, that certain firearms restrictions mentioned in District of Columbia v. Heller are assumed permissible and not directly dealt with in this case. Such restrictions include those to "prohibit ... the possession of firearms by felons and the mentally ill" and "laws forbidding the carrying of firearms in sensitive places such as schools and government buildings, or laws imposing conditions and qualifications on the commercial sale of arms."

=== Dissents ===
Justice Stevens wrote a lengthy dissenting opinion. Citing Cruikshank, Presser and Miller v. Texas, Stevens wrote that the "so-called incorporation question was squarely and, in my view, correctly resolved in the late 19th century". Stevens called McDonald "a substantive due process case", so the question was whether "liberty" under the Due Process Clause includes keeping a working firearm at home. He wrote that rights protected against the states "need not be identical in shape or scope" to rights protected against the federal government. Stevens agreed that the Court's cases "offer a principled basis for holding that petitioners have a constitutional right to possess a usable firearm in the home", but he was "ultimately persuaded that a better reading of our case law supports the city of Chicago". He would not rule out a handgun claim by "an elderly widow who lives in a dangerous neighborhood and does not have the strength to operate a long gun".

Justice Breyer wrote, "In sum, the Framers did not write the Second Amendment in order to protect a private right of armed self defense. There has been, and is, no consensus that the right is, or was, 'fundamental.'"

== Reception ==
The Court's ruling was received favorably by both the National Rifle Association of America and the Brady Campaign to Prevent Gun Violence. Each issued public statements indicating that they felt vindicated by the Court's holding. However, the court did not include a "clarification of the standard for review" as requested by the Brady group in their amicus brief. In a discussion on the day of the ruling Wayne LaPierre of the NRA and Paul Helmke of the Brady Center both agreed that the Court's ruling ruled out bans on handguns which are to be used for "lawful purposes" such as self-protection in the home. But as to the general question of gun laws not covered in McDonald, a large number of lawsuits are needed to determine whether any other existing State gun regulations might also be unconstitutional. McDonald, supra., stated that the "2nd Amendment is 'fully applicable' to all of the States", but Wayne LaPierre expressed caution that the NRA has "a lot of work ahead" attempting to overturn other gun control regulations not covered by McDonald. Helmke predicted that in that regard the NRA was "going to lose most of those lawsuits".

== Related cases ==
The day after Heller was filed, the National Rifle Association filed five similar lawsuits challenging local gun bans:

- Guy Montag Doe v. San Francisco Housing Authority: In January, 2009, the San Francisco Housing Authority reached a settlement in favor of the plaintiff, Guy Montag Doe, which allows residents to possess legal firearms within a SFHA apartment building.
- Three unnamed suits against the Chicago suburbs of Evanston, Morton Grove and Oak Park.
- NRA v. Chicago: eventually merged with McDonald.

Other notable post-Heller Second Amendment court cases include:

- Nordyke v. King, 563 F.3d 439 (9th. Cir. 2009): Held that the 2nd Amendment did apply to the states in the Ninth Circuit, though the ruling was vacated for en banc reconsideration, and the Alameda County, California prohibition of firearms on county property remained constitutional until overturned by McDonald v. Chicago.
- Maloney v. Rice (a.k.a. Maloney v. Cuomo and Maloney v. Spitzer) , 554 F.3d 56 (2d. Cir. 2009): Held that the 2nd Amendment does not apply to the states in the Second Circuit. The case involved a state ban on nunchaku sticks (a martial arts weapon). In a memorandum opinion dated June 29, 2010, the Supreme Court vacated the Second Circuit decision in Maloney and remanded for further consideration in light of McDonald's holding that the Second Amendment does apply to the states. In December 2018, it was determined in Maloney v. Singas that nunchaku are considered arms under the second amendment, and as such New York State's outright 1974 ban is unconstitutional.
- State of Washington v. Sieyes: The Washington Supreme Court held that the 2nd Amendment is incorporated and applies to Washington State, via the Due Process Clause of the Fourteenth Amendment. Superseded by, but consistent with, McDonald.
- Commonwealth v. Runyan, 456 Mass. 230 (2010): The Supreme Judicial Court of Massachusetts held that Heller did not apply to the Massachusetts state legislature and that the gun locks ordered under Massachusetts law are different from those regulated in Heller. Partially overturned by McDonald; The decisions made in Heller do apply to the State of Massachusetts (as with all States), but the gun lock requisite under MA law may indeed differ enough from D.C.'s statute to be found constitutional.
- Ezell v. Chicago, July 6, 2011: The Seventh Circuit reversed a district court decision that the post-McDonald measures adopted by the City of Chicago were constitutional. The Chicago law required firearms training in a shooting range to obtain a gun permit, but also banned shooting ranges within the City of Chicago. The City had argued that applicants could obtain their training at gun ranges in the suburbs. The opinion noted that Chicago could not infringe Second Amendment rights on the grounds that they could be exercised elsewhere, any more than it could infringe the right to freedom of speech on the grounds that citizens could speak elsewhere.
- In Moore v. Madigan, the United States Court of Appeals for the Seventh Circuit issued a ruling in December 2012 that would have allowed permitless carry (by striking down the ban) requiring the Illinois Legislature to modify existing State law to adopt a concealed carry law to allow the denizens of Illinois the right to bear arms outside of the home if the state wanted to retain control over whom may carry a firearm in public. In February 2013, the entire Court of Appeals decided to let stand the December 2012 decision of a three-judge panel. Following a final 30-day extension, Illinois was required by the court to draft a concealed carry law by July 9, 2013. In the end, the legislature overrode a veto of the governor and approved Illinois concealed carry to begin January 2014, at the latest.
- In New York State Rifle & Pistol Association, Inc. v. Bruen, the United States Supreme Court held that the Second and Fourteenth Amendments protect the right of law-abiding citizens with ordinary self-defense needs to exercise their right to keep and bear arms outside the home.

== See also ==
- 2nd Amendment Day
- Firearm case law in the United States
- List of United States Supreme Court cases, volume 561
