= Nordyke v. King =

US federal court case

- Court: United States Court of Appeals for the Ninth Circuit
- Full case name: Russell Allen Nordyke, et al v. Mary V. King, et al
- Argued: January 15, 2009
- Reargued: October 19, 2010
- Decided: May 2, 2011
- Citations: 563 F.3d 439 (9th Cir. 2009); Rehearing, 644 F.3d 776 (9th Cir. 2011); En banc, 681 F. 3d 1041 (9th Cir. 2012)

Court membership
- Judges sitting: Arthur Alarcón, Diarmuid O'Scannlain, Ronald M. Gould

Case opinions
- Majority: O'Scannlain, joined by Alarcón
- Concurrence: Gould

Laws applied
- Second Amendment

Nordyke v. King was a case in the United States Court of Appeals for the Ninth Circuit in which a ban of firearms on all public property and whether the Second Amendment should be applied to the state and local governments is to be decided. After several hearings at different levels of the federal court system, Alameda County, California promised that gun shows could be held on county property, essentially repudiating its ordinance.

== Background ==
The Board of Supervisors of Alameda County, California had passed Ordinance No. 0-2000-22, codified at General Ordinance Code section 9.12.120, making it a misdemeanor to bring onto or to possess a firearm or ammunition on all County property. Gun show promoters challenged the ordinance.

== Decisions ==
=== Nordyke IV ===
On April 20, 2009, a three-judge panel of the Ninth Circuit affirmed the district court ruling which upheld the Alameda County ordinance. The court accepted Nordyke's argument that the Second Amendment was incorporated through the Due Process Clause of the Fourteenth Amendment and so that it applied to the states and local governments. In coming to that conclusion, the court found the right to keep and bear arms is "deeply rooted in this Nation’s history and tradition", a key factor under Duncan v. Louisiana for incorporation. However, the court ruled that the ordinance was constitutional, finding the ban of guns on county property to fall under Heller's doctrine allowing governments to restrict possession in "sensitive" places.

=== Nordyke V ===
==== En banc rehearing ====
On May 18, 2009, an anonymous judge of the Ninth Circuit called for briefing from both sides on whether the case should be reheard en banc. On July 29, 2009, the Ninth Circuit decided to rehear this case en banc, thereby vacating both parts of the April 20 ruling. After rehearing the case on September 24, 2009, the Ninth Circuit decided to delay ruling on the case until the Supreme Court decided McDonald v. Chicago.

==== Three judge panel rehearing ====
On July 12, 2010, the case was remanded by the en banc panel to the three judge panel for rehearing following McDonald v. Chicago, and oral arguments were heard by a panel of the U.S. Ninth Circuit Court on October 19, 2010. On May 2, 2011, the court released its decision. Nordyke loses and is sent back to district court to argue the second amendment claim.

=== Nordyke VI ===
Subsequently, the court entertained a request from the plaintiffs for a rehearing en banc, and in June 2011 ordered the defendants to file a response. On November 28, 2011, the full Ninth Circuit Court agreed to hear the case.

The case was reheard on March 19, 2012. During oral arguments the county stated that gun shows were not banned, and could be held with unloaded firearms if they were secured with cables. On April 4, 2012, the court ordered the parties to mediation. On June 1, 2012, the full appeals court ruled that the county law was constitutional, since it allowed gun shows to take place on the fairgrounds, with tight restrictions.

== See also ==
- Second Amendment
- Gun law in the United States
- Gun violence in the United States
- National Firearms Act
