= 2nd Amendment Day =

Public awareness day observed in the United States

2nd Amendment Day is a public awareness day observed in Oklahoma, Pennsylvania, and South Carolina in the United States. Its purpose is to promote the view that the Second Amendment to the United States Constitution grants absolute rights to for adult-age Americans to own any type of firearms. The Second Amendment, along with the nine others ratified on December 15, 1791, comprise the Constitution's Bill of Rights.

== Observances ==
Oklahoma observes 2nd Amendment Day on June 28. This is because the U.S. Supreme Court ruled in favor of the 2nd Amendment in the case of McDonald v. City of Chicago on June 28, 2010. Pennsylvania observes 2nd Amendment Day on the fourth Tuesday of May.

South Carolina legislators passed the Second Amendment Education Act, which is a two-fold move to protect gun rights in state schools. First, it would establish Second Amendment Awareness Day each year on Dec. 15. The day would be highlighted by a poster and essay contest in which students of all grades would be encouraged to submit entries on the theme of “The Right to Bear Arms; One American Right Protecting All Others.” From the submissions, the South Carolina Legislative Sportsmen's Caucus would select statewide winners.

== See also ==
- Second Amendment sanctuary
- Right of self-defense
- Gun politics in the United States
- Gun culture in the United States
