= Presser v. Illinois =

- Supreme Court of the United States

Argued November 23–24, 1885 Decided January 4, 1886
- Full case name: Herman Presser v. State of Illinois
- Citations: 116 U.S. 252 (more) 6 S. Ct. 580; 29 L. Ed. 615; 1886 U.S. LEXIS 1760

Holding
- The states may forbid private armies. The Second Amendment only applies to the federal government.

Court membership
- Chief Justice Morrison Waite Associate Justices Samuel F. Miller · Stephen J. Field; Joseph P. Bradley · John M. Harlan; William B. Woods · Stanley Matthews; Horace Gray · Samuel Blatchford

Case opinion
- Majority: Woods, joined by unanimous
- Overruled by
- McDonald v. City of Chicago (2010)

Presser v. Illinois, 116 U.S. 252 (1886), was a landmark decision of the Supreme Court of the United States that held, "Unless restrained by their own constitutions, state legislatures may enact statutes to control and regulate all organizations, drilling, and parading of military bodies and associations except those which are authorized by the militia laws of the United States." It states that the Second Amendment to the United States Constitution limited only the power of Congress and the national government to control firearms, not that of the states, and that the right to peaceably assemble in the First Amendment to the United States Constitution was not protected by the clause referred to except to petition the government for a redress of grievances. This decision was overruled in McDonald v. City of Chicago (2010).

== Background ==
In this 1886 case, Herman Presser was part of a citizen militia group, the Lehr und Wehr Verein (Instruct and Defend Association), a group of armed ethnic German workers, associated with the Socialist Labor Party. The group had been formed to counter the armed private armies of companies in Chicago.

The indictment charged in substance that Presser, on September 24, 1879, in the county of Cook, in the State of Illinois, "did unlawfully belong to, and did parade and drill in the city of Chicago with an unauthorized body of men with arms, who had associated themselves together as a military company and organization, without having a license from the Governor, and not being a part of, or belonging to, 'the regular organized volunteer militia' of the State of Illinois, or the troops of the United States." A motion to quash the indictment was overruled. Presser then pleaded not guilty, and both parties having waived a jury the case was tried by the court, which found Presser guilty and sentenced him to pay a fine of $10.

Basically, Presser,

In December 1879, marched at the head of said company, about four hundred in number, in the streets of the city of Chicago, he riding on horseback and in command; that the company was armed with rifles and Presser with a cavalry sword; that the company had no license from the governor of Illinois to drill or parade as a part of the militia of the State, and was not a part of the regular organized militia of the State, nor a part of troops of the United States, and had no organization under the militia law of the United States.

Presser claimed the law violated his rights under the Second Amendment.

== Decision ==
In Presser v. Illinois, the Supreme Court stated:

We think it clear that the sections under consideration, which only forbid bodies of men to associate together as military organizations, or to drill or parade with arms in cities and towns unless authorized by law, do not infringe the right of the people to keep and bear arms. But a conclusive answer to the contention that this amendment prohibits the legislation in question lies in the fact that the amendment is a limitation only upon the power of congress and the national government, and not upon that of the state.

In Presser, the Court reaffirmed its 1876 decision in Cruikshank that the Second Amendment acts as a limitation upon only the federal government and not the states. Cruikshank and Presser are consistently used by the lower courts to deny any recognition of individual rights claims and provides justification to state and local municipalities to pass laws that regulate guns.

However, the Court stated that there is a limit upon state restriction of firearms ownership in that they may not disarm the people to such an extent that there is no remaining armed militia force for the general government to call upon:

It is undoubtedly true that all citizens capable of bearing arms constitute the reserved military force or reserve militia of the United States as well as of the States, and in view of this prerogative of the general government, as well as of its general powers, the States cannot, even laying the constitutional provision in question out of view, prohibit the people from keeping and bearing arms, so as to deprive the United States of their rightful resource for maintaining the public security, and disable the people from performing their duty to the general government. But, as already stated, we think it clear that the sections under consideration do not have this effect.

The Court emphatically disposed of Presser's argument that there exists a right to assemble, drill, or march in a militia independent of authorization by state or federal law:

The right voluntarily to associate together as a military company or organization or to drill or parade with arms, without, and independent of, an act of Congress or law of the State authorizing the same, is not an attribute of national citizenship. Military organization and military drill and parade under arms are subjects especially under the control of the government of every country. They cannot be claimed as a right independent of law. Under our political system they are subject to the regulation and control of the State and Federal governments, acting in due regard to their respective prerogatives and powers. The Constitution and laws of the United States will be searched in vain for any support to the view that these rights are privileges and immunities of citizens of the United States independent of some specific legislation on the subject.

== Analysis ==
The traditional reading of Presser is that it affirms the states' rights view articulated in Cruikshank. Modern supporters of the individual rights view have challenged this claim, viewing the case as affirming a right to keep and bear arms as a necessary condition to have a universal militia. The conflict between the viewpoints was argued in court in 1982 in the case of Quilici v. Village of Morton Grove in which the United States Court of Appeals for the Seventh Circuit held:

As we have noted, the parties agree that Presser is controlling, but disagree as to what Presser held. It is difficult to understand how appellants can assert that Presser supports the theory that the second amendment right to keep and bear arms is a fundamental right which the state cannot regulate when the Presser decision plainly states that "[t]he Second Amendment declares that it shall not be infringed, but this ... means no more than that it shall not be infringed by Congress. This is one of the amendments that has no other effect than to restrict the powers of the National government ..."... As the district court explained in detail, appellants' claim that Presser supports the proposition that the second amendment guarantee of the right to keep and bear arms is not subject to state restriction is based on dicta quoted out of context ... This argument borders on the frivolous and does not warrant any further consideration.

== See also ==
- United States v. Cruikshank, 92 U.S. 542 (1875)
- District of Columbia v. Heller
- Nordyke v. King
- McDonald v. Chicago
