= United States v. Cruikshank =

1876 U.S. Supreme Court case

- Supreme Court of the United States

Argued March 30 – June 24, 1875 Decided March 27, 1876
- Full case name: United States v. Cruikshank, et al.
- Citations: 92 U.S. 542 (more) 2 Otto 542; 23 L. Ed. 588; 1875 U.S. LEXIS 1794

Holding
- The right of assembly under the First Amendment and the right to bear arms under the Second Amendment are only applicable to the federal government, not the states or private actors.

Court membership
- Chief Justice Morrison Waite Associate Justices Nathan Clifford · Noah H. Swayne; Samuel F. Miller · David Davis; Stephen J. Field · William Strong; Joseph P. Bradley · Ward Hunt

Case opinions
- Majority: Waite, joined by Swayne, Miller, Field, Strong, Davis, Bradley, Hunt
- Dissent: Clifford
- Abrogated by
- De Jonge v. Oregon (1937) (in part); McDonald v. City of Chicago (2010) (in part)

United States v. Cruikshank, 92 U.S. 542 (1876), was a landmark decision of the United States Supreme Court, ruling that the U.S. Bill of Rights did not limit the power of private actors or state governments despite the adoption of the Fourteenth Amendment. It reversed the federal criminal convictions for the civil rights violations committed in aid of anti-Reconstruction murders. Decided during the Reconstruction Era, the case represented a major defeat for federal efforts to protect the civil rights of African Americans.

The case developed from the strongly contested 1872 Louisiana gubernatorial election. Rival groups were sworn in at the same time at both the state and parish level. In Grant Parish the fight over who would be sheriff, Nash or Shaw, and judge, Cazabat or Register, turned into the Colfax Massacre on April 13, 1873. Dozens of Black freedmen and three white men were killed. The parish government that would normally prosecute the crimes was then run by the same group that carried them out. The only case brought was a federal indictment under the Enforcement Act of 1870. That law banned two or more people from plotting to take away anyone's constitutional rights. The charges included blocking the freedmen's First Amendment right to assemble freely and their Second Amendment right to keep and bear arms.

In his majority opinion, Chief Justice Morrison Waite reversed the convictions of the defendants, judging that the plaintiffs had to rely on Louisiana state courts for protection. Waite ruled that neither the First Amendment nor the Second Amendment limited the powers of state governments or individuals. He further ruled that the Due Process Clause and the Equal Protection Clause of the Fourteenth Amendment limited the lawful actions of state governments, but not of individuals. The decision left African Americans in the South at the mercy of increasingly hostile state governments dominated by white Democratic legislatures, and allowed groups such as the Ku Klux Klan to continue to use paramilitary force to suppress black voting.

Cruikshank was the first case to come before the Supreme Court that involved a possible violation of the Second Amendment. Decades after Cruikshank, the Supreme Court began incorporating the Bill of Rights to apply to state governments. The Court incorporated the First Amendment's freedom of assembly in De Jonge v. Oregon (1937), while the Second Amendment was incorporated in McDonald v. City of Chicago (2010).

== Background ==
On Sunday, April 13, 1873, an armed force of white men, led by Sheriff Nash and State rep Hadnot, overpowered Black freedmen and state militia occupying the Grant Parish courthouse in Colfax, Louisiana after the contested 1872 election for governor of Louisiana and local offices. The election results were still undetermined at the beginning of spring, and both Republican and Fusionists had certified their own candidates for the local offices of sheriff and justice of the peace. Federal troops reinforced the election of the Republican governor, William Pitt Kellogg.

At the massacre, most of the freedmen were killed after surrendering, and nearly another 50 were killed later that night after being held as prisoners for several hours. Estimates of the number of dead have varied over the years, ranging from 62 to 153; three whites died but the number of Black victims was difficult to determine because many bodies were thrown into the Red River or removed for burial, possibly at mass graves.

Some members of the white gangs were indicted and charged by the Enforcement Act of 1870. The Act had been designed primarily to allow Federal enforcement and prosecution of actions of the Ku Klux Klan and other secret vigilante groups against blacks, both for violence and murder and for preventing them from voting. Among other provisions, the law made it a felony for two or more people to conspire to deprive anyone of his constitutional rights. The white defendants were charged with sixteen counts, divided into two sets of eight each. Among the charges included violating the freedmen's rights to lawfully assemble, to vote, and to bear arms.

== Opinion of the Court ==
=== Majority opinion ===
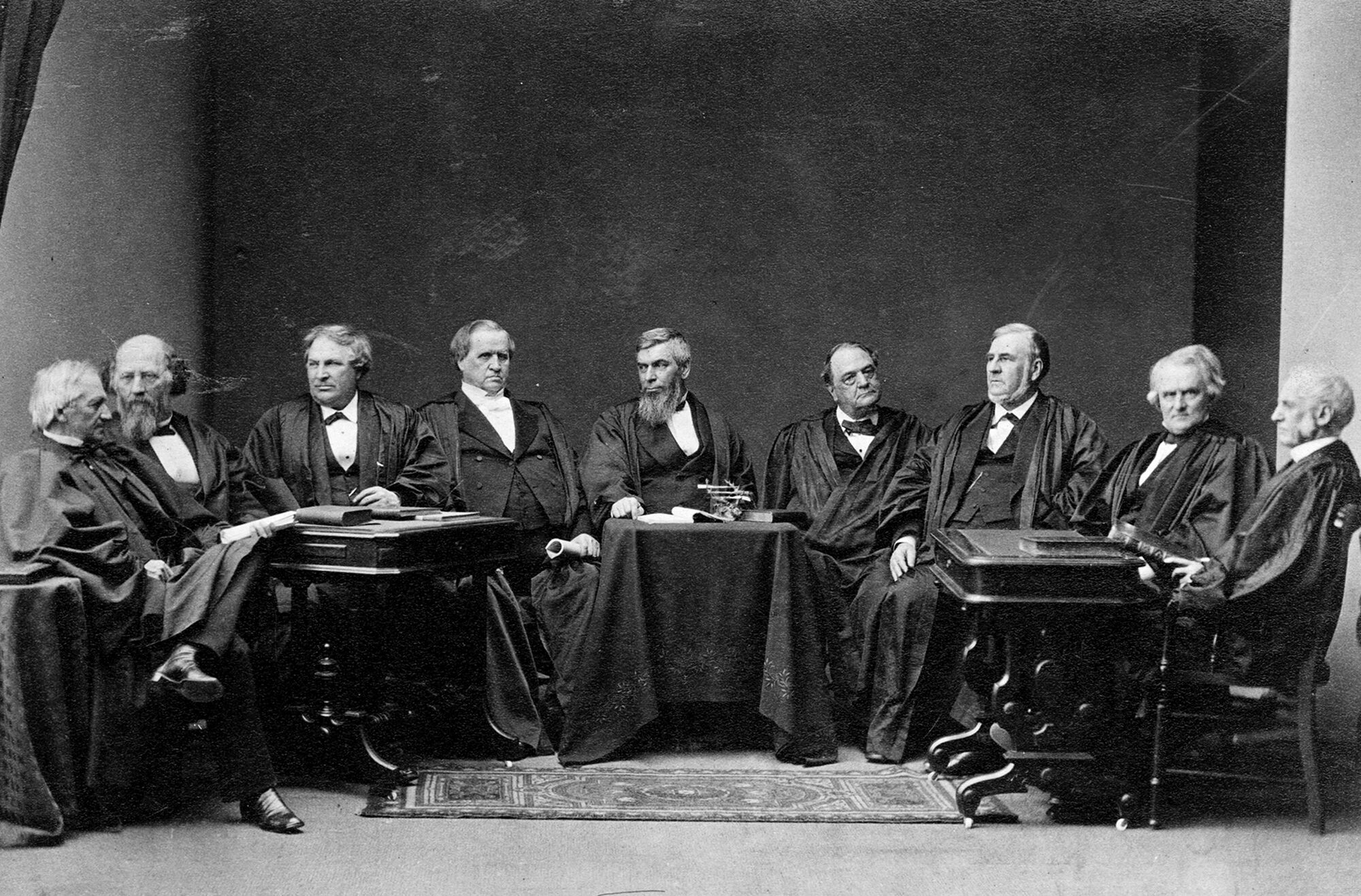
The Waite Court in 1876

The Supreme Court ruled on March 27, 1876, on a range of issues and found the indictment faulty. It reversed the convictions of the white defendants in the case. Chief Justice Morrison Waite authored the majority opinion.

In its ruling, the Court did not incorporate the Bill of Rights to the states. The Court opined about the dualistic nature of the U.S. political system:

There is in our political system a government of each of the several States, and a Government of the United States. Each is distinct from the others, and has citizens of its own who owe it allegiance, and whose rights, within its jurisdiction, it must protect. The same person may be at the same time a citizen of the United States and a citizen of a State, but his rights of citizenship under one of those governments will be different from those he has under the other.

The ruling said that all U.S. citizens are subject to two governments, their state government and the other the national government, and then defined the scope of each:

The Government of the United States, although it is, within the scope of its powers, supreme and beyond the States, can neither grant nor secure to its citizens rights or privileges which are not expressly or by implication placed under its jurisdiction. All that cannot be so granted or secured are left to the exclusive protection of the States.

The Court found that the First Amendment right to assembly "was not intended to limit the powers of the State governments in respect to their own citizens, but to operate upon the National Government alone," thus "for their protection in its enjoyment ... the people must look to the States. The power for that purpose was originally placed there, and it has never been surrendered to the United States".

In addition the Justices held that the Second Amendment restricts only the powers of the national government, and that it does not restrict private citizens from denying other citizens the right to keep and bear arms, or any other right in the Bill of Rights. The Justices held that the right of the people to keep and bear arms exists, and that it is a right that exists without the Constitution granting such a right, by stating "Neither is it [the right to keep and bear arms] in any manner dependent upon that instrument [the Constitution] for its existence." Their ruling was that citizens must look to "municipal legislation" when other citizens deprive them of such rights rather than the Constitution.

The right there specified is that of "bearing arms for a lawful purpose." This is not a right granted by the Constitution. Neither is it in any manner dependent upon that instrument for its existence. The second amendment declares that it shall not be infringed, but this, as has been seen, means no more than that it shall not be infringed by Congress. This is one of the amendments that has no other effect than to restrict the powers of the national government, leaving the people to look for their protection against any violation by their fellow citizens of the rights it recognizes, to what is called, in The City of New York v. Miln, 11 Pet. 139, the "powers which relate to merely municipal legislation, or what was, perhaps, more properly called internal police," "not surrendered or restrained" by the Constitution of the United States.

The Court also ruled that the Due Process and Equal Protection Clauses applied only to state action, and not to actions of individuals: "The fourteenth amendment prohibits a State from depriving any person of life, liberty, or property, without due process of law; but this adds nothing to the rights of one citizen as against another."

=== Dissenting opinion ===
Justice Clifford agreed with the other Justices to rescind the indictments but for entirely different reasons: he opined that section five of the 14th Amendment vested the federal government with the power to legislate the actions of individuals who restrict the constitutional rights of others, but he found that the indictments were worded too vaguely to allow the defendants to prepare an effective defense.

== Aftermath ==
African Americans in the South were left to the mercy of increasingly hostile state governments dominated by white Democratic legislatures; neither the legislatures, law enforcement, nor the courts worked to protect freedmen. As white Democrats regained power in the late 1870s, they struggled to suppress black Republican voting through intimidation and fraud at the polls. Paramilitary groups such as the Red Shirts acted on behalf of the Democrats to suppress black voting. In addition, from 1890 to 1908, 10 of the 11 former Confederate states passed disfranchising constitutions or amendments, with provisions for poll taxes, residency requirements, literacy tests, and grandfather clauses that effectively disfranchised most black voters and many poor white people. The disfranchisement also meant that black people could not serve on juries or hold any political office, which were restricted to voters; those who could not vote were excluded from the political system.

The Cruikshank ruling allowed groups such as the Ku Klux Klan to flourish and continue to use paramilitary force to suppress black voting. As white Democrats dominated the Southern legislatures, they ignored the violence and refused to allow African Americans any right to bear arms.

As constitutional commentator Leonard Levy later wrote in 1987, "Cruikshank paralyzed the federal government's attempt to protect black citizens by punishing violators of their Civil Rights and, in effect, shaped the Constitution to the advantage of the Ku Klux Klan". In 1966, (United States v. Price; United States v. Guest) the Court vitiated Cruikshank.

All five Justices of the majority had been appointed by Republicans (three by Lincoln, two by Grant). The lone Democratic appointee Nathan Clifford dissented.

== Continuing validity ==
Cruikshank has been cited for more than a century by supporters of restrictive state and local gun control laws such as the Sullivan Act.

Although significant portions of Cruikshank have been reversed by later decisions, most notably the 5–4 McDonald v. City of Chicago ruling in 2010, it is still relied upon with some authority in other portions. Cruikshank and Presser v. Illinois, which reaffirmed it in 1886, are the only significant Supreme Court interpretations of the Second Amendment until the ambiguous United States v. Miller in 1939. Both preceded the court's general acceptance of the incorporation doctrine and have been questioned for that reason.

The majority opinion of the Supreme Court in District of Columbia v. Heller suggested that Cruikshank and the cases flowing from it would no longer be considered good law as a result of the radically changed opinion of the Fourteenth Amendment when that issue eventually comes before the courts:

With respect to Cruikshank's continuing validity on incorporation, a question not presented by this case, we note that Cruikshank also said that the First Amendment did not apply against the States and did not engage in the sort of Fourteenth Amendment inquiry required by our later cases. Our later decisions in Presser v. Illinois, 116 U. S. 252, 265 (1886) and Miller v. Texas, 153 U. S. 535, 538 (1894), reaffirmed that the Second Amendment applies only to the Federal Government.

This issue did come before the Supreme Court in McDonald v. Chicago (2010), in which the Supreme Court "reversed the Seventh Circuit, holding that the Fourteenth Amendment makes the Second Amendment right to keep and bear arms for the purpose of self-defense applicable to the states."

Regarding this assertion in Heller that Cruikshank said the first amendment did not apply against the states, Professor David Rabban wrote Cruikshank "never specified whether the First Amendment contains 'fundamental rights' protected by the Fourteenth Amendment against state action".

The Civil Rights Cases (1883) and Justice Rehnquist's opinion for the majority in United States v. Morrison (2000) referred to the Cruikshank state action doctrine.

== See also ==
- List of United States Supreme Court cases, volume 92
- Jim Crow laws
