= Protect Illinois Communities Act =

Assault weapon ban

The Protect Illinois Communities Act (formally known as Public Act 102–1116) is an assault weapons ban signed into Illinois law on January 10, 2023, by Governor J. B. Pritzker, going into immediate effect. The Act bans the sale and distribution of assault weapons, high-capacity magazines, and switches in Illinois. On August 11, 2023, the Illinois Supreme Court upheld the law, stating that it is constitutional and does not "deny equal protection nor constitute special legislation." On November 3, 2023, a federal appeals court upheld the prohibition. On December 14, 2023, the Supreme Court of the United States declined to block the law from going into effect on January 1, 2024. However, a federal judge granted this request eleven months later on November 8, 2024. To give the state time to appeal, he left 30 days before his ruling went into effect.

== See also ==
- Gun laws in Illinois
- FOID
- McDonald v. Chicago
- Moore v. Madigan
- People v. Aguilar
