= Gun laws in Illinois =

Location of Illinois in the United States

Gun laws in Illinois regulate the sale, possession, and use of firearms and ammunition in the state of Illinois in the United States.

To legally possess firearms or ammunition, Illinois residents must have a Firearm Owners Identification (FOID) card, which is issued by the Illinois State Police on a shall-issue basis. Non-residents who may legally possess firearms in their home state are exempt from this requirement.

The state police issue licenses for the concealed carry of handguns to qualified applicants age 21 or older who pass a 16-hour training course. However, any law enforcement agency can object to an individual being granted a license "based upon a reasonable suspicion that the applicant is a danger to himself or herself or others, or a threat to public safety". Objections are considered by a Concealed Carry Licensing Review Board, which decides whether or not the license will be issued, based on "a preponderance of the evidence". Licenses issued by other states are not recognized, except for carry in a vehicle. Open carry is prohibited in most areas. When a firearm is being transported by a person without a concealed carry license, it must be unloaded and enclosed in a case, or broken down in a non-functioning state, or not immediately accessible.

Private sales of firearms must be done through a gun dealer with a Federal Firearms License (FFL). Lost or stolen guns must be reported to the police. There is a waiting period of 72 hours to take possession after purchasing a firearm. Possession of automatic firearms, short-barreled shotguns, or suppressors is prohibited. Possession of short-barreled rifles is permitted only for those who have an ATF Curios and Relics license or are a member of a military reenactment group.

As of January 10, 2023, the state bans the sale of firearms that have been defined as assault weapons, but allows the possession of any that were registered with the state police by January 1, 2024. The sale of rifle magazines that can hold more than 10 rounds or handgun magazines that can hold more than 15 rounds is prohibited. These restrictions are being challenged in various state and federal courts.

Illinois has state preemption for certain areas of gun law, which overrides the home rule guideline in those cases. Some local governments have enacted ordinances that are more restrictive than those of the state in areas not covered by state preemption.

== Summary table ==
Subject / law	Long guns	Handguns	Relevant statutes	Notes
State permit required to purchase?	Yes	Yes	430 ILCS 65	FOID (Firearm Owner's Identification) card required.
Owner permit required?	Yes	Yes	430 ILCS 65	FOID card required.
Firearm registration?	Partial	Partial	720 ILCS 5/24-1.9	Firearms legally defined as assault weapons possessed within Illinois before January 10, 2023, must have been registered with the state police before January 1, 2024.
License required for concealed carry?	N/A	Yes	430 ILCS 66	Shall-issue with limited discretion. Concealed carry licenses are issued by the state police. Licenses issued by other states are not recognized (except for vehicle carry), but nonresidents from states with "substantially similar" licensing requirements can apply for an Illinois nonresident license.
Open carry allowed?	No	No	720 ILCS 5/24-1	
Vehicle carry allowed?	No	Yes	430 ILCS 66	An Illinois concealed carry license is required for Illinois residents. Non-residents may carry in a vehicle if they are eligible to carry in their home state. If their home state issues licenses or permits (even if that state allows permitless carry), a license or permit is required.
State preemption of local restrictions?	Partial	Partial	430 ILCS 66	Preemption for the regulation and transportation of handguns and handgun ammunition. Preemption for laws regulating assault weapons, unless enacted before July 20, 2013.
Assault weapon law?	Yes	Yes	720 ILCS 5/24-1.9	The sale of firearms defined as assault weapons is prohibited as of January 10, 2023. Existing assault weapons are grandfathered in if registered with the state police by January 1, 2024. These restrictions are being challenged in various state and federal courts. Some local governments have banned the possession of assault weapons, prior to the preemption deadline of July 20, 2013.
Magazine capacity restriction?	Yes	Yes	720 ILCS 5/24-1.9	Limit of 10 rounds for long guns and 15 rounds for handguns as of January 10, 2023. These restrictions are being challenged in various state and federal courts. Some local governments have enacted additional restrictions.
NFA weapons restricted?	Yes	Yes	720 ILCS 5/24-1; 720 ILCS 5/24-2	Automatic firearms, short-barreled shotguns, and suppressors prohibited. Short-barreled rifles allowed only for Curios and Relics license holders or members of a bona fide military reenactment group. AOW (Any Other Weapon) and large-bore DD (Destructive Device) allowed with proper approval and tax stamp from ATF.
Castle doctrine / stand your ground laws?	Partial	Partial	720 ILCS 5	Illinois has no stand-your-ground law, however there is also no duty to retreat. The use of force is justified when a person reasonably believes that it is necessary "to prevent imminent death or great bodily harm to himself or another, or the commission of a forcible felony." There are some additional protections for defense against unlawful entry into a dwelling.
Peaceable journey laws?	Partial	Yes	430 ILCS 66	Illinois has state preemption for the transportation of handguns and handgun ammunition. Non-Illinois residents are granted a limited exception to lawfully carry a concealed firearm within a vehicle if they are eligible to carry a firearm in public under the laws of their own state, "as evidenced by the possession of a concealed carry license or permit issued by his or her state of residence." Non-residents who are permitted to possess a firearm in their own state are not required to have a FOID card. Some localities have banned the possession of assault weapons.
Background checks required for private sales?	Yes	Yes	430 ILCS 65	Private sales of firearms must be done through a gun dealer with a Federal Firearms License (FFL).
Red flag law?	Yes	Yes	430 ILCS 65; 430 ILCS 67	Family members, police, or state's attorneys can petition a judge to issue an order to confiscate the firearms of a person deemed an immediate and present danger to themselves or others. The person's firearms must be returned to them within one year unless the court finds grounds to renew the suspension. Law enforcement officers, school administrators, physicians, and mental health professionals can file a clear and present danger report with the Department of Human Services and Illinois State Police, which will revoke the FOID card of a person who communicates a serious threat of physical violence or demonstrates threatening physical or verbal behavior. Subjects of such reports must undergo a psychological evaluation to prove they are not a danger to themselves or others if they wish to obtain a FOID card or to have a revoked FOID card reinstated.
Waiting period?	Yes	Yes	720 ILCS 5/24-3	After purchasing a firearm, the waiting period before the buyer can take possession is 72 hours.
"Ghost guns" banned?	Yes	Yes	720 ILCS 5/24-1	All firearms are required to have a serial number.
Minimum age to purchase or possess?	No	Yes	720 ILCS 5/24-3	Illinois prohibits any person under age 18 from possessing a handgun. (Federal law prohibits persons under 18 from purchasing long guns, and persons under 21 from purchasing handguns.)

== FOID cards ==
To legally possess or purchase firearms or ammunition, Illinois residents must have a Firearm Owner's Identification (FOID) card, which is issued by the Illinois State Police. The police may issue FOID cards to eligible applicants. An applicant is disqualified if he or she has been convicted of a felony or an act of domestic violence, is the subject of an order of protection, has been convicted of assault or battery, has been a patient in a mental institution within the last five years, has been adjudicated as a mental defective, or is an illegal immigrant. Applicants under the age of 21 must have the written consent of a parent or legal guardian who is also legally able to possess firearms.

When a firearm is sold or transferred, the buyer is required to present their FOID card. The seller must perform an automated dial-up check with the State Police, to verify that the FOID card is valid, and to redo the background check of the buyer. This additional checking is known as the Firearm Transfer Inquiry Program (FTIP).

The buyer is also required to present their FOID card when purchasing ammunition.

A FOID card does not authorize the carrying of a concealed firearm, but having a FOID card is a prerequisite for obtaining a concealed carry license.

In 2011, in the case of People v. Holmes, the Illinois Supreme Court ruled that non-Illinois residents who are permitted to possess a firearm in their home state are not required to have an Illinois FOID card. Non-Illinois residents do not qualify to obtain a FOID card, but the FOID statute does make provisions for applicants who are employed in Illinois as law enforcement officers, armed security officers, or by the U.S. military.

On February 14, 2018, in a ruling that applies only to the defendant, a circuit court in Illinois found that the requirement to obtain a FOID card in order to acquire or possess a firearm is unconstitutional. The court ruled that "to require the defendant to fill out a form, provide a picture ID and pay a $10 fee to obtain a FOID card before she can exercise her constitutional right to self-defense with a firearm is a violation of the Second Amendment... and a violation of Article I, Section 22, of the Constitution of the State of Illinois." After the state requested reconsideration, the court ruled on October 16, 2018 that, in addition to reaffirming its previous ruling, the requirement to physically possess a FOID while in possession of a firearm is also unconstitutional. The case, People v Brown, was appealed to the Illinois Supreme Court. The Illinois Supreme Court determined that the case could have reached the same result without presenting a constitutional issue. The circuit court was directed to present a modified judgment that excludes the constitutional finding.

== Concealed and open carry ==
The Illinois State Police Department issues licenses for the concealed carry of handguns to qualified applicants age 21 or older who pass a 16-hour training course. Illinois law says that the state police "shall issue" a license to a qualified applicant. However, any law enforcement agency can object to an individual being granted a license "based upon a reasonable suspicion that the applicant is a danger to himself or herself or others, or a threat to public safety". Objections are considered by a Concealed Carry Licensing Review Board, which decides whether or not the license will be issued, based on "a preponderance of the evidence". Under revised rules implemented in July 2014, the Review Board notifies the applicant by mail of the basis of the objection and identifies the agency that brought it.

In order to apply for a license the applicant must have in their possession the certificate from the required training, a valid drivers license or state ID card, a valid FOID card, a head and shoulder electronic photograph taken in the last 30 days, ten years of documented residency, fingerprints (optional, but submitting an application without prints increases the potential processing time from 90 to 120 days), and the application fee.

Permits cost $150 for residents or $300 for non-residents, and are valid for five years. An Illinois resident is defined as someone who qualifies for an Illinois driver's license or state identification card due to establishment of a primary domicile in Illinois. A non-resident is someone who has not resided in Illinois for more than 30 days and resides in another state or territory.

Non-residents may apply if their state is on a list of states with laws related to firearm ownership, possession, and carrying, that are "substantially similar" to the requirements to obtain a carry license in Illinois. A non-resident applicant must also possess a carry license or permit from his or her state of residence, if applicable. Prior to February 2017, the Illinois State Police considered only Hawaii, New Mexico, South Carolina, and Virginia to qualify as substantially similar. In February 2017, the list of substantially similar states changed to Arkansas, Mississippi, Texas, and Virginia. Idaho and Nevada were added to the list in 2020. Illinois concealed carry licensees from the three states removed from the list of approved states received letters stating that their Illinois licenses were no longer valid.

Concealed carry permits or licenses issued by other states are not recognized, except that non-residents in possession of a carry permit or license from their home state may carry in a vehicle while traveling through Illinois.

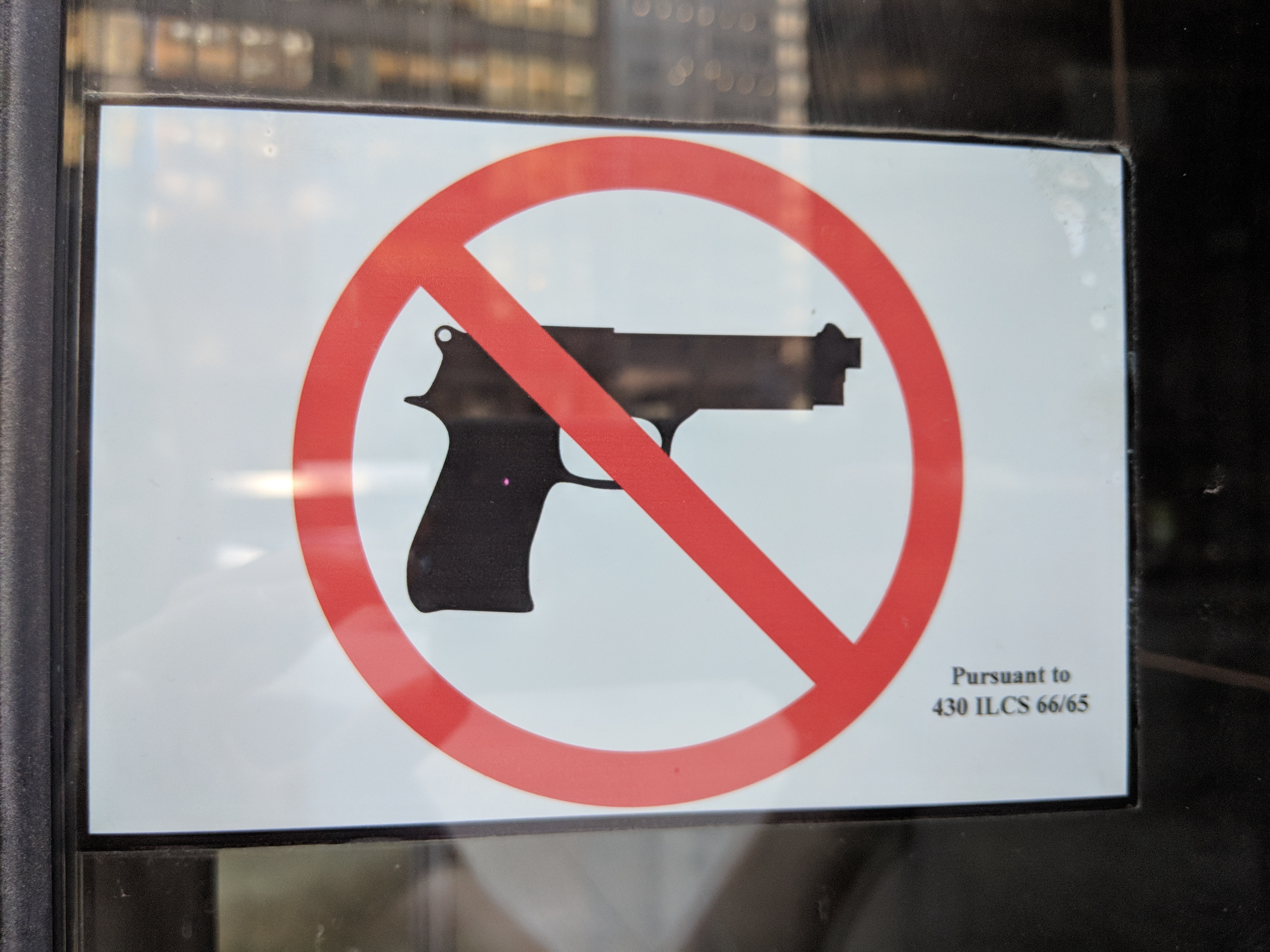
Illinois property owners may prohibit concealed carry with a sign.

Concealed carry is prohibited on public transportation, at a bar or restaurant that gets more than half its revenue from the sale of alcohol, at a public gathering or special event that requires a permit (e.g. a street fair or festival), at a place where alcohol is sold for special events, and on private property where the owner has chosen not to allow it (and, unless the property is a private residence, has posted an appropriate sign). Concealed carry is also not allowed at any school, college or university, preschool or daycare facility, government building, courthouse, prison, jail, detention facility, hospital, playground, park, Cook County Forest Preserve area, stadium or arena for college or professional sports, amusement park, riverboat casino, off-track betting facility, library, zoo, museum, airport, nuclear facility, or place where firearms are prohibited under federal law. However, concealed carry license holders who are in the parking lot of a prohibited location (except a nuclear facility) are allowed to carry a concealed firearm when they are in their vehicle, and to store their gun locked in their vehicle and out of plain view. On February 1, 2018, the Illinois Supreme Court unanimously ruled that the state's ban on possession of a firearm within 1,000 feet of a public park was unconstitutional. On June 14, 2018, the Illinois Appellate Court ruled the law banning carrying firearms within 1,000 feet of a school to be unconstitutional.

When a license holder is carrying a concealed handgun, and is asked by a police officer if they are carrying, there is a duty to inform the officer that they are. This can be done with a verbal reply, or by showing their concealed handgun license.

In accordance with federal law, persons who have been convicted of a felony, or of a misdemeanor act of domestic violence, are ineligible to receive a concealed carry license. In Illinois persons who, within the last five years, have been convicted of a misdemeanor involving the use of force or violence, or received two convictions for driving under the influence of alcohol or drugs, or been in residential or court-ordered treatment for substance abuse, are also ineligible to receive a license. There are other conditions that make an applicant ineligible under state law, including having been a patient in a mental health facility in the last five years.

In compliance with the federal Law Enforcement Officers Safety Act, off-duty and retired police officers who qualify annually under state guidelines are allowed to carry concealed.

Open carry of firearms is generally illegal, except when hunting, or on one's own land, or in one's own dwelling or fixed place of business, or on the land or in the dwelling or fixed place of business of another person with that person's permission.

When a firearm is being transported it must be (a) unloaded and enclosed in a case, firearm carrying box, shipping box, or other container, or (b) broken down in a non-functioning state, or (c) not immediately accessible, or (d) carried or possessed in accordance with the Firearm Concealed Carry Act by a person with a valid concealed carry license.

On June 14, 2018, the Illinois Appellate Court said that the mere possession of a gun does not constitute probable cause for arrest.

=== Historical state prohibition of concealed carry ===
Illinois was the last state to pass a law to allow the concealed carry of firearms by citizens. The state's original handgun carry ban was enacted in 1949, with the ban's most recent revision being enacted in 1962. The pre-existing law forbade concealed carry, and generally prohibited open carry, except in counties that had enacted ordinances allowing open carry. On December 11, 2012, a three-judge panel of the U.S. Seventh Circuit Court of Appeals, in the case of Moore v. Madigan, ruled that Illinois' concealed carry ban was unconstitutional, and gave the state 180 days to change its laws. Subsequently, the court granted a 30-day extension of the deadline. On July 9, 2013, Illinois enacted the Firearm Concealed Carry Act, which established a system for the issuing of concealed carry licenses. On September 12, 2013, the Illinois Supreme Court, in the case of People v. Aguilar, also ruled that the state's Aggravated Unlawful Use of a Weapon law, which completely prohibited concealed carry, was unconstitutional. On January 5, 2014, the state police began accepting applications for licenses to carry concealed handguns. On February 28, 2014, the state police announced that they had begun issuing concealed carry licenses.

== Other state laws ==
Article 1 section 22 of the Illinois Constitution states, "Subject only to the police power, the right of the individual citizen to keep and bear arms shall not be infringed."

Private sales of firearms must be done through a gun dealer with a Federal Firearms License (FFL).

When purchasing a firearm in Illinois there is a 72-hour waiting period after the sale before the buyer can take possession.

Lost or stolen guns must be reported to the police within 48 hours.

A gun owner can be charged with a crime if a minor under the age of 14 gains access to their firearm when it is unsecured (i.e. not locked in a box or secured with a trigger lock) and causes death or great bodily harm.

Under a law passed on January 10, 2023, Illinois has defined certain firearms as assault weapons. It is illegal to manufacture, deliver, sell, or purchase an assault weapon. Any assault weapons that are already owned by residents are legal to possess if registered with the state police by January 1, 2024. In Illinois assault weapons include any centerfire semi-automatic rifle with a detachable magazine and one or more of these features: a pistol grip, a thumbhole stock, a folding or telescoping stock, a forward grip, a flash suppressor, a barrel shroud, or a grenade launcher. A number of other rifles, shotguns, and pistols are also defined as assault weapons, including some specific makes and models. Not defined as assault weapons but similarly restricted are .50 caliber rifles.

The law banning the sale of assault weapons has been the subject of a number of challenges in state and federal courts. At the state level, on January 20, 2023, a circuit court issued a temporary restraining order against the law, which was upheld on appeal; in the following weeks, several other circuit courts issued similar orders. On May 16, the Illinois Supreme Court heard a consolidated case challenging the law. On August 11, 2023, in a 4–3 decision, the Illinois Supreme Court ruled that the assault weapons ban does not violate the state constitution. At the federal level, on February 17, 2023, a federal judge denied a motion to block the law, calling it "constitutionally sound". On April 25, a second federal judge declined to block the law. On April 28, a third judge blocked the law statewide, but on May 4 the block was put on hold by an appellate judge. On May 17, the U.S. Supreme Court declined to issue a temporary injunction against the ban on sales of assault weapons. On June 29, a three-judge panel of the 7th U.S. Circuit Court of Appeals heard a consolidated case challenging the law. On November 3, 2023, the appeals court ruled that the law does not violate the Second Amendment. On December 14, 2023, and on July 2, 2024, the U.S. Supreme court again refused to block the law. On November 8, 2024, a federal judge ruled that the assault weapons ban is unconstitutional. On December 5, 2024, a three-judge panel of the 7th Circuit Court of Appeals kept the law in place pending further appeals. On July 9, 2026, in Barnett v. Raoul a federal appeals court overturned the lower court's ruling, ruling that Illinois's assault weapons ban does not violate the Second Amendment. Additional challenges are in progress in state and federal courts. The Supreme Court has agreed to hear Viramontes v. Cook County and Grant v. Higgins, on December 2, 2026.

Some local governments have banned the possession of assault weapons, prior to the preemption deadline of July 20, 2013 (see below). On June 30, 2026, the U.S. Supreme Court agreed to consider Viramontes v. Cook County, a challenge to Cook County's assault weapons ban. The Court consolidated it with Grant v. Higgins, a challenge to Connecticut's ban, for one hour of oral argument.

It is illegal to manufacture, deliver, sell, or purchase a magazine for a rifle or shotgun that holds more than 10 rounds of ammunition, or a magazine for a handgun that holds more than 15 rounds. The possession of such magazines is legal only on private property such as a home or gun range, or when traveling to or from such a location. The magazine capacity restrictions are part of the same law, passed on January 10, 2023, that barred the sale of assault weapons, and are subject to the same legal challenges described above.

Regarding Title II weapons, the possession of automatic firearms (such as machine guns), short-barreled shotguns, and suppressors is prohibited. Possession of short-barreled rifles is allowed for ATF Curios and Relics license holders, or, if the rifle is historically accurate has an overall length of at least 26 inches, for members of a bona fide military reenactment group. While possession of a large-bore destructive device itself is not prohibited, possession of an artillery projectile, shell, or grenade with over 1/4 ounce of explosive is prohibited. There is no prohibition against non-sporting shotguns (such as the Armsel Striker) deemed destructive devices by the ATF, nor is there one for AOWs (Any Other Weapons). There is a specific prohibition against the possession of firearms designed to appear as a wireless telephone. On November 25, 2022, a lawsuit that was later consolidated with another one, both of which challenge the suppressor ban, was filed.

In Illinois, muzzleloaders and black powder guns are considered firearms.

Illinois has no stand-your-ground law, but there is also no duty to retreat. The use of force is justified when a person reasonably believes that it is necessary "to prevent imminent death or great bodily harm to himself or another, or the commission of a forcible felony." There are some additional protections for defense against unlawful entry into a dwelling.

Illinois has a red flag law that allows family members, police, or state's attorneys to petition a judge to issue an order to confiscate the firearms of a person deemed an immediate and present danger to themselves or others. The petitioner must prove by clear and convincing evidence that the person poses a danger by having a firearm. The hearing for issuing the order may be done without the person being present, but the person may then request a hearing, to be held within two weeks, where they may defend themselves. If the order of confiscation is upheld, the person's guns may be taken away, and their FOID card suspended, for up to one year. After that the person's guns must be returned to them, and their FOID card reinstated, unless the court finds grounds to renew the suspension.

If a qualified medical examiner, law enforcement official, or school administrator determines that a gun owner's mental state makes them "a clear and present danger" to themselves or to others, they must report this to the Illinois State Police (ISP) within 24 hours. The ISP may then revoke the person's Firearm Owners Identification (FOID) card, making them ineligible to legally possess firearms.

Building, selling, or possessing privately made firearms without serial numbers – so-called "ghost guns" – is banned in Illinois.

The state prohibits the sale or possession of "switches". These are devices that can be used to convert a gun to full-automatic fire, where more than one round is fired when the trigger is pulled one time.

Firearm dealers must be licensed by the state. To obtain a state license, a gun store must submit proof that it has a Federal Firearms License. The store must have surveillance equipment, maintain an electronic inventory, establish anti-theft measures, and require employees to receive training annually.

In August 2023, Illinois passed a law banning the advertising of guns in a way that targets minors or encourages illegal paramilitary activity. The same law allows lawsuits against businesses that fail to take steps to prevent illegal sales such as those to straw purchasers. The law is being challenged in court.

When a firearm is sold by a licensed dealer, the seller is required to provide a gun lock, unless the firearm itself includes an integrated locking mechanism.

It is illegal to sell, import, or manufacture a handgun "having a barrel, slide, frame or receiver which is a die casting of zinc alloy or any other nonhomogeneous metal which will melt or deform at a temperature of less than 800 degrees Fahrenheit." Private sales are exempt from this restriction, and it is legal to possess such a gun.

== Local laws ==
Illinois has state preemption of firearm laws for "the regulation, licensing, possession, and registration of handguns and ammunition for a handgun, and the transportation of any firearm and ammunition". There is also state preemption for "the regulation of the possession and ownership of assault weapons", except for laws passed before July 20, 2013, which are grandfathered in. In other areas of gun law, some local governments have passed ordinances that are more restrictive than those of the state.

Chicago has banned the possession of certain semi-automatic firearms that it defines as assault weapons, as well as laser sights. Chicago residents must "immediately" report a firearm that is stolen or lost, and must report the transfer of a firearm within 48 hours of such transfer. In a home where a person younger than 18 is present, all guns must be secured with a trigger lock, or stored in a locked container, or secured to the body of the legal owner.

Chicago formerly prohibited the sale of firearms within city limits, but on January 6, 2014, a federal judge ruled that this was unconstitutional. The judge granted the city's request for six months to pass new laws regulating gun shops. On June 25, 2014, the city council passed a new law, allowing gun stores but restricting them to certain limited areas of the city, requiring that all gun sales be videotaped, and limiting buyers to one gun per 30-day period. Store owners must make their records available to the police, and employees must be trained to identify possible straw purchasers. With the passage of the gun shop ordinance, Chicago also struck a previous ban on the transfer of ammunition. On January 18, 2017, a federal appeals court ruled that the city's revised gun shop law was unconstitutional.

Cook County has banned the possession of certain semi-automatic firearms that it has defined as assault weapons. Residents must report to the county sheriff within 48 hours any firearms that are stolen, lost, destroyed, or sold or otherwise transferred. The sheriff may share this information with other law enforcement agencies. Licensed firearms dealers must provide information to the county regarding purchasers and the guns they purchase, and receive approval before conducting sales. An individual may not purchase more than one firearm in a 30-day period. In a home where a person younger than 21 is present, all guns must be secured with a trigger lock, or stored unloaded in a locked container separate from the ammunition, or secured to the body of the legal owner. In Cook County, local laws, such as those of Chicago, take precedence over county laws that regulate similar matters. Cook County imposes a twenty-five dollar tax on the sale of any firearm by a retail dealer, in addition to the usual county sales tax. The county also has a tax on the sale of ammunition — five cents per round for centerfire ammunition and one cent per round for rimfire ammunition.

The possession of firearms that have been variously defined as assault weapons is also illegal in Lincolnwood, Skokie, Evanston, Highland Park, North Chicago, Melrose Park, Riverdale, Dolton, Hazel Crest, Homewood, and the part of Buffalo Grove that's in Cook County. The storage or transportation of assault weapons is restricted in Morton Grove, Winnetka, Country Club Hills, and University Park. Sales and transfers of assault weapons are prohibited in Niles, and commercial sales are banned in Naperville. In December 2015, the U.S. Supreme Court declined to hear the case of Friedman v. Highland Park, a challenge to that city's assault weapons ban. Deerfield had passed an ordinance in 2013 that regulated the storage and transportation of assault weapons and high capacity magazines; in April 2018 the ordinance was amended to ban possession. In June 2018 the law was blocked from going into effect by a Lake County Circuit Court judge who held that the ordinance violates a state preemption statute; in March 2019 the judge ruled that the law was invalid, and permanently barred the village from enforcing it. In December 2020, a state appellate court overturned the ruling, allowing the ban to go into effect. In November 2021 the Illinois Supreme Court let this ruling stand by a vote of 3 to 3.

The East St. Louis Housing Authority's ban on firearm possession by residents of public housing was struck down by a federal judge on April 11, 2019.

Other municipalities have also enacted various firearm restrictions.

Some counties have adopted Second Amendment sanctuary resolutions in opposition to some gun control laws.

=== Historical restrictions on the possession of handguns ===
Formerly some Illinois municipalities had laws restricting the possession of handguns.

By the late 1980s, several Illinois municipalities had banned the possession of handguns. Chicago required the registration of all firearms but did not allow handguns to be registered, which had the effect of outlawing their possession, unless they were grandfathered in by being registered before April 16, 1982. Additionally, several Chicago suburbs had enacted outright prohibitions on handgun possession.

On June 26, 2008, the U.S. Supreme Court struck down Washington, D.C.'s handgun ban in the case of District of Columbia v. Heller. Chicago and the other municipalities came under legal pressure to change their laws. In the months following the Heller decision, handgun bans were repealed in the suburbs of Wilmette, Morton Grove, Evanston, and Winnetka, but Chicago and Oak Park kept their laws in effect.

On June 28, 2010, in the case of McDonald v. Chicago, the U.S. Supreme Court ruled the handgun bans of Chicago and Oak Park to be unconstitutional.

On July 12, 2010, a new Chicago city ordinance took effect that allowed the possession of handguns with certain restrictions. Residents were required to obtain a Chicago Firearms Permit. To get the permit they were required to complete a 5-hour firearms training course, pass a background check (including fingerprinting), and pay a $100 permit fee. Chicago's gun registration requirement was retained, with new registrations being allowed for the first time since 1982. Possession of firearms was permitted only inside a dwelling, not in a garage or on the outside grounds of the property. Only one gun at a time was allowed to be kept in a usable state.

On July 19, 2010, Oak Park amended its town ordinance to allow handgun possession in one's home, leaving no remaining town in Illinois that completely banned handguns.

On July 9, 2013, Illinois enacted the Firearm Concealed Carry Act, which set up a permitting system for the concealed carry of firearms. Another provision of this law is state preemption for "the regulation, licensing, possession, and registration of handguns and ammunition for a handgun, and the transportation of any firearm and ammunition". This invalidated Chicago's requirements for gun registration and for an additional permit for the possession of firearms.

On September 11, 2013, the Chicago City Council repealed the law requiring the registration of firearms and the law requiring a city issued firearm owners permit. They also changed the law to allow the carrying of firearms on the grounds of one's property outside as well as inside the home.

== Air guns ==
In Illinois, air guns that are larger than .18 caliber and that have a muzzle velocity greater than 700 feet per second are regulated as firearms.

== Tasers and stun guns ==
To purchase or possess a Taser or stun gun, a Firearm Owners Identification (FOID) card is required. There is a 24-hour waiting period between purchase and taking possession. On March 21, 2019, the Illinois Supreme Court ruled unanimously that the ban on carrying Tasers or stun guns in public violated the Second Amendment and was therefore unconstitutional. The court stated that Tasers and stun guns are not covered under the state's concealed carry laws. It also said that since Tasers and stun guns are less lethal than firearms, they are entitled to at least as much legal protection.

== Knives ==
In Illinois, it is illegal to possess a throwing star or ballistic knife. A knife with a blade more than 3 in (76 mm) in length is considered a dangerous weapon, and it is illegal to carry such a knife with an intent to inflict harm on another person's well-being.

Some local governments have knife laws that are more restrictive than those of the state. In Chicago, it is illegal to carry a knife with a blade more than 2.5 in (64 mm) in length.

== See also ==
- FOID (firearms)
- Law of Illinois
- McDonald v. Chicago
- Moore v. Madigan
- People v. Aguilar
