= Karina's Law =

Karina's Law (House Bill 4144) is an Illinois law that allows the court system to order the seizure of firearms and individual firearm parts that may be assembled into a firearm from a respondent with an Order of Protection. This includes giving judges the ability to require guns to be surrendered to law enforcement during initial contact when serving an emergency order of protection. The law is named after Karina Gonzalez, who was shot and killed with her 15-year-old daughter, Daniela, by Gonzalez's husband in 2023. Gonzalez had an order of protection against her husband, and this affected his ability to legally possess his firearms. However, he still had access to a gun and shot his two children and wife, with his wife and daughter passing on July 3rd, 2023. Governor JB Pritzker signed Karina's Law into law in February 2025, and it took effect in May 2025.

For a judge to grant the firearm removal portion of a petition, the respondent must be found to pose a credible threat to the petitioner and that this credible threat is immediate and present. Furthermore, it must be found that probable cause exists that the respondent has firearms or firearm parts and that the firearm(s) are located at the property to be searched. Karina’s Law does not require the respondent to have used or threatened the petitioner with a firearm to grant the removal. While it is common for the petitioner to have limited information about the type and location of the firearms, some specific knowledge is needed to grant this part of the petition. Size, Color, and anticipated location of the gun within the property are helpful, but it may be possible to get a warrant without them. However, the petitioner will need to identify an address or vehicle description of where they believe the guns are located.

To ask for the firearm removal to be considered with your petition for an order of protection, one needs to specifically indicate this on the paperwork. A petitioner for an order of protection must check off whether they request a surrender order, where the respondent is made to surrender their firearms, or ask for a search warrant to allow law enforcement to seize the respondent’s firearm. If firearm removal is granted, the respondent is required to surrender their firearms within 24 hours of the service of the order of protection. After requesting firearm removal, if a search warrant is not included on the petition, the surrender order is the default

The changes in Karina’s Law regarding surrendering or seizing firearms apply to orders of protection in civil and criminal court. The court can only issue the firearm remedy without notice to the respondent first if it determines that harm is likely to occur if the respondent is given prior notice and that a search warrant cannot be issued without probable cause.

The law aims to further protect survivors of domestic violence by removing guns from the homes of alleged abusers. Previously, respondents were prohibited from possessing firearms if they were subject to a plenary order of protection. However, firearms were not required to be surrendered, and no enforcement mechanisms were in place for removals. Rather, if someone had a Firearm Owner Identification Card (FOID), the respondent had 48 hours to complete self-attested forms called “disposition records” and confirm that they were no longer in possession of their firearms. However, data collected by the state of Illinois stated that the majority of respondents did not previously comply, meaning they still had their firearms in their possession.

It also closed several different loopholes that made it unclear who was responsible for removing guns from domestic violence situations and the corresponding protocols. Beyond giving judges the option to require the surrendering of firearms, it also allowed for judges to issue a search warrant to ensure consistent enforcement of their removal. This closed the loophole of the “honor system” in turning over legally owned firearms to police or different FOID card holders. Previous language also did not address illegally owned firearms. By ensuring proper removal proceedings, Karina’s law also ended the transfer of firearms to any other FOID card holder within the residence of the respondent. Overall, it provided language for how the seizure of firearms would function after a search warrant could be granted by a judge.
