= San Francisco Proposition H (2005) =

Proposed firearm reform in San Francisco, US

Proposition H was a local ordinance on the November 8, 2005 ballot in San Francisco, California, which gained national attention for its banning of most firearms within the city. The measure passed with a yes vote of 123,033 to a no vote of 89,856. The proposition was later struck down in court.

== Proposition summary ==
Proposition H sought to restrict handgun possession among San Francisco residents within city limits to police and certain security professionals, and to ban the manufacture, distribution, sale and transfer of firearms and ammunition within the city. Limited exceptions to the proposition would have allowed residents to possess handguns only if required for specific professional purposes. For example, San Francisco residents who are security guards, peace officers, or active members of the U.S. armed forces would be permitted to possess handguns while on duty. The San Francisco Board of Supervisors enacted penalties for violation of this ordinance, including mandatory jail time. Until April 1, 2006, residents would have been able to surrender their handguns to any district station of the San Francisco Police Department or the San Francisco Sheriff's Department without penalty (no refund of buying cost was planned).

== Sponsors ==
The measure was placed on the ballot with supporting signatures from Supervisors Tom Ammiano, Chris Daly, Bevan Dufty and Matt Gonzalez.

San Francisco District Attorney Kamala Harris also sponsored the proposal.

Supervisor Michela Alioto-Pier initially supported the ordinance but formally withdrew her sponsorship on February 23, 2005.

== Groups in opposition ==
- San Francisco Chronicle
- San Francisco Examiner
- Asian Week
- Frontlines
- The Argonaut
- San Francisco Deputy Sheriff's Association
- San Francisco Police Officer's Association
- San Francisco Veteran Police Officers Association
- BART Police Officers SEIU Local 1008
- California Association of Highway Patrolmen
- Fraternal Order of Police (California State Lodge)
- Chinese American Democratic Club
- Coalition For SF Neighborhoods
- The Haight Ashbury Neighborhood Council
- Mexican American Political Association
- Outer Mission Residents Association
- Richmond District Democratic Club
- San Francisco Housing Rights Association
- San Francisco Pink Pistols
- The National Rifle Association

== Results at the polls ==
The City population of San Francisco is at least 805,235, without counting people not registered, or travelling/working in the metro area.

Proposition H
Choice	Votes	%
For	123,033	57.79
Against	89,856	42.21
Total	212,889	100.00
Valid votes	212,889	92.68
Invalid/blank votes	16,825	7.32
Total votes	229,714	100.00
Registered voters/turnout		53.61

== Demise in the courts ==
Proposition H would have taken effect January 1, 2006, but enforcement was suspended by litigation.

On June 13, 2006, in the case of Fiscal v. City and County of San Francisco (Case No. CPF-05-505960), San Francisco Superior Court Judge James Warren struck down the ban, saying local governments have no such authority under California law. Judge Warren sided with the National Rifle Association, Second Amendment Foundation, and other petitioners represented by Chuck Michel of Trutanich-Michel, LLP, in Long Beach, California, who sued on behalf of gun owners, advocates and dealers the day after the measure passed. Judge Warren wrote in his 30-page ruling that "Proposition H is adjudged invalid as preempted by state law."

The judge's decision was not without precedent considering a California appeals court nullified an almost identical San Francisco gun ban on exactly the same grounds in 1982.

The City appealed Judge Warren's ruling, but lost by a unanimous decision from the three judge panel in the Court of Appeals issued on January 9, 2008. On February 19, 2008, San Francisco asked the California Supreme Court to review Court of Appeal's decision. The state Supreme Court reached a unanimous decision on April 9, 2008, that rejected the city's appeal and upheld the lower courts' decision.

In October 2008, San Francisco was forced to pay a $380,000 settlement to the National Rifle Association and other plaintiffs to cover the costs of litigating Proposition H.

On June 28, 2010, the Supreme Court of the United States decided that the Second Amendment applied to the states in the case McDonald v. City of Chicago, striking down all handgun bans nationwide.

== See also ==
- Gun politics in the United States
- Firearm case law in the United States
- Right to keep and bear arms
- Coalition to Stop Gun Violence
- Brady Handgun Violence Prevention Act
- National Rifle Association
- Second Amendment Foundation
- Pink Pistols (Gay gun rights organization)
- Guy Montag Doe v. San Francisco Housing Authority (2008 NRA lawsuit against San Francisco challenging the city's ban of guns in public housing.)
- Disaster Recovery Personal Protection Act of 2006 (Law enacted in the aftermath of Hurricane Katrina prohibiting the confiscation of legal firearms in a state of emergency.)
- District of Columbia v. Heller (Landmark 2008 Supreme Court decision stating that the US Constitution protects an individual's right to possess a firearm for self-defense.)
- McDonald v. Chicago (Landmark 2010 Supreme Court decision stating that the Second Amendment was incorporated under the Fourteenth Amendment.)
