= FOID =

FOID or foid may refer to:

- Foid (incel term), a demeaning term for women in incel culture
- Firearm Owner's Identification, a FOID card in Illinois
- Feldspathoid, sometimes called a "foid", a class of mineral found in igneous rocks ("foid" can also refer to the rocks themselves)
