= Viramontes v. Cook County =

- Supreme Court of the United States
- Full case name: Cutberto Viramontes, et al. v. Cook County, Illinois, et al.
- Docket nos.: 25-238; 25-566

Case history
- Prior: Seventh Circuit affirmed (2025); Second Circuit affirmed denial of preliminary injunction (2025)

Questions presented
- Whether the Second and Fourteenth Amendments guarantee the right to possess AR-15 platform and similar semiautomatic rifles.

Laws applied
- U.S. Const. amend. II, XIV

Viramontes v. Cook County (Docket 25–238) (consolidated with Grant v. Higgins) is a pending United States Supreme Court case related to the Second Amendment to the United States Constitution. The question before the Court is whether the Second and Fourteenth Amendments guarantee the right to possess AR-15 platform and similar semiautomatic rifles. The case challenges bans on these rifles in Cook County, Illinois (Viramontes), and in Connecticut (Grant).

== Background ==
Various jurisdictions in the United States, including Cook County, Chicago, and Connecticut, ban private possession and sales of AR-15-pattern rifles. In District of Columbia v. Heller (2008), the Supreme Court held that the Second Amendment protects an individual right to possess a firearm unconnected with service in a militia, and to use that arm for traditionally lawful purposes, such as self-defense within the home. In McDonald v. City of Chicago (2010), the Court held that the Second Amendment right is fully applicable to the states. In New York State Rifle & Pistol Association, Inc. v. Bruen (2022), the Court held that when the Second Amendment's plain text covers an individual's conduct, the Constitution presumptively protects that conduct, and the government must demonstrate that the regulation is consistent with the nation's historical tradition of firearm regulation. Following Bruen, lower courts have reached conflicting rulings on whether bans on AR-15 and similar semiautomatic rifles are consistent with Second Amendment protection. The Second and Seventh Circuits upheld the bans. The Supreme Court granted review in June 2026.

The Seventh Circuit upheld Cook County's ban in a nonprecedential decision in June 2025. In August 2025 the Second Circuit affirmed the denial of a preliminary injunction against Connecticut's ban in National Association for Gun Rights v. Lamont and Grant v. Rovella. On July 9, 2026 the Seventh Circuit upheld Illinois's ban in Barnett v. Raoul. On July 17, 2026 the en banc Third Circuit ruled the other way and held that New Jersey's ban on semiautomatic rifles and its limit on large capacity magazines violate the Second Amendment in Association of New Jersey Rifle and Pistol Clubs v. Attorney General of New Jersey.

== Supreme Court ==
Certiorari was granted in the case on June 30, 2026. It was consolidated with Grant v. Higgins (No. 25-566) for one hour of oral argument and all filings proceeded under No. 25-238. Petitioners filed their merits brief on August 28, 2026 and oral argument is scheduled for December 2, 2026.

The Solicitor General, D. John Sauer, filed a brief for the United States as amicus curiae in support of petitioners on September 4, 2026. The brief argued that AR-15 rifles are constitutionally protected arms in common use. It also argued that the challenged bans are unconstitutional. Sauer later moved for divided argument and asked for ten minutes of argument time for the United States. As of September 2026 the motion was still pending.

The case attracted a significant number of additional amicus curiae briefs, with 44 filed in support of the petitioners, including by the National Rifle Association and the Cato Institute, and 43 filed in support of the respondents, including by Everytown for Gun Safety and the Brady Center. The US Conference of Catholic Bishops filed a brief in support of neither party, arguing for public authority to regulate dangerous weapons without taking a specific position on the case itself.

On October 29, 2026, the lead petitioner, Cutberto Viramontes, filed a motion asking to be dismissed from the case, and Cook County later asked the Supreme Court to drop the Cook County case if he is removed. The Connecticut case, Grant v. Higgins, would be unaffected.
