= Guy Montag Doe v. San Francisco Housing Authority =

2009 US Federal lawsuit

Guy Montag Doe v. San Francisco Housing Authority is a lawsuit filed by the National Rifle Association of America the day after the United States Supreme Court decided in District of Columbia v. Heller that the Second Amendment to the United States Constitution protects an individual's right to possess a firearm for private use. The complaint against San Francisco challenges the city's ban of guns in public housing.

San Francisco City Attorney Dennis Herrera claimed the NRA's lawsuit is "factually slipshod" because, among other reasons, the city is erroneously named as a defendant, in addition to the housing authority, which is a separate legal entity. The NRA responded that any errors in the complaint will be corrected and the purpose of the lawsuit is to confirm whether the Supreme Court's ruling applies to state and city gun laws as well as federal measures.

The name "Guy Montag" is a reference to the hero of Ray Bradbury's novel Fahrenheit 451.

== Settlement ==
On January 14, 2009, the San Francisco Housing Authority reached a settlement with the NRA, which allows residents to possess legal firearms within a SFHA apartment building.

== See also ==
- Firearm case law in the United States
- McDonald v. Chicago
- Proposition H
