= Firearms Control Regulations Act of 1975 =

The Firearms Control Regulations Act of 1975 was passed by the District of Columbia city council on June 29, 1976, and went into effect September 24, 1976. The law banned residents from owning handguns, automatic firearms, or high-capacity semi-automatic firearms, as well as prohibited possession of unregistered firearms. Exceptions to the ban were allowed for police officers and guns registered before 1976. The law also required firearms kept in the home to be "unloaded, disassembled, or bound by a trigger lock or similar device"; this was deemed to be a prohibition on the use of firearms for self-defense in the home. On June 26, 2008, in the historic case of District of Columbia v. Heller, the Supreme Court of the United States determined that the ban and trigger lock provisions violate the Second Amendment.

== Constitutionality ==
Washington, D.C.'s gun laws are considered by many to be the strictest in the United States, and have been challenged as infringing on constitutional rights protected by the United States Constitution's Second Amendment. On March 9, 2007, portions of the law were declared unconstitutional by a three-judge panel of the United States Court of Appeals for the District of Columbia Circuit, in a 2-1 ruling in the case District of Columbia v. Heller. After the District's application for a rehearing en banc was denied, it appealed the decision to the Supreme Court of the United States. On June 26, 2008, the Court determined that the ban and trigger lock provision violate the Second Amendment. However, the ruling does not prohibit all forms of gun control; laws requiring firearm registration remain in place as does the city's assault weapon restriction.

== See also ==
- Crime in Washington, D.C.
- District of Columbia home rule
- District of Columbia v. Heller
- Gun politics in the United States
- Warren v. District of Columbia
