= United States v. Miller =

- Supreme Court of the United States

Argued March 30, 1939 Decided May 15, 1939
- Full case name: United States vs. Jack Miller, et al.
- Citations: 307 U.S. 174 (more) 59 S. Ct. 816; 83 L. Ed. 1206; 39-1 U.S. Tax Cas. (CCH) ¶ 9513; 22 A.F.T.R. (P-H) 331; 1939-1 C.B. 373; 1939 P.H. P5421

Case history
- Prior: Appeal from the District Court of the United States for the Western District of Arkansas

Holding
- The National Firearms Act, as applied to transporting in interstate commerce a 12-gauge shotgun with a barrel less than 18 inches long, without having registered it and without having in his possession a stamp-affixed written order for it, was not unconstitutional as an invasion of the reserved powers of the states and did not violate the Second Amendment of the US Constitution.

Court membership
- Chief Justice Charles E. Hughes Associate Justices James C. McReynolds · Pierce Butler; Harlan F. Stone · Owen Roberts; Hugo Black · Stanley F. Reed; Felix Frankfurter · William O. Douglas

Case opinion
- Majority: McReynolds, joined by Hughes, Butler, Stone, Roberts, Black, Reed, Frankfurter
- Douglas took no part in the consideration or decision of the case.

Laws applied
- National Firearms Act of 1934 (NFA)

United States v. Miller, 307 U.S. 174 (1939), is a landmark decision of the Supreme Court of the United States that involved a Second Amendment to the United States Constitution challenge to the National Firearms Act of 1934 (NFA). The case is often cited in the ongoing American gun politics debate, as both sides claim that it supports their position.

== Background ==
The case involved a criminal prosecution under the 1934 National Firearms Act (NFA). Passed in response to public outcry over the St. Valentine's Day Massacre, the NFA requires certain types of firearms, such as fully automatic firearms and short-barrelled rifles and shotguns, to be registered with the Miscellaneous Tax Unit, which was later folded into what eventually became the Bureau of Alcohol, Tobacco, Firearms and Explosives (ATF), then part of the Bureau of Internal Revenue, the ancestor of today's Internal Revenue Service. The $200 tax was to be paid at the time of registration and again if the firearm was ever sold.

The defendants Jack Miller and Frank Layton were indicted on charges of unlawfully and feloniously transporting in interstate commerce from Oklahoma to Arkansas an unregistered double-barrel 12-gauge shotgun having a barrel less than 18 inches in length, in violation of the National Firearms Act, 26 U.S.C.S. § 1132c et seq. ("Act"). At trial in federal district court, the defendants filed a demurrer to the indictment alleging that the Act was not a revenue measure but an attempt to usurp police power reserved to the states and so was unconstitutional. Defendants further argued that the Act violated the Second Amendment to the United States Constitution. The district court held that the section of the Act that made it unlawful to transport an unregistered firearm in interstate commerce was unconstitutional as violative of the Second Amendment. It accordingly sustained the demurrer and quashed the indictment. The government took a direct appeal to the Supreme Court.

In reality, modern scholars allege that Miller was a collusive test case. The district court judge, Heartsill Ragon, was in favor of the gun control law and ruled the law unconstitutional because he knew that Miller, a known bank robber who had just testified against the rest of his gang in court, would have to go into hiding as soon as he was released. He knew that Miller would not pay a lawyer to argue the case at the Supreme Court and would simply disappear. Therefore, the government's appeal to the Supreme Court would surely be a victory because Miller and his attorney would not even be present at the argument.

On March 30, 1939, the Supreme Court heard the case. Attorneys for the United States argued four points:

1. The NFA is intended as a revenue-collecting measure and so is within the authority of the Department of the Treasury.
2. The defendants transported the shotgun from Oklahoma to Arkansas and so used it in interstate commerce.
3. The Second Amendment protects only the ownership of military-type weapons appropriate for use in an organized militia.
4. The "double barrel 12-gauge Stevens shotgun having a barrel less than 18 inches in length, bearing identification number 76230," was never used in any militia organization.

Neither the defendants nor their legal counsel appeared at the Supreme Court. A lack of financial support and procedural irregularities prevented counsel from traveling. Miller was found shot to death in April, before the decision had been rendered.

== Decision ==
On May 15, 1939, the Supreme Court, in an opinion by Justice McReynolds, decided on the National Firearms Act, as applied to one indicted for transporting in interstate commerce a 12-gauge shotgun with a barrel less than 18 inches long without having registered it and without having in his possession a stamp-affixed written order for it, as required by the Act:

1. Not unconstitutional as an invasion of the reserved powers of the States. Citing Sonzinsky v. United States, 300 U. S. 506, and Narcotic Act cases. P. 307 U. S. 177. The conclusion was in the favor of the NFA.
2. Not violative of the Second Amendment of the Federal Constitution. P. 307 U. S. 178.

The Court cannot take judicial notice that a shotgun having a barrel less than 18 inches long has today any reasonable relation to the preservation or efficiency of a well regulated militia, and therefore cannot say that the Second Amendment guarantees to the citizen the right to keep and bear such a weapon.

In the absence of any evidence tending to show that possession or use of a "shotgun having a barrel of less than eighteen inches in length" at this time has some reasonable relationship to the preservation or efficiency of a well regulated militia, we cannot say that the Second Amendment guarantees the right to keep and bear such an instrument. Certainly it is not within judicial notice that this weapon is any part of the ordinary military equipment, or that its use could contribute to the common defense.

In addition, Justice McReynolds wrote:

With obvious purpose to assure the continuation and render possible the effectiveness of such forces the declaration and guarantee of the Second Amendment were made. It must be interpreted and applied with that end in view.

== Interpretations ==
Gun control advocates argue that the United States Circuit Courts, with very few exceptions, have for over six decades cited Miller in rejecting challenges to federal firearms regulations.

Gun rights advocates claim the case as a victory because they interpret it as stating that ownership of weapons for efficiency or the preservation of a well-regulated militia unit is specifically protected. Furthermore, they frequently point out that short-barreled shotguns (with 20-inch barrels) have been commonly used in warfare and that the statement made by the judges indicates that they were not made aware of this fact. Because the defense did not appear, there was arguably no way for judges to know otherwise. Two of the justices involved in the decision had prior military experience, Justice Black as a captain in the field artillery during World War I and Justice Frankfurter as a major in the Army legal service; however, there is no way to know if they were personally aware of the use of shotguns by American troops. During World War I, between 30,000 and 40,000 short-barreled pump-action shotguns were purchased by the US Ordnance Department for the purpose of guarding German prisoners, a 1919 report states that they “were undoubtedly in some instances carried into the actual fighting.”

Some argue that fundamental issues related to the case were never truly decided because the Supreme Court remanded the case to the federal district court for "further proceedings", which never took place. By the time of the Supreme Court decision, Miller had been killed, and since Layton made a plea bargain after the decision was handed down, there were no claimants left to continue legal proceedings.

The US Supreme Court has mentioned Miller in only seven subsequent cases: Konigsberg (1961); Atlanta Motel (1964); Adams (1972); Lewis (1980); Printz (1997); Heller (2008) and McDonald v. City of Chicago (2010); Justice James Clark McReynolds authored the decision in United States v. Miller, the only Supreme Court case that directly involved the Second Amendment until District of Columbia v. Heller in 2008.

Here are the Supreme Court's interpretations of the 1939 Miller opinion:

Konigsberg v. State Bar (1961); Footnote 10
That view, which of course cannot be reconciled with the law relating to libel, slander, misrepresentation, obscenity, perjury, false advertising, solicitation of crime, complicity by encouragement, conspiracy, and the like, is said to be compelled by the fact that the commands of the First Amendment are stated in unqualified terms: "Congress shall make no law ... abridging the freedom of speech, or of the press; or the right of the people peaceably to assemble". But as Mr. Justice Holmes once said: "[T]he provisions of the Constitution are not mathematical formulas having their essence in their form; they are organic living institutions transplanted from English soil. Their significance is vital not formal; it is to be gathered not simply by taking the words and a dictionary, but by considering their origin and the line of their growth." Gompers v. United States, 233 U.S. 604, 610. However, compare the qualified language of the Second Amendment: "A well regulated militia, being necessary to the security of a free state, the right of the people to keep and bear arms shall not be infringed." And see United States v. Miller, 307 U.S. 174.
Heart of Atlanta Motel v. United States (1964); (concurring opinion of Black; Footnote 11)
"... cases in which the commerce power has been used to advance other ends not entirely commercial: e. g., ... United States v. Miller, 307 U.S. 174 (National Firearms Act);
Adams v. Williams (1972); (dissenting opinion of Douglas, joined by Marshall)
The leading case is United States v. Miller, 307 U.S. 174, upholding a federal law making criminal the shipment in interstate commerce of a sawed-off shotgun. The law was upheld, there being no evidence that a sawed-off shotgun had "some reasonable relationship to the preservation or efficiency of a well regulated militia". Id., at 178. The Second Amendment, it was held, "must be interpreted and applied" with the view of maintaining a "militia".

The Militia which the States were expected to maintain and train is set in contrast with Troops which they were forbidden to keep without the consent of Congress. The sentiment of the time strongly disfavored standing armies; the common view was that adequate defense of country and laws could be secured through the Militia - civilians primarily, soldiers on occasion.

— Id., at 178-179.

Critics say that proposals like this water down the Second Amendment. Our decisions belie that argument, for the Second Amendment, as noted, was designed to keep alive the militia.
Lewis v. United States (1980); Footnote 8
(the Second Amendment guarantees no right to keep and bear a firearm that does not have "some reasonable relationship to the preservation or efficiency of a well regulated militia"); United States v. Three Winchester 30-30 Caliber Lever Action Carbines, 504 F.2d 1288, 1290, n. 5 (CA7 1974); United States v. Johnson, 497 F.2d 548 (CA4 1974); Cody v. United States, 460 F.2d 34 (CA8), cert. denied, 409 U.S. 1010 (1972) (the latter three cases holding, respectively, that 1202 (a) (1), 922 (g), and 922 (a) (6) do not violate the Second Amendment).
Printz v. United States (1997) (concurring opinion of Thomas)
Our most recent treatment of the Second Amendment occurred in United States v. Miller, 307 U.S. 174 (1939), in which we reversed the District Court's invalidation of the National Firearms Act, enacted in 1934. In Miller, we determined that the Second Amendment did not guarantee a citizen's right to possess a sawed off shotgun because that weapon had not been shown to be "ordinary military equipment" that could "contribute to the common defense". Id., at 178. The Court did not, however, attempt to define, or otherwise construe, the substantive right protected by the Second Amendment.
District of Columbia v. Heller (2008)

== See also ==
- Firearm case law in the United States
- List of United States Supreme Court cases, volume 307
