= Moore v. Madigan =

Pair of court cases

- Court: United States Court of Appeals for the Seventh Circuit
- Full case name: Michael Moore, et al., and Mary E. Shepard, et al., Plaintiffs-Appellants, v. Lisa Madigan, Attorney General of Illinois, et al., Defendants-Appellees.
- Decided: December 11, 2012

Case history
- Appealed from: United States District Courts for the Central District of Illinois and the Southern District of Illinois
- Subsequent actions: District court reversed and remanded with directions, but stayed for 180 days

Court membership
- Judges sitting: Posner, Flaum, Williams

Case opinions
- Decision by: Posner, Flaum
- Dissent: Williams

Moore v. Madigan (USDC 11-CV-405-WDS, 11-CV-03134; 7th Cir. 12–1269, 12–1788) is the common name for a pair of cases decided in 2013 by the U.S. Court of Appeals, 7th Circuit, regarding the constitutionality of the State of Illinois' no-issue legislation and policy regarding the carry of concealed weapons. The plaintiffs, Michael Moore (not the famous filmmaker), Mary Shepard and the Second Amendment Foundation, sought an injunction against Illinois attorney general Lisa Madigan, Illinois Governor Patrick Quinn, and other named defendants, barring them from enforcing two key provisions of the Illinois Statutes prohibiting public possession of a firearm or other weapon.

The case was initially dismissed by the Illinois Federal District Court, but a 3-judge panel of the 7th Circuit reversed, and an en banc rehearing was declined by the full Circuit. Madigan and other named Defendants were considering an appeal to the United States Supreme Court prior to July 2013, but the legal case became mooted once the Illinois legislature passed a shall issue concealed carry law that month.

== Background ==
Illinois State Statutes §720 ILCS 5/24-1 and §720 ILCS 5/24-1.6 define the crimes of "Unlawful Use of Weapons" and "Aggravated Unlawful Use of Weapons". In part, they state that a person commits a gross misdemeanor when he knowingly "Carries or possesses in any vehicle or concealed on or about his person except when on his land or in his own abode, legal dwelling, or fixed place of business, or on the land or in the legal dwelling of another person as an invitee with that person's permission, any pistol, revolver, stun gun or taser or other firearm . . . or . . . Carries or possesses on or about his person, upon any public street, alley, or other public lands within the corporate limits of a city, village or incorporated town, except when an invitee thereon or therein, for the purpose of the display of such weapon or the lawful commerce in weapons, or except when on his land or in his own abode, legal dwelling, or fixed place of business, or on the land or in the legal dwelling of another person as an invitee with that person's permission, any pistol, revolver, stun gun or taser or other firearm...". The offense is a Class 4 felony for a first offense and a Class 2 felony thereafter under the "Aggravated" variation if, at any time, the weapon possessed by the person was uncased and either loaded or with the ammunition "immediately accessible". Coupled with lack of exemption based on a carry permit, the like of which did not exist in Illinois, the Statutes effectively prohibit all forms of defensive weapons carry by private citizens.

=== Shepard v. Madigan, 11-CV-405-WDS ===
In 2009, Mary E. Shepard, a member of the advocacy group the Illinois State Rifle Association, was performing volunteer duties as treasurer at her church, when she was assaulted and beaten by an intruder and left for dead. Her injuries were numerous and major, including skull fractures, hearing loss, shattered teeth, and vertebral damage, which required many surgeries and extensive physical therapy. An 83-year-old coworker, unnamed in the suit, was also brutalized and badly injured in the attack. Despite possessing a handgun and maintaining the State-required Firearms Owner Identification card (FOID), Shepard was unarmed as required by Illinois statutes during the attack, and asserts that if she had had access to her weapon, she could have fought off her assailant and avoided the injuries to herself and her co-worker. Shepard and the Second Amendment Foundation filed suit in 2011 in the U.S. District Court for the Southern District of Illinois, seeking an injunction barring Lisa Madigan, in her capacity as Attorney General for the State of Illinois, from enforcing the sections of the Illinois State Statutes that prohibit public carry of a loaded, functional firearm.

=== Moore v. Madigan, 11-CV-03134 ===
On May 12, 2011, plaintiffs Michael Moore, Charles Hooks, IllinoisCarry, and the Second Amendment Foundation filed suit in the United States District Court for the Central District of Illinois, Springfield Division, alleging that the same areas of the Illinois State Statutes mentioned in Shepard were facially violative of the U.S. Constitution, specifically the Second Amendment as interpreted by the landmark Supreme Court Cases D.C. v. Heller and McDonald v. Chicago, and sought an injunction barring enforcement of the statutes.

Moore, a Cook County Sheriff's Deputy who retired after 30 years of service, had attempted to obtain the ability to carry a concealed firearm as a retired law enforcement officer under HR 218, the Law Enforcement Officers Safety Act, but Cook County Sheriff Tom Dart declined to issue him one, stating that Deputy Moore had been employed as a corrections deputy, not a "road" deputy and did not meet the standard. In 2010, Moore and four other retired officers filed a suit in Federal Court against the Illinois Law Enforcement Training and Standards Board (the agency that administers LEOSA in Illinois) challenging the ID card requirement of LEOSA. The Court ruled that the plaintiffs had no standing, specifically "absent clear statutory intent, a court is precluded from creating a private right of action..." and that "LEOSA does not provide for a mechanism enabling Plaintiffs to sue".

== District Court ==
In an opinion dated March 30, 2012, Judge William D. Stiehl, presiding for the U.S. District Court of the Southern District of Illinois, dismissed the complaint in Shepard v. Madigan. Among his findings were that the Heller, McDonald and subsequent relevant 7th Circuit decisions failed to address the specific assertion of the Plaintiffs, specifically that the right to keep and bear arms outside one's own home is a "core" protection of the Second Amendment (one whose restriction would be subject to strict scrutiny upon review). Absent such decision, and with text from Heller stating that the historical review in that case did not support the claim that "the Second Amendment necessarily extends the right to keep and bear arms to the unfettered right to carry weapons in public", Judge Stiehl asserted that in fact this right is not a "core" protected right of the Second Amendment, and therefore the purpose of the Illinois Statutes, to reduce gun-related crime by restricting the carry of weapons in public to law enforcement officers only, is "reasonably adapted to a substantial government interest" as required by intermediate scrutiny, and is thus constitutional.

Similarly, in Moore v. Madigan, the court, with Judge Sue E. Myerscough presiding, found on February 3, 2012, that Supreme Court and 7th Circuit decisions did not recognize the right to keep and bear arms as extending outside one's own home. Therefore, the court found, the Plaintiffs would be unlikely to prevail with their lawsuit, and so the preliminary injunction motion was denied. Along similar reasoning, the court found that the activities restricted by the Illinois Statutes did not restrict activity expressly protected by the Second Amendment, as the right was understood as of the ratification of the Bill of Rights, and so the defendants' motion to dismiss was granted.

== Seventh Circuit ==
The plaintiffs in both cases appealed to the Seventh Circuit Court of Appeals, as cases 12-1269 and 12–1788. As the subject matter of the two cases was nearly identical and there was also a high degree of overlap in the field of Plaintiffs and Defendants, the court effectively merged the two cases for purposes of argument and decision as Moore v. Madigan (taking the common name from the first case to be appealed). Arguments were heard on June 8, 2012, before the panel of Circuit Judges Posner, Flaum and Williams, and the decision was published December 11, 2012.

In a 2-1 decision (Williams dissenting), the court reversed both District Courts' decisions and orders. Judge Posner, writing for the majority, notes that while the Heller and McDonald decisions did say that the need for self-defense is most acute inside the home, that doesn't mean it is not also acute outside the home. "Confrontations are not limited to the home". The distinct use of the words "keep" and "bear" in the text of the Second Amendment, the court reasoned, implied the right to carry outside one's home, as in historical context, the meaning of the word did not limit it to the home and it would be awkward to attempt to assign that connotation to documents of the time period. The court also reasoned that this limitation would not have been rational as of the ratification of the Bill of Rights, because in what was then the Wild West - including the Ohio River Valley - settlers would have had to contend with native Indians, and such confrontations would be more likely, and more dangerous to an unarmed settler, outside the home rather than in. This negated the Defendants/Appellees' claim that the Blackstone writings and other documents of English origin pointed to a more castle doctrine-based interpretation of the Second Amendment as it would have been understood by the American colonists. While twenty-first century Illinois has no marauding Indian tribes, the threat, from gangs and street thugs, continues, and, says the decision, "a Chicagoan is a good deal more likely to be attacked on a sidewalk in a rough neighborhood than in his apartment on the 35th floor of the Park Tower."

The decision also rejected the argument that the Illinois laws had an effect on gun crime, noting that Chicago's criminal element was undeterred by the ban on handguns overturned by McDonald. Citing the study, "Firearms Laws and the Reduction of Violence: A Systematic Review", and several other published studies, the court found that evidence did not support a link between gun regulations and crime rates in either direction. The court, again from the Heller decision, stated "Anyway the Supreme Court made clear in Heller that it wasn't going to make the right to bear arms depend on casualty counts. (554 U.S. at 636). If the mere possibility that allowing guns to be carried in public would increase the crime or death rates sufficed to justify a ban, Heller would have been decided the other way, for that possibility was as great in the District of Columbia as it is in Illinois."

As such, the court held that although the State of Illinois would logically have a substantial interest in reducing gun-related crime and injury/death, the carry ban is not reasonably adapted to this goal and therefore fails even intermediate scrutiny.

The Circuit Court ordered the cases remanded to their respective District Courts, with orders that those courts find the laws unconstitutional and institute permanent injunctions. However, as they realized this would leave the State virtually without any gun laws at all (the overwhelming majority of its policy on the subject hinging on these two overturned sections of law), the Court of Appeals stayed these mandates for 180 days, allowing the Illinois Legislature sufficient time to attempt to craft a law that met constitutional review, implying that such laws would have to allow the public carry of firearms in some form. That 180-day stay expires on June 8, 2013; should the Legislature not act by that time, the injunction would take effect and the State of Illinois would technically become an "unrestricted" state with regard to concealed carry.

On March 13, 2013, the 7th Circuit denied the Defendants' petition for en banc rehearing before the full 10-judge Court, tacitly affirming the panel decision. Four of the ten judges dissented in that decision.

On April 29, 2013, Illinois Attorney General Lisa Madigan asked the Supreme Court of the United States for an extension to file a writ of certiorari.

== Legacy ==
After the initial panel decision, the Chicago aldermen and mayor Rahm Emanuel vowed to continue the fight, both by supporting appeals to the Supreme Court and to craft a city ordinance reaffirming the ban on public carry, even in opposition to any State statutes. Currently, there is no appeal to the U.S. Supreme Court, although spokesmen for the Illinois Attorney General's office said that AG Lisa Madigan was considering one immediately following the panel decision. A later news story by the San Francisco Chronicle indicated that Madigan was declining to appeal to SCOTUS following the Circuit Court's en banc denial; however, Governor Quinn, a named defendant in the suit (and thus with standing to appeal), is still supporting an appeal to SCOTUS.

After the full court denied en banc hearing, the Chicago Tribune reported that Illinois law enforcement, prosecutors and judges are continuing to arrest, charge and convict persons accused of illegally carrying concealed firearms in certain parts of the state, while law enforcement and prosecutors in a number of rural counties had stopped prosecuting individuals for simply carrying firearms without a demonstration of some other malicious intent. A Cook County court ruled, based on a 1971 State Supreme Court decision, that in the absence of a ruling by the U.S. Supreme Court, the Court of Appeals decision does not apply to Illinois. Legal experts reject this, stating that while the decision does not apply to the actual courts, the law enforcement officials and prosecuting attorneys can face federal contempt-of-court charges for these actions. Other decisions currently pending hearing or appeal assert that, due to the stay, the state laws remain in effect and thus prosecutable until June 9.

On June 3, 2013, the Illinois Legislature passed a "shall-issue" concealed-carry bill, which would allow handgun owners with a valid FOID who paid a $150 fee and attended 16 hours of training to obtain a concealed-carry license. In a compromise between representatives of the Chicago area and other large cities, and those from smaller cities and rural areas, the bill preempts any local ordinances governing possession and use of handguns, allows storage of a handgun by a person with a carry permit in an automobile, even if that vehicle is parked in an otherwise prohibited place, and allows concealed carry into food service establishments that make less than 50% of their revenue from sales of alcohol "by the drink" (a common delineation point in the laws of many States between "restaurants" and "bars"). However, in concession to the interests of the Chicago area, mass transit buses and trains, schools, other government buildings, parks, hospitals and street festivals are designated "gun-free". The bill passed both the State House and Senate by large margins (89-28 and 45-12 respectively, well over the 2/3 margin required to override a veto), but as of June 11, still awaited action by Governor Patrick Quinn, named in Moore and who supports an appeal to SCOTUS.

On June 4, the 7th Circuit issued one 30-day extension of the original stay, allowing Governor Quinn and his staff time to review the law passed by the Legislature and decide on a course of action. The 7th Circuit's ruling invalidating former Illinois law did not take effect until July 9, 2013. The court indicated it would not extend the stay again, so were the law not passed, in order for the State to maintain the ban, SCOTUS would have had to stay the Circuit Court's ruling.

On July 9, 2013, the Illinois General Assembly voted to override Governor Quinn's veto of the bill passed in early June, now giving Illinois a legal framework for issuing concealed carry permits. Illinois was the last U.S. state to allow concealed carry of guns.

Following the Federal Court ruling, a spokesperson for Illinois Attorney General Lisa Madigan's office stated that an appeal to the Supreme Court was now "moot" as the state has complied with the 7th Circuit court's ruling.
