= People v. Aguilar =

Illinois Supreme Court case

- Seal of the Supreme Court of Illinois
- Court: Supreme Court of Illinois
- Full case name: People of the State of Illinois v. Alberto Aguilar
- Decided: September 12, 2013
- Citation: 2013 IL 112116; 2 N.E.3d 321; 2013 Ill. LEXIS 853; 2013 WL 5080118 (Ill. 2013)

Case history
- Prior actions: People v. Aguilar, 408 Ill. App. 3d 136, 944 N.E.2d 814, 2011 Ill. App. LEXIS 103 (Ill. App. Ct. 2011)

Court membership
- Judges sitting: CJ. Thomas L. Kilbride; JJ. Charles E. Freeman, Robert R. Thomas, Rita B. Garman, Lloyd A. Karmeier, Anne M. Burke, Mary Jane Theis

Case opinions
- Reversed in part and affirmed in part. On its face, Aggravated Unlawful Use of a Weapon, 720 ILCS 5/24-1.6(a)(1), (a)(3)(A) (2008), violated the right to keep and bear arms, as guaranteed by the Second Amendment, because it amounted to a wholesale statutory ban on the exercise of a personal right that was specifically named in and guaranteed by the United States Constitution, as construed by the United States Supreme Court; Defendant's conviction for Unlawful Possession of a Firearm, 720 ILCS 5/24-3.1(a)(1) (2008), was proper because the possession of handguns by minors was conduct that fell outside the scope of the Second Amendment's protection.
- Decision by: J. Thomas

People v. Aguilar, 2 N.E.3d 321 (Ill. 2013), was an Illinois Supreme Court case in which the Court held that the Aggravated Unlawful Use of a Weapon (AUUF) statute violated the right to keep and bear arms as guaranteed by the Second Amendment. The Court stated that this was because the statute amounted to a wholesale statutory ban on the exercise of a personal right that was specifically named in and guaranteed by the United States Constitution, as construed by the United States Supreme Court. A conviction for Unlawful Possession of a Firearm (UPF) was proper because the possession of handguns by minors was conduct that fell outside the scope of the Second Amendment's protection.

In 2008, Alberto Aguilar, then 17, was arrested and charged with AUUF and UPF. After being convicted and sentenced to probation by the trial court, he appealed, arguing that both statutes were unconstitutional infringements of his Second Amendment rights. The Illinois Court of Appeals affirmed his conviction, and he appealed that ruling to the Illinois Supreme Court. While Aguilar's appeal was pending, the Federal Seventh Circuit Court of Appeals had ruled that the AUUF statute was unconstitutional.

When the matter was decided by the Illinois Supreme Court, they agreed with the Seventh Circuit and declared the AUUF law unconstitutional, but upheld the constitutionality of the UPF law.

== Background ==
=== Legal background ===
Illinois was the last state in the nation to allow concealed carry of a handgun. Prior to 2013, Illinois prohibited the carry of a firearm in a loaded condition, other than at one's own property. (Note: A person could also have a firearm at another person's property, if the other person invited him to do so.) If the firearm was loaded and not in a locked case, or if it was otherwise available for immediate use, it was a felony offense called Aggravated Unlawful Use of a Weapon (AUUF). Illinois courts had uniformly upheld the constitutionally of the statute prior to 2008. The state also had a law called Unlawful Possession of a Firearm (UPF), which prohibited anyone under the age of 18 from possessing a firearm. Additionally, the City of Chicago had enacted strict gun control laws prohibiting the possession of any handgun that had not been registered prior to 1982, when the law took effect.

On June 26, 2008, exactly two weeks after Aguilar's arrest, the U.S. Supreme Court decided District of Columbia v. Heller. In Heller, the Court ruled that a law of the District of Columbia which had the effect of banning handguns in the city violated the Second Amendment and was unconstitutional. The Court said that the fundamental right protected by the Second Amendment was the right to self-defense; however since the District of Columbia was a federal jurisdiction, it was not clear that this applied to the individual states.

=== Factual background ===
On June 12, 2008, Chicago Police Officer Thomas Harris was in a surveillance position in the Little Village neighborhood of Chicago and observed a group of male teenagers creating a disturbance and throwing bottles at cars. Harris observed one of the teenagers, later identified as Alberto Aguilar, holding the right side of his waist, and Harris notified other officers. The other officers made contact with the teens and Officer John Dolan saw Aguilar drop a gun onto the ground. Aguilar, then 17, was arrested. The officers noted that the handgun had three rounds loaded in it and that the serial number was filed off. (Note: This would have been a federal felony offense, but he was not charged.)

=== Lower courts ===
==== Circuit Court ====
Aguilar was tried for AUUF and UPF at the Circuit Court for Cook County. The officers testified that Aguilar had the gun and had dropped it, while Aguilar claimed that he never had a gun, but was waiting for his mother to pick him up when officers came running into the back yard and tackled him. Aguilar's testimony was corroborated by Romero Diaz, who stated that Aguilar did not have a gun. Judge Charles P. Burns determined that the officers were more credible and found Aguilar guilty on both counts, sentencing him to 24 months probation on the AUUF charge; he did not pass sentence on the UPF charge.

==== Illinois Court of Appeals ====
Aguilar then appealed his conviction, arguing that the AUUF statute violated the Second Amendment and was unconstitutional. The Court of Appeals, evaluating Heller, found that Heller only protected the right to possess a handgun in the home. The court also evaluated McDonald and found that while it applied the Second Amendment to the states, it also only applied to handguns possessed in the home. The court, using an intermediate scrutiny test, determined that the Illinois statute was substantially related to an important governmental objective to protect the public from gun violence. The court affirmed the conviction.

=== Other relevant events ===
==== McDonald v. City of Chicago ====
In 2008, shortly after the Heller decision, three lawsuits (Note: The lawsuits were filed by Otis McDonald (supported by the Second Amendment Foundation) against Chicago, by the National Rifle Association (NRA) against Chicago, and by the NRA against Oak Park.) were filed in Illinois, challenging the constitutionally of handgun bans in Chicago and Oak Park. All three cases were consolidated and heard in the United States District Court for the Northern District of Illinois, and were dismissed based on earlier U.S. Supreme Court rulings (Note: The earlier rulings were United States v. Cruikshank, Presser v. Illinois, and Miller v. Texas.) that the Second Amendment did not apply to the states. The cases were appealed to the Seventh Circuit, which affirmed based on the same reasoning. The U.S. Supreme Court reversed that decision, holding that the Second Amendment was applicable to the states through the Fourteenth Amendment, and clarified that "self-defense was 'the central component of the right itself.'"

==== Moore v. Madigan ====
In 2011, two federal lawsuits were filed in the Southern District of Illinois and the Central District of Illinois. In both cases, the plaintiffs claimed that AUUF statute violated the Second Amendment in that it did not allow any method for a citizen to bear arms outside the home. Mary Shepard argued that the statutes were facially unconstitutional, while Michael Moore (Note: Not the Michael Moore of Bowling for Columbine fame.) argued that the statutes were unconstitutional as applied. (Note: A law is unconstitutional on its face if the law interferes with a protected right and that it would be invalid under all circumstances. A law is unconstitutional as applied if it could be constitutionally permissible but is enforced in a way that deprives a party of a protected right. A law that prohibits all public religious speech would be facially unconstitutional, while a permit system for speaking in a particular area, when one group is never granted a permit, would be unconstitutional as applied.) In both cases, the judges granted the state's motion to dismiss for failure to state a claim, holding that the Second Amendment only protected the right to possess arms in the home. Both Moore and Shepard appealed their cases to the Seventh Circuit, where the cases were consolidated.

The Seventh Circuit found that Illinois law did violate the Constitution in that there was no method for a person to carry a weapon for self-defense outside of the home. The court stated that the district courts had read Heller and McDonald too narrowly—that the right protected was self-defense, and there was as great if not greater need outside the home. The court rejected the state's argument that strict gun regulation lowered crime, noting that the evidence did not support that. The decisions of the district courts were reversed and the cases remanded to those courts with instructions to declare the Illinois law unconstitutional, issuing a permanent injunction against the law's enforcement. The court then stayed the order for 180 days to give the Illinois legislature an opportunity to amend the law to make it constitutional.

==== Legislative actions ====
In January 2013 the Illinois Legislature began to look at enacting legislation to address the Moore decision. Lt. Governor Sheila Simon formed a working group of thirteen Democrats and two Republicans to look into the issue. During hearings on the matter, debate centered on concealed carry permits, with gun rights groups preferring shall-issue permits while gun control groups favored may-issue permits. On May 31, 2013, the state house passed a shall-issue bill by a vote of 89–28, after state senate passed it by a vote of 45–12. Both had veto-proof margins. On July 9, 2013, the Illinois legislature overrode Governor Pat Quinn's veto, and concealed carry was authorized for the state once the Illinois State Police issued permits.

== Supreme Court of Illinois ==
=== Arguments ===
On appeal, Aguilar again argued that the AUUF statute was unconstitutional on its face. Aguilar also made the argument that the UPF statute was unconstitutional, since at the time the Second Amendment was adopted, 16- and 17-year-olds could lawfully bear arms.

The state argued that Aguilar lacked standing to contest the constitutionality of the statute. The state claimed that since Aguilar denied having committing the act that the statute prohibited, he could not contest the constitutionality of it.

=== Opinion of the court ===
Justice Robert R. Thomas delivered the opinion of a unanimous court. Thomas first disposed of the standing argument by the state, noting that Aguilar was not challenging the statute as applied, but was arguing that the statute was facially unconstitutional since it did not provide for any person to legally bear arms. Since anyone could challenge the constitutionality of a statute when they were charged with violating it, even without admitting the underlying conduct, the state's argument was without merit.

Thomas then evaluated the constitutionality of the AUUF statute, noting that the Heller court had "concluded that the second amendment 'guarantee[s] the individual right to possess and carry weapons in case of confrontation . . . .'" He noted that McDonald reiterated that self-defense was at the core of the right. He analyzed what other courts in Illinois had done, noting that they had all focused on the ruling in Heller that the right existed in the home, and that they had held the AUUF statute constitutional since it affected conduct outside of the home. Thomas then compared this to the ruling by the Seventh Circuit in Moore and concluded that their ruling was correct, that the AUUF statute did in fact infringe on the rights guaranteed by the Second Amendment. Since the statute was unconstitutional, Aguilar's conviction must be reversed.

Thomas rejected the argument on the unconstitutionality of the UPF statute, noting that all courts that had addressed this issue had found that persons under 21 could be barred from possessing firearms. The conviction for UPF was affirmed, and the case was remanded.

== Subsequent developments ==
Following the decision, Cook County prosecutors stated that they would drop charges against some of the pending cases for AUUF, but that only those with valid Illinois Firearms Owner Identification cards would have the charges dropped. By September 16, 2013, the first case had been dismissed in Cook County. A number of law enforcement agences, such as the Springfield Police and the Sangamon Sheriff's Office, made a plea to the public to not immediately begin to carry concealed handguns. Some prosecutors have already announced that they do not intend to prosecute these cases.
