= District of Columbia v. Heller =

- Supreme Court of the United States

Argued March 18, 2008 Decided June 26, 2008
- Full case name: District of Columbia, et al. v. Dick Anthony Heller
- Docket no.: 07-290
- Citations: 554 U.S. 570 (more) 128 S. Ct. 2783; 171 L. Ed. 2d 637; 2008 U.S. LEXIS 5268; 76 U.S.L.W. 4631; 21 Fla. L. Weekly Fed. S 497
- Argument: Oral argument
- Opinion announcement: Opinion announcement
- Decision: Opinion

Case history
- Prior: Parker v. D.C., 311 F. Supp. 2d 103 (D.D.C. 2004), reversed, 478 F.3d 370 (D.C. Cir. 2007); cert. granted, 552 U.S. 1035 (2007).
- Procedural: Writ of Certiorari to the U.S. Court of Appeals for the District of Columbia Circuit

Holding
- The Second Amendment protects an individual right to possess a firearm unconnected with service in a militia, and to use that arm for traditionally lawful purposes, such as self-defense within the home.

Court membership
- Chief Justice John Roberts Associate Justices John P. Stevens · Antonin Scalia; Anthony Kennedy · David Souter; Clarence Thomas · Ruth Bader Ginsburg; Stephen Breyer · Samuel Alito

Case opinions
- Majority: Scalia, joined by Roberts, Kennedy, Thomas, Alito
- Dissent: Stevens, joined by Souter, Ginsburg, Breyer
- Dissent: Breyer, joined by Stevens, Souter, Ginsburg

Laws applied
- U.S. Const. amend. II; D.C. Code §§ 7-2502.02(a)(4), 22–4504, 7–2507.02

District of Columbia v. Heller, 554 U.S. 570 (2008), is a landmark decision of the Supreme Court of the United States. It ruled that the Second Amendment to the U.S. Constitution protects an individual's right to keep and bear arms—unconnected with service in a militia—for traditionally lawful purposes such as self-defense within the home, and that the District of Columbia's handgun ban and requirement that lawfully owned rifles and shotguns be kept "unloaded and disassembled or bound by a trigger lock" violated this guarantee. It also stated that the right to bear arms is not unlimited and that certain restrictions on guns and gun ownership were permissible. It was the first Supreme Court case to decide whether the Second Amendment protects an individual right to keep and bear arms for self-defense or whether the right was only intended for state militias.

Because of the District of Columbia's status as a federal enclave (it is not in any U.S. state), the decision did not address the question of whether the Second Amendment's protections are incorporated by the Due Process Clause of the Fourteenth Amendment to the U.S. Constitution against the states. This point was addressed two years later by McDonald v. City of Chicago (2010), in which it was found that they are.

On June 26, 2008, the Supreme Court affirmed by a vote of 5 to 4 the U.S. Court of Appeals for the D.C. Circuit in Heller v. District of Columbia. The Supreme Court struck down provisions of the Firearms Control Regulations Act of 1975 as unconstitutional, determined that handguns are "arms" for the purposes of the Second Amendment, found that the Regulations Act was an unconstitutional ban, and struck down the portion of the Act that requires all firearms including rifles and shotguns be kept "unloaded and disassembled or bound by a trigger lock". Prior to this decision, the law at issue also restricted residents from owning handguns except for those registered prior to 1975.

== Lower court background ==
In 2002, Robert A. Levy, a senior fellow at the Cato Institute, began vetting plaintiffs with Clark M. Neily III for a planned Second Amendment lawsuit that he would personally finance. Although he himself had never owned a gun, as a constitutional scholar, he had an academic interest in the subject and wanted to model his campaign after the legal strategies of Thurgood Marshall, who had successfully led the challenges that overturned school segregation. They aimed for a group that would be diverse in terms of gender, race, economic background, and age and selected six plaintiffs from their mid-20s to early 60s: three men and three women; four white and two black:

Tracey Ambeau (now Tracey Hanson)
An employee of the U.S. Department of Agriculture. Originally from St. Gabriel, Louisiana, she lived in the Adams Morgan neighborhood of D.C. with her husband, Andrew Hanson, who was from Waterloo, Iowa. They lived in a high-crime neighborhood near Union Station in D.C. She grew up around guns and wanted one to defend her home.
Dick Anthony Heller
A licensed special police officer for the District of Columbia. For his job, Heller carried a gun in federal office buildings, but was not allowed to have one in his home. Heller had lived in southeast D.C. near the Kentucky Courts public housing complex since 1970 and had seen the neighborhood "transformed from a child-friendly welfare complex to a drug haven". Heller had also approached the National Rifle Association (NRA) about a lawsuit to overturn the D.C. gun ban, but the NRA declined.
George Lyon
A communications lawyer who had previously contacted the NRA about filing a lawsuit to challenge the gun laws in the District of Columbia. Lyon held D.C. licenses for a shotgun and a rifle, but wanted to have a handgun in his home.
Tom G. Palmer
A colleague of Robert A. Levy at the Cato Institute and the only plaintiff that Levy knew before the case began. Palmer, who is gay, defended himself with a 9mm handgun in 1982. While walking with a friend in San Jose, California, he was accosted by a gang of about 20 young men who used profane language regarding his sexual orientation and threatened his life. When he produced his gun, the men fled. Palmer believes that the handgun saved his life.
Shelly Parker
A software designer and former nurse who had been active in trying to rid her neighborhood of drugs. Parker was a single woman whose life had been threatened on numerous occasions by drug dealers who had sometimes tried to break into her house.
Gillian St. Lawrence
A mortgage broker who lived in the Georgetown section of D.C. and who owned several legally registered long guns that she used for recreation in nearby Chantilly, Virginia. It had taken St. Lawrence two years to complete the registration process. She wanted to be able to use these guns to defend herself in her home and to be able to register a handgun.

Previous federal case law pertaining to the question of an individual's right to bear arms included United States v. Emerson, 270 F.3d 203 (5th Cir. 2001), which supported the right and Silveira v. Lockyer, 312 F.3d 1052 (9th Cir. 2002), which opposed the right. The Supreme Court ruling in United States v. Miller, 307 U.S. 174 (1939) was interpreted to support both sides of the issue.

=== District Court ===
In February 2003, the six residents of the District of Columbia filed a lawsuit in the District Court for the District of Columbia, challenging the constitutionality of provisions of the Firearms Control Regulations Act of 1975, a local law (part of the District of Columbia Code) enacted pursuant to District of Columbia home rule. This law restricted residents from owning handguns, excluding those grandfathered in by registration prior to 1975 and those possessed by active and retired law enforcement officers. The law also required that all firearms including rifles and shotguns be kept "unloaded and disassembled or bound by a trigger lock." They filed for an injunction pursuant to 28 U.S.C. § 2201, 2202, and 42 U.S.C. § 1983. District Court Judge Emmet G. Sullivan dismissed the lawsuit on March 31, 2004.

=== Court of Appeals ===
On appeal, the U.S. Court of Appeals for the D.C. Circuit reversed the dismissal in a 2-1 decision. The Court of Appeals struck down provisions of the Firearms Control Regulations Act as unconstitutional. Judges Karen L. Henderson, Thomas B. Griffith and Laurence H. Silberman formed the Court of Appeals panel, with Senior Circuit Judge Silberman writing the court's opinion and Circuit Judge Henderson dissenting.

The court's opinion first addressed whether appellants have standing to sue for declaratory and injunctive relief in section II (slip opinion, at 5–12). The court concluded that of the six plaintiffs, only Heller – who applied for a handgun permit but was denied – had standing.

The court then held that the Second Amendment "protects an individual right to keep and bear arms", that the "right existed prior to the formation of the new government under the Constitution", also stating that the right was "premised on the private use of arms for activities such as hunting and self-defense, the latter being understood as resistance to either private lawlessness or the depredations of a tyrannical government (or a threat from abroad)." They also noted that though the right to bear arms also helped preserve the citizen militia, "the activities [the Amendment] protects are not limited to militia service, nor is an individual's enjoyment of the right contingent upon his or her continued or intermittent enrollment in the militia." The court determined that handguns are "Arms" and concluded that thus they may not be banned by the District of Columbia.

The court also struck down the portion of the law that requires all firearms including rifles and shotguns be kept "unloaded and disassembled or bound by a trigger lock." The District argued that there is an implicit self-defense exception to these provisions, but the D.C. Circuit rejected this view, saying that the requirement amounted to a complete ban on functional firearms and prohibition on use for self-defense:

Section 7-2507.02, like the bar on carrying a pistol within the home, amounts to a complete prohibition on the lawful use of handguns for self-defense. As such, we hold it unconstitutional.

In her dissent, Circuit Judge Henderson stated that Second Amendment rights did not extend to residents of District of Columbia, writing:

To sum up, there is no dispute that the Constitution, case law and applicable statutes all establish that the District is not a State within the meaning of the Second Amendment. Under United States v. Miller, 307 U.S. at 178, the Second Amendment's declaration and guarantee that "the right of the people to keep and bear Arms, shall not be infringed" relates to the Militia of the States only. That the Second Amendment does not apply to the District, then, is, to me, an unavoidable conclusion.

In April 2007, the District and Mayor Adrian Fenty petitioned for rehearing en banc, arguing that the ruling created inter- and intra-jurisdictional conflict. On May 8, the Court of Appeals for the D.C. Circuit denied the request to rehear the case, by a 6–4 vote.

== Supreme Court ==
The defendants petitioned the United States Supreme Court to hear the case. The Supreme Court granted certiorari on November 20, 2007. The court rephrased the question to be decided as follows:

The petition for a writ of certiorari is granted limited to the following question: Whether the following provisions, D.C. Code §§ 7-2502.02(a)(4), 22–4504(a), and 7-2507.02, violate the Second Amendment rights of individuals who are not affiliated with any state-regulated militia, but who wish to keep handguns and other firearms for private use in their homes.

This represented the first time since the 1939 case United States v. Miller that the Supreme Court had directly addressed the scope of the Second Amendment.

=== Amicus curiae briefs ===
Because of the controversial nature of the case, it garnered much attention from many groups on both sides of the gun rights issue. Many of those groups filed amicus curiae (friend of the court) briefs, about 47 urging the court to affirm the case and about 20 to remand it.

A majority of the members of Congress signed the brief authored by Stephen Halbrook advising that the case be affirmed overturning the ban on handguns not otherwise restricted by Congress. Vice President Dick Cheney joined in this brief, acting in his role as President of the United States Senate, and breaking with the George W. Bush administration's official position. Arizona Senator John McCain, Republican, also signed the brief. Then-Illinois Senator Barack Obama did not.

A majority of the states signed the brief of Texas Attorney General Greg Abbott, authored by Abbott's solicitor general, Ted Cruz, advising that the case be affirmed, while at the same time emphasizing that the states have a strong interest in maintaining each of the states' laws prohibiting and regulating firearms. Law enforcement organizations, including the Fraternal Order of Police and the Southern States Police Benevolent Association, also filed a brief urging that the case be affirmed.

A number of organizations signed friend of the court briefs advising that the case be remanded, including the United States Department of Justice and Attorneys General of New York, Hawaii, Maryland, Massachusetts, New Jersey, and Puerto Rico. Additionally, friend of the court briefs to remand were filed by a spectrum of religious and anti-violence groups, a number of cities and mayors, and many police chiefs and law enforcement organizations.

A collection of organizations and prominent scholars, represented by attorney Jeffrey Teichert, submitted an "errors brief" arguing that many of the common historical and factual "myths and misrepresentations" generally offered in favor of banning handguns were in error. Teichert's brief argued from a historical perspective that the Second Amendment protected an individual right to keep and bear arms.

=== Oral arguments ===
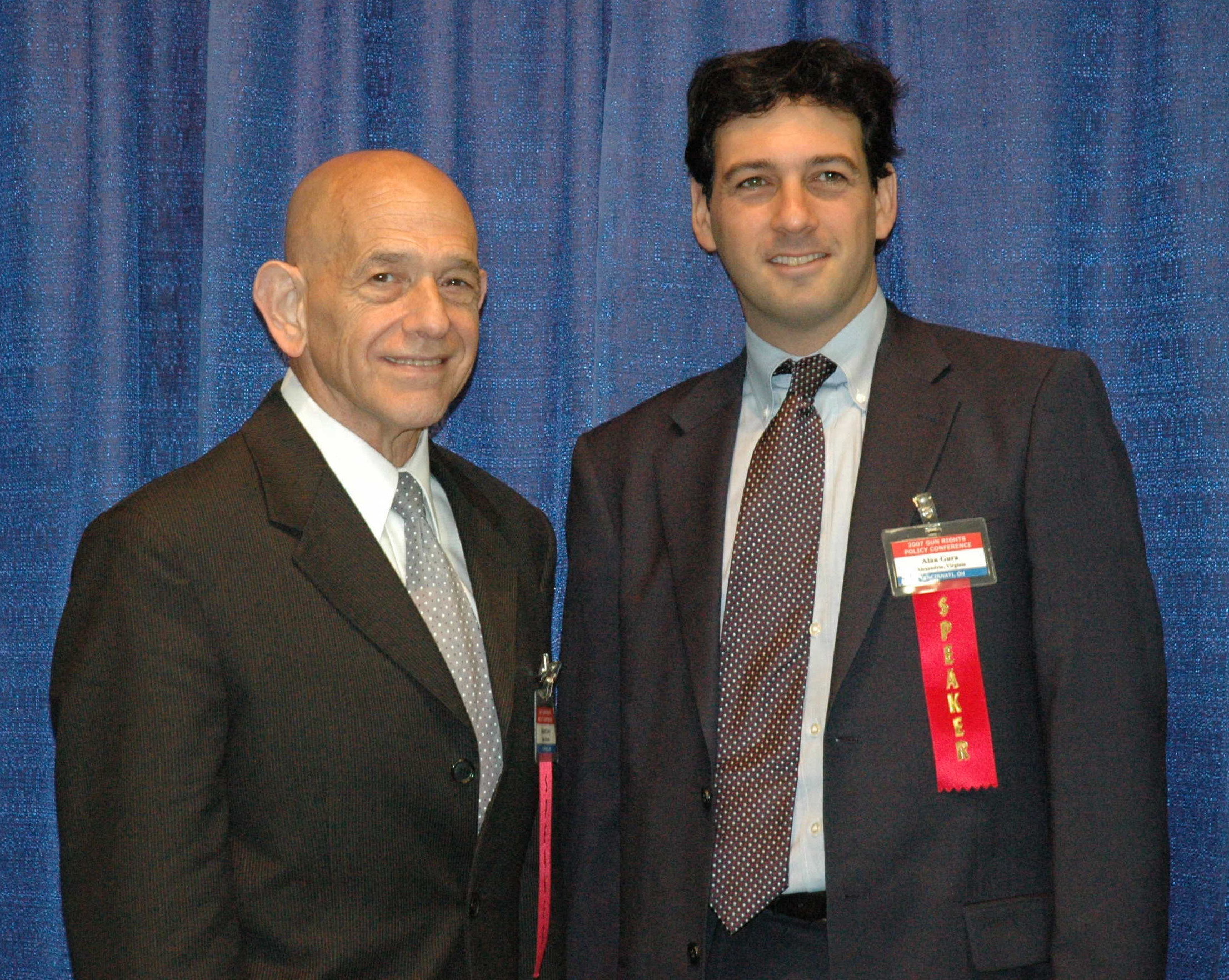
Robert A. Levy (left) and Alan Gura, counsel for Heller

The Supreme Court heard oral arguments in the case on March 18, 2008. Both the transcript and the audio of the argument have been released. Each side was initially allotted 30 minutes to argue its case, with U.S. Solicitor General Paul D. Clement allotted 15 minutes to present the federal government's views. During the argument, however, extra time was extended to the parties, and the argument ran 23 minutes over the allotted time.

Walter E. Dellinger of the law firm O'Melveny & Myers, also a professor at Duke University Law School and former Acting Solicitor General, argued the District's side before the Supreme Court. Dellinger was assisted by Thomas Goldstein of Akin Gump Strauss Hauer & Feld, Robert Long of Covington & Burling and D.C. Solicitor General Todd Kim. The law firms assisting the District worked pro bono.

Alan Gura, of the D.C.-based law firm Gura & Possessky, was lead counsel for Heller, and argued on his behalf before the Supreme Court. Robert Levy, a senior fellow at the Cato Institute, and Clark Neily, a senior attorney at the Institute for Justice, were his co-counsel.

=== Decision ===
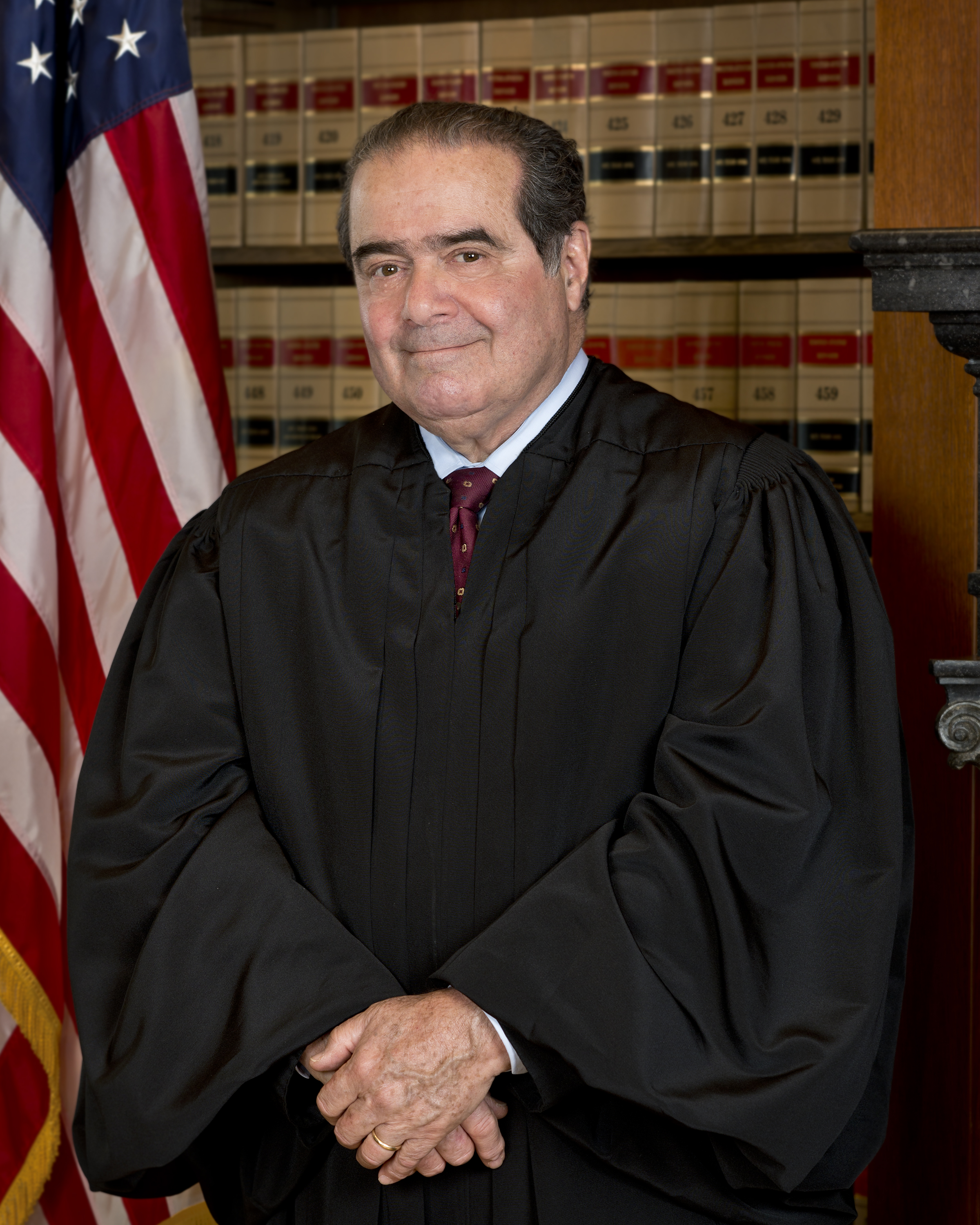
Antonin Scalia delivered the opinion of the Court

The Supreme Court held:

(1) The Second Amendment protects an individual right to possess a firearm unconnected with service in a militia, and to use that arm for traditionally lawful purposes, such as self-defense within the home. Pp. 2–53.

(a) The Amendment's prefatory clause announces a purpose, but does not limit or expand the scope of the second part, the operative clause. The operative clause's text and history demonstrate that it connotes an individual right to keep and bear arms. Pp. 2–22.

(b) The prefatory clause comports with the Court's interpretation of the operative clause. The "militia" comprised all males physically capable of acting in concert for the common defense. The Antifederalists feared that the Federal Government would disarm the people in order to disable this citizens' militia, enabling a politicized standing army or a select militia to rule. The response was to deny Congress power to abridge the ancient right of individuals to keep and bear arms, so that the ideal of a citizens' militia would be preserved. Pp. 22–28.

(c) The Court's interpretation is confirmed by analogous arms-bearing rights in state constitutions that preceded and immediately followed the Second Amendment. Pp. 28–30.

(d) The Second Amendment's drafting history, while of dubious interpretive worth, reveals three state Second Amendment proposals that unequivocally referred to an individual right to bear arms. Pp. 30–32.

(e) Interpretation of the Second Amendment by scholars, courts and legislators, from immediately after its ratification through the late 19th century also supports the Court's conclusion. Pp. 32–47.

(f) None of the Court's precedents forecloses the Court's interpretation. Neither United States v. Cruikshank, 92 U.S. 542 (1876), nor Presser v. Illinois, 116 U.S. 252 (1886), refutes the individual-rights interpretation. United States v. Miller, 307 U.S. 174 (1939), does not limit the right to keep and bear arms to militia purposes, but rather limits the type of weapon to which the right applies to those used by the militia, i.e., those in common use for lawful purposes.

(2) Like most rights, the Second Amendment right is not unlimited. It is not a right to keep and carry any weapon whatsoever in any manner whatsoever and for whatever purpose: For example, concealed weapons prohibitions have been upheld under the Amendment or state analogues. The Court's opinion should not be taken to cast doubt on longstanding prohibitions on the possession of firearms by felons and the mentally ill, or laws forbidding the carrying of firearms in sensitive places such as schools and government buildings, or laws imposing conditions and qualifications on the commercial sale of arms. Miller's holding that the sorts of weapons protected are those "in common use at the time" finds support in the historical tradition of prohibiting the carrying of dangerous and unusual weapons. Pp. 54–56.

(3) The handgun ban and the trigger-lock requirement (as applied to self-defense) violate the Second Amendment. The District's total ban on handgun possession in the home amounts to a prohibition on an entire class of "arms" that Americans overwhelmingly choose for the lawful purpose of self-defense. Under any of the standards of scrutiny the Court has applied to enumerated constitutional rights, this prohibition – in the place where the importance of the lawful defense of self, family, and property is most acute – would fail constitutional muster. Similarly, the requirement that any lawful firearm in the home be disassembled or bound by a trigger lock makes it impossible for citizens to use arms for the core lawful purpose of self-defense and is hence unconstitutional. Because Heller conceded at oral argument that the D.C. licensing law is permissible if it is not enforced arbitrarily and capriciously, the Court assumes that a license will satisfy his prayer for relief and does not address the licensing requirement. Assuming he is not disqualified from exercising Second Amendment rights, the District must permit Heller to register his handgun and must issue him a license to carry it in the home. Pp. 56–64.

The Opinion of the Court, delivered by Justice Scalia, was joined by Chief Justice John G. Roberts, Jr. and by Justices Anthony M. Kennedy, Clarence Thomas and Samuel Alito.

==== Second Amendment findings and reasoning ====
The Illinois Supreme Court in People v. Aguilar (2013), summed up Heller's findings and reasoning:

In District of Columbia v. Heller, 554 U.S. 570 (2008), the Supreme Court undertook its first-ever "in-depth examination" of the second amendment's meaning Id. at 635. After a lengthy historical discussion, the Court ultimately concluded that the second amendment "guarantee[s] the individual right to possess and carry weapons in case of confrontation" (id. at 592); that "central to" this right is "the inherent right of self-defense"(id. at 628); that "the home" is "where the need for defense of self, family, and property is most acute" (id. at 628); and that, "above all other interests," the second amendment elevates "the right of law-abiding, responsible citizens to use arms in defense of hearth and home" (id. at 635). Based on this understanding, the Court held that a District of Columbia law banning handgun possession in the home violated the second amendment. Id. at 635.

=== Issues addressed by the majority ===
The core holding in D.C. v. Heller is that the right to keep and bear arms is an individual right intimately tied to the natural right of self-defense.

The Scalia majority invokes much historical material to support its finding that the right to keep and bear arms belongs to individuals; more precisely, Scalia asserts in the Court's opinion that the "people" to whom the Second Amendment right is accorded are the same "people" who enjoy First and Fourth Amendment protection: "' The Constitution was written to be understood by the voters; its words and phrases were used in their normal and ordinary as distinguished from technical meaning. United States v. Sprague, 282 U.S. 716, 731 (1931); see also Gibbons v. Ogden, 9 Wheat. 1, 188 (1824). Normal meaning may, of course, include an idiomatic meaning, but it excludes secret or technical meanings ... ."

With that finding as an anchor, the Court ruled a total ban on operative handguns in the home is unconstitutional, as the ban runs afoul of both the self-defense purpose of the Second Amendment – a purpose not previously articulated by the Court – and the "in common use at the time" prong of the Miller decision: Since handguns are in common use, their ownership is protected.

The Court applies as the remedy that "[a]ssuming that Heller is not disqualified from the exercise of Second Amendment rights, the District must permit him to register his handgun and must issue him a license to carry it in the home." The Court, additionally, hinted that other remedy might be available in the form of eliminating the license requirement for carrying in the home, but that no such relief had been requested: "Respondent conceded at oral argument that he does not 'have a problem with ... licensing' and that the District's law is permissible so long as it is 'not enforced in an arbitrary and capricious manner.' Tr. of Oral Arg. 74–75. We, therefore, assume that petitioners' issuance of a license will satisfy respondent's prayer for relief and do not address the licensing requirement."

In regard to the scope of the right, the Court wrote, in an obiter dictum, "Although we do not undertake an exhaustive historical analysis today of the full scope of the Second Amendment, nothing in our opinion should be taken to cast doubt on longstanding prohibitions on the possession of firearms by felons and the mentally ill, or laws forbidding the carrying of firearms in sensitive places such as schools and government buildings, or laws imposing conditions and qualifications on the commercial sale of arms."

The Court also added dicta regarding the private ownership of machine guns. In doing so, it suggested the elevation of the "in common use at the time" prong of the Miller decision, which by itself protects handguns, over the first prong (protecting arms that "have some reasonable relationship to the preservation or efficiency of a well regulated militia"), which may not by itself protect machine guns: "It may be objected that if weapons that are most useful in military service – M16 rifles and the like – may be banned, then the Second Amendment right is completely detached from the prefatory clause. But as we have said, the conception of the militia at the time of the Second Amendment's ratification was the body of all citizens capable of military service, who would bring the sorts of lawful weapons that they possessed at home to militia duty."

The Court did not address which level of judicial review should be used by lower courts in deciding future cases claiming infringement of the right to keep and bear arms: "[S]ince this case represents this Court's first in-depth examination of the Second Amendment, one should not expect it to clarify the entire field." The Court states, "If all that was required to overcome the right to keep and bear arms was a rational basis, the Second Amendment would be redundant with the separate constitutional prohibitions on irrational laws, and would have no effect." Also, regarding Justice Breyer's proposal of a "judge-empowering 'interest-balancing inquiry'," the Court states, "We know of no other enumerated constitutional right whose core protection has been subjected to a freestanding 'interest-balancing' approach."

=== Dissenting opinions ===
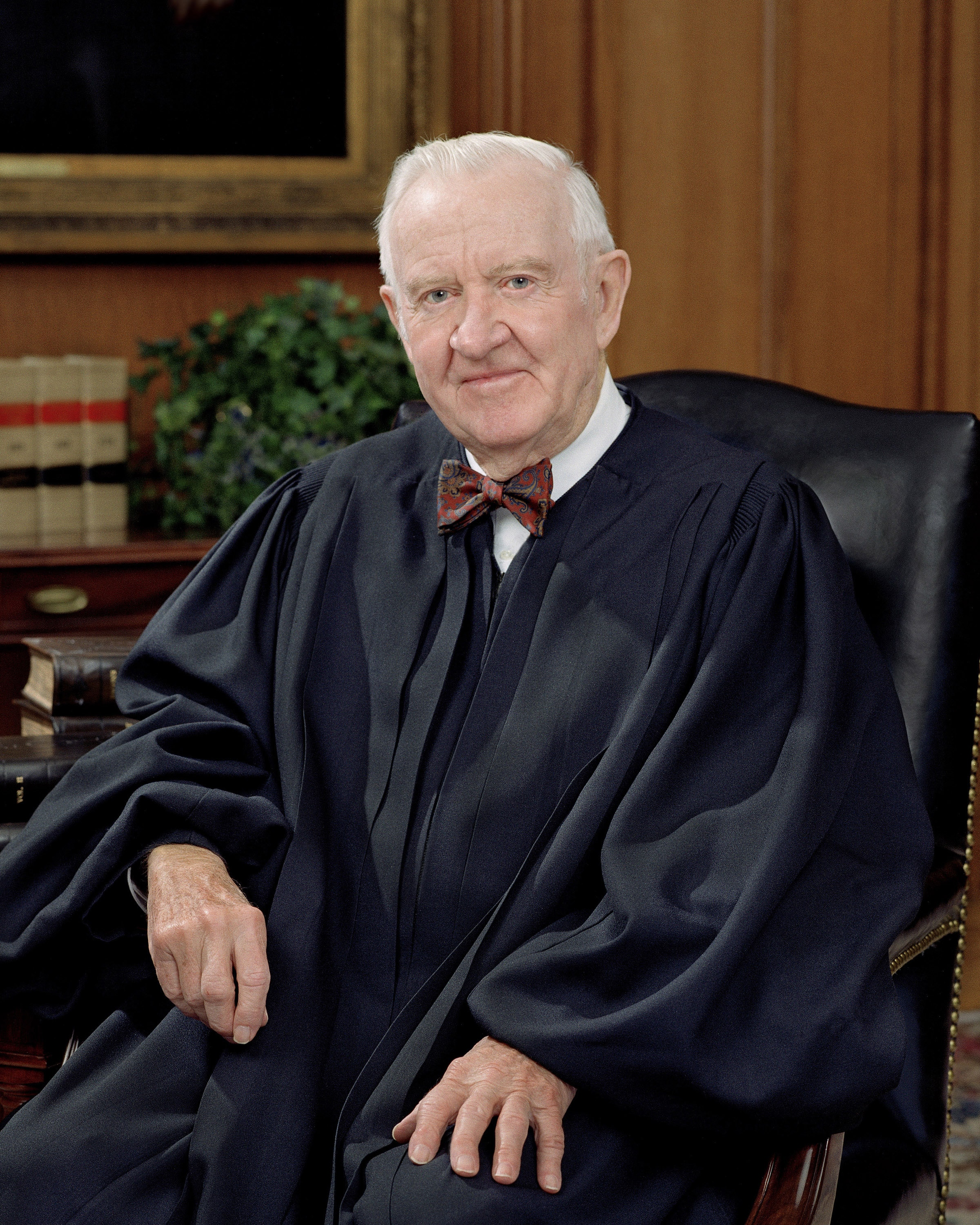
John Paul Stevens delivered a dissenting opinion of the Court

In a dissenting opinion, Justice John Paul Stevens stated that the court's judgment was "a strained and unpersuasive reading" which overturned longstanding precedent, and that the court had bestowed "a dramatic upheaval in the law". Stevens also stated that the amendment was notable for the "omission of any statement of purpose related to the right to use firearms for hunting or personal self-defense" which was present in the Declarations of Rights of Pennsylvania and Vermont.

The Stevens dissent seems to rest on four main points of disagreement: that the Founders would have made the individual right aspect of the Second Amendment express if that was what was intended; that the "militia" preamble and exact phrase "to keep and bear arms" demands the conclusion that the Second Amendment touches on state militia service only; that many lower courts' later "collective-right" reading of the Miller decision constitutes stare decisis, which may only be overturned at great peril; and that the Court has not considered gun-control laws (e.g., the National Firearms Act) unconstitutional. The dissent concludes, "The Court would have us believe that over 200 years ago, the Framers made a choice to limit the tools available to elected officials wishing to regulate civilian uses of weapons.... I could not possibly conclude that the Framers made such a choice."

Justice Stevens's dissent was joined by Justices David Souter, Ruth Bader Ginsburg, and Stephen Breyer.

Justice Breyer filed a separate dissenting opinion, joined by the same dissenting Justices, which sought to demonstrate that, starting from the premise of an individual-rights view, the District of Columbia's handgun ban and trigger lock requirement would nevertheless be permissible limitations on the right.

The Breyer dissent looks to early municipal fire-safety laws that forbade the storage of gunpowder (and in Boston the carrying of loaded arms into certain buildings), and on nuisance laws providing fines or loss of firearm for imprudent usage, as demonstrating the Second Amendment has been understood to have no impact on the regulation of civilian firearms. The dissent argues the public safety necessity of gun-control laws, quoting that "guns were responsible for 69 deaths in this country each day.'"

With these two supports, the Breyer dissent goes on to conclude, "there simply is no untouchable constitutional right guaranteed by the Second Amendment to keep loaded handguns in the house in crime-ridden urban areas." It proposes that firearms laws be reviewed by balancing the interests (i.e., "'interest-balancing' approach") of Second Amendment protections against the government's compelling interest of preventing crime.

The Breyer dissent also objected to the "common use" distinction used by the majority to distinguish handguns from machine guns: "But what sense does this approach make? According to the majority's reasoning, if Congress and the States lift restrictions on the possession and use of machineguns, and people buy machineguns to protect their homes, the Court will have to reverse course and find that the Second Amendment does, in fact, protect the individual self-defense-related right to possess a machine-gun...There is no basis for believing that the Framers intended such circular reasoning."

== Non-party involvement ==
=== National Rifle Association (NRA) ===
Attorney Alan Gura, in a 2003 filing, used the term "sham litigation" to describe the NRA's attempts to have Parker (aka Heller) consolidated with its own case challenging the D.C. law. Gura also stated that "the NRA was adamant about not wanting the Supreme Court to hear the case". These concerns were based on NRA lawyers' assessment that the justices at the time the case was filed might reach an unfavorable decision. Cato Institute senior fellow Robert Levy, co-counsel to the Parker plaintiffs, has stated that the Parker plaintiffs "faced repeated attempts by the NRA to derail the litigation." He also stated that "The N.R.A.'s interference in this process set us back and almost killed the case. It was a very acrimonious relationship."

Wayne LaPierre, the NRA's chief executive officer at the time, confirmed the NRA's misgivings. "There was a real dispute on our side among the constitutional scholars about whether there was a majority of justices on the Supreme Court who would support the Constitution as written," LaPierre said. Both Levy and LaPierre said the NRA and Levy's team were now on good terms.

Elaine McArdle wrote in the Harvard Law Bulletin: "If Parker is the long-awaited "clean" case, one reason may be that proponents of the individual-rights view of the Second Amendment – including the National Rifle Association, which filed an amicus brief in the case – have learned from earlier defeats, and crafted strategies to maximize the chances of Supreme Court review." The NRA did eventually support the litigation by filing an amicus brief with the Court arguing that the plaintiffs in Parker had standing to sue and that the D.C. ban was unconstitutional under the Second Amendment.

Chris Cox, executive director of the NRA's Institute for Legislative Action, had indicated support of federal legislation which would repeal the D.C. gun ban. Opponents of the legislation argued that this would have rendered the Parker case moot, and would have effectively eliminated the possibility that the case would be heard by the Supreme Court.

Immediately after the Supreme Court's ruling, the NRA filed a lawsuit against the city of Chicago over its handgun ban, followed the next day by a lawsuit against the city of San Francisco over its ban of handguns in public housing.

=== Brady Campaign to Prevent Gun Violence ===
The Brady Campaign to Prevent Gun Violence opposed the arguments made by the plaintiffs in Parker, and filed amicus curiae against those arguments in both the District and Circuit courts.

Paul Helmke, the president of the Brady Campaign, suggested to D.C. before the Court granted certiorari that it modify its gun laws rather than appeal to the Supreme Court. Helmke has written that if the Supreme Court upholds the Circuit court ruling, it "could lead to all current and proposed firearms laws being called into question."

After the ruling, Paul Helmke stated that, "the classic 'slippery slope' argument", "that even modest gun control would lead down the path to a complete ban on gun ownership", "is now gone." Helmke added that, "The Court also rejected the absolutist misreading of the Second Amendment that some use to argue 'any gun, any time for anyone,' which many politicians have used as an excuse to do nothing about the scourge of gun violence in our country and to block passage of common sense gun laws."

== Reactions ==
=== To the lower court rulings ===
Various experts expressed opinions on the D.C. Circuit's decision.

Harvard Law School professor Laurence Tribe contended that the Second Amendment protects an individual right, and predicted that if Parker is reviewed by the Supreme Court "there's a really quite decent chance that it will be affirmed." However, Tribe has also argued that the District's ban on one class of weapons does not violate the Second Amendment even under an individual rights view.

Erwin Chemerinsky, then of Duke Law School and now dean of the University of California, Berkeley School of Law, argued that the District of Columbia's handgun laws, even assuming an "individual rights" interpretation of the Second Amendment, could be justified as reasonable regulations and thus upheld as constitutional. Chemerinsky believes that the regulation of guns should be analyzed in the same way "as other regulation of property under modern constitutional law" and "be allowed so long as it is rationally related to achieving a legitimate government purpose." However, the dicta in Heller suggests that applying a mere rational basis analysis is an incorrect reading of the Constitution and would, in fact, defeat the entire purpose of the Second Amendment.

=== To the Supreme Court rulings ===
Cato Institute senior fellow Robert Levy, co-counsel to the Parker plaintiffs, agreed with the court's ruling but describes that his interpretation of the Second Amendment would not preclude all governmental regulation of private ownership of weapons:

Even the NRA concedes that you can't have mad men running around with weapons of mass destruction. So there are some restrictions that are permissible and it will be the task of the legislature and the courts to ferret all of that out and draw the lines. I am sure, though, that outright bans on handguns like they have in D.C. won't be permitted. That is not a reasonable restriction under anybody's characterization. It is not a restriction, it's a prohibition.

Clark Neily, an attorney for Dick Heller in this case, has said regarding Heller:

America went over 200 years without knowing whether a key provision of the Bill of Rights actually meant anything. We came within one vote of being told that it did not, notwithstanding what amounts to a national consensus that the Second Amendment means what it says: The right of the people to keep and bear arms shall not be infringed. Taking rights seriously, including rights we might not favor personally, is good medicine for the body politic, and Heller was an excellent dose.

Richard Posner, judge for the United States Court of Appeals for the Seventh Circuit, compares Heller to Roe v. Wade, stating that it created a federal constitutional right that did not previously exist, and he asserts that the originalist method – to which Justice Antonin Scalia claimed to adhere – would have yielded the opposite result of the majority opinion.

The text of the amendment, whether viewed alone or in light of the concerns that actuated its adoption, creates no right to the private possession of guns for hunting or other sport, or for the defense of person or property. It is doubtful that the amendment could even be thought to require that members of state militias be allowed to keep weapons in their homes, since that would reduce the militias' effectiveness. Suppose part of a state's militia was engaged in combat and needed additional weaponry. Would the militia's commander have to collect the weapons from the homes of militiamen who had not been mobilized, as opposed to obtaining them from a storage facility? Since the purpose of the Second Amendment, judging from its language and background, was to assure the effectiveness of state militias, an interpretation that undermined their effectiveness by preventing states from making efficient arrangements for the storage and distribution of military weapons would not make sense.

J. Harvie Wilkinson III, chief judge of United States Court of Appeals for the Fourth Circuit, consents to Posner's analysis, stating that Heller "encourages Americans to do what conservative jurists warned for years they should not do: bypass the ballot and seek to press their political agenda in the courts."

Heller thus represents the worst of missed opportunities—the chance to ground conservative jurisprudence in enduring and consistent principles of restraint. The Constitution expresses the need for judicial restraint in many different ways—separation of powers, federalism, and the grant of life tenure to unelected judges among them. It is an irony that Heller would in the name of originalism abandon insights so central to the Framers' designs.

Alan Gura, Lead Counsel for Respondent in Heller rejects Wilkinson's criticism, stating that "Rather, the Court affirmed the Second Amendment's original public meaning, as confirmed by its plain text. Having determined the Amendment's meaning, the Court showed the proper level of deference to the D.C. City Council's outright repudiation of the constitutional text: none."

== Post-ruling impacts ==
Since the June 2008 ruling, over 80 different cases have been heard in lower federal courts on the constitutionality of a wide variety of gun control laws. These courts have heard lawsuits in regard to bans of firearm possession by felons, drug addicts, illegal immigrants, and individuals convicted of domestic violence misdemeanors. Also, cases have been heard on the constitutionality of laws prohibiting certain types of weapons, such as machine guns, sawed-off shotguns and/or specific types of weapons attachments. In addition, courts have heard challenges to laws barring guns in post offices and near schools and laws outlawing "straw" purchases, carrying of concealed weapons, types of ammunition and possession of unregistered firearms. There have been as of May 2019 more than 1,370 Second Amendment cases nationwide which challenged restrictive gun laws of various kinds since the Supreme Court issued its decision in Heller. In most cases the gun safety law or criminal conviction at issue has been however upheld by the lower courts. Provided with only minimum guidance from the Supreme Court in Heller the lower courts were tasked with defining the scope of the Second Amendment rights and the proper standard of review for evaluating Second Amendment claims in the aforementioned cases.

The courts have upheld most of the above-mentioned laws as being constitutional. The basis for the lower court rulings is the dicta in the paragraph near the end of the Heller ruling that states:

Nothing in our opinion should be taken to cast doubt on longstanding prohibitions on the possession of firearms by felons and the mentally ill, or laws forbidding the carrying of firearms in sensitive places such as schools and government buildings, or laws imposing conditions on the commercial sale of arms.

Consistently since the Heller ruling, the lower federal courts have ruled that almost all gun control measures as presently legislated are lawful and that according to UCLA professor of constitutional law Adam Winkler: "What gun rights advocates are discovering is that the vast majority of gun control laws fit within these categories."

Robert Levy, the executive director of the Cato Institute who funded the Heller litigation has commented on this passage describing constitutionally acceptable forms of prohibitions of firearms: "I would have preferred that that not have been there," and that this paragraph in Scalia's opinion "created more confusion than light."

Similar to the lifting of gun bans mentioned previously in the settlements of lawsuits filed post-Heller, in US v. Arzberger, also decided post-Heller, it was noted:

To the extent, then, that the Second Amendment creates an individual right to possess a firearm unrelated to any military purpose, it also establishes a protectible liberty interest. And, although the Supreme Court has indicated that this privilege may be withdrawn from some groups of persons such as convicted felons, there is no basis for categorically depriving persons who are merely accused of certain crimes of the right to legal possession of a firearm.

=== District of Columbia ===
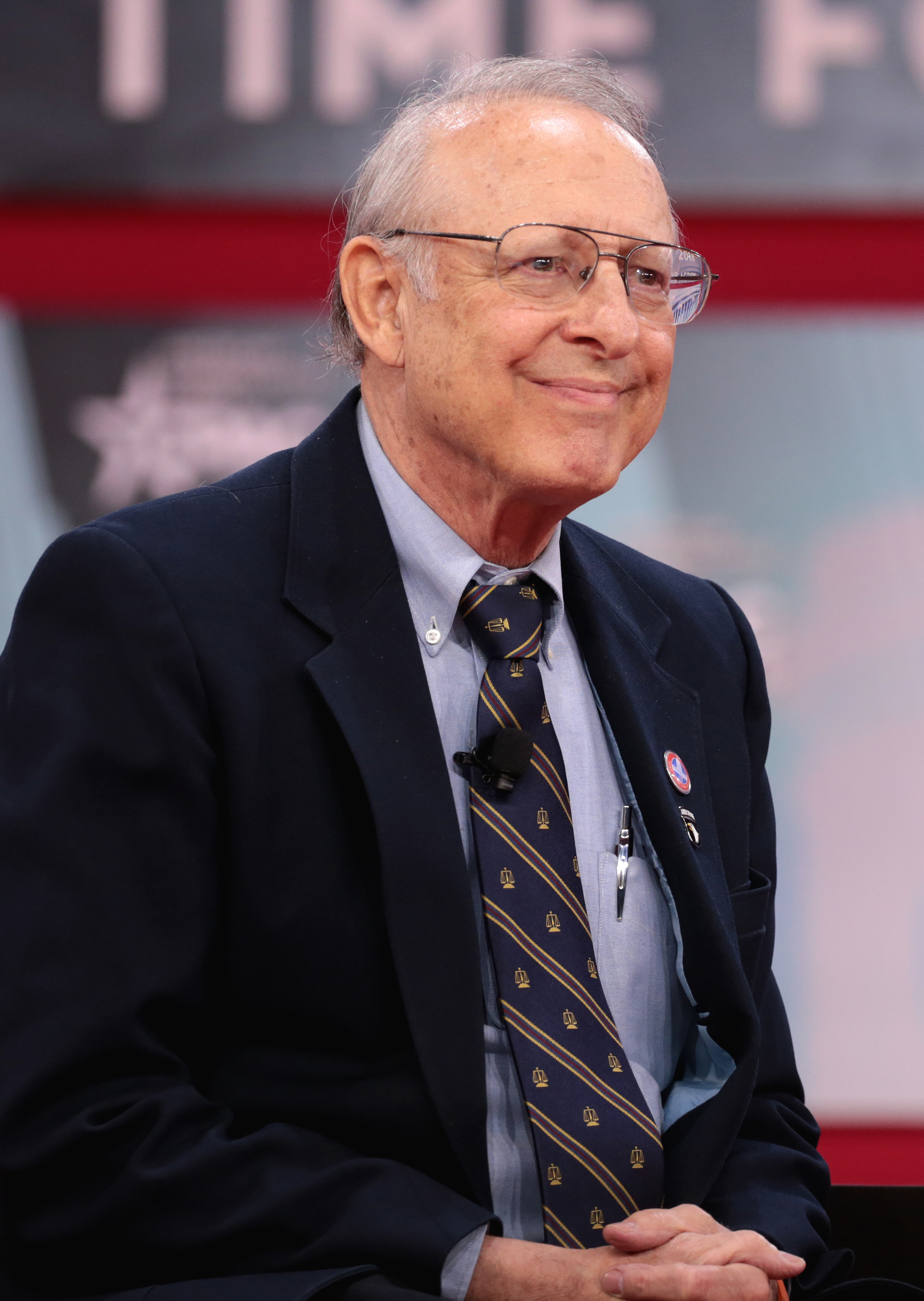
Dick Heller, pictured here in 2018

The D.C. government indicated it would continue to use zoning ordinances to prevent firearms dealers from operating and selling to citizens residing in the District, meaning it would continue to be difficult for residents to legally purchase guns in the District. Additionally, the District enacted new firearms restrictions in an effort to cure the constitutional defects in the ordinance that the Supreme Court had identified in Heller. The new provisions were: (1) the firearms registration procedures; (2) the prohibition on assault weapons; and (3) the prohibition on large capacity ammunition feeding devices. In response, Dick Heller challenged these new restrictions filing a civil suit named Heller v. District of Columbia (Civil Action No. 08-1289 (RMU), No. 23., 25) where he requested a summary judgment to vacate the new prohibitions. On March 26, 2010, the D.C. District Judge Ricardo M. Urbina denied Dick Heller's request and granted the cross motion, stating that the court "concludes that the regulatory provisions that the plaintiffs challenge permissibly regulate the exercise of the core Second Amendment right to use arms for the purpose of self-defense in the home."

Dick Heller's application to register his semi-automatic pistol was rejected because the gun was a bottom-loading weapon, and according to the District's interpretation, all bottom-loading guns, including magazine-fed non-assault-style rifles, are outlawed because they are grouped with machine guns. Revolvers will likely not fall under such a ban.

On December 16, 2008, the D.C. Council unanimously passed the Firearms Registration Emergency Amendment Act of 2008 which addresses the issues raised in the Heller Supreme Court decision, and also puts in place a number of registration requirements to update and strengthen the District's gun laws.

Justice Antonin Scalia's opinion for the majority provided Second Amendment protection for commonly used and popular handguns but not for atypical arms or arms used for unlawful purposes, such as short-barreled shotguns. Scalia stated: "Whatever the reason, handguns are the most popular weapon chosen by Americans for self-defense in the home, and a complete prohibition of their use is invalid." "We think that Miller's "ordinary military equipment" language must be read in tandem with what comes after: "[O]rdinarily when called for [militia] service [able-bodied] men were expected to appear bearing arms supplied by themselves and of the kind in common use at the time." 307 U. S., at 179." "We therefore read Miller to say only that the Second Amendment does not protect those weapons not typically possessed by law-abiding citizens for lawful purposes, such as short-barreled shotguns." "It may be objected that if weapons that are most useful in military service – M-16 rifles and the like – may be banned, then the Second Amendment right is completely detached from the prefatory clause. But as we have said, the conception of the militia at the time of the Second Amendment's ratification was the body of all citizens capable of military service, who would bring the sorts of lawful weapons that they possessed at home to militia duty."

On July 24, 2014, the U.S. District Court for the District of Columbia ruled, in Palmer v. District of Columbia, that the District's total ban on the public carrying of ready-to-use handguns is unconstitutional. In its decision, the Court stated: "[ . . . ] the Court finds that the District of Columbia's complete ban on the carrying of handguns in public is unconstitutional. Accordingly, the Court grants Plaintiffs' motion for summary judgment and enjoins Defendants from enforcing the home limitations of D.C. Code § 7-2502.02(a)(4) and enforcing D.C. Code § 22-4504(a) unless and until such time as the District of Columbia adopts a licensing mechanism consistent with constitutional standards enabling people to exercise their Second Amendment right to bear arms. Furthermore, this injunction prohibits the District from completely banning the carrying of handguns in public for self-defense by otherwise qualified non-residents based solely on the fact that they are not residents of the District."

=== New York ===
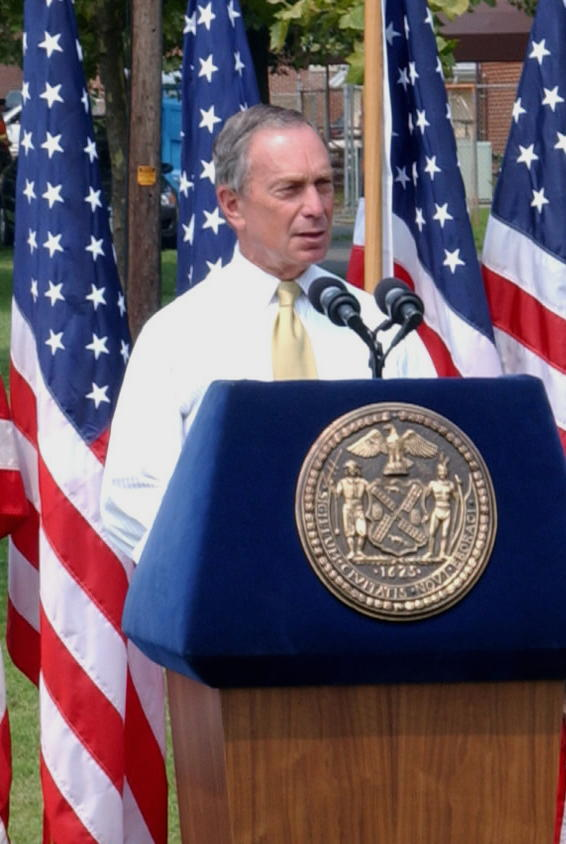
Bloomberg delivering a speech

Mayor of New York City Michael Bloomberg said that "all of the laws on the books in New York State and New York City" would be allowed by the ruling as "reasonable regulation." Robert Levy has stated that the current New York City gun laws are "not much different" from the D.C. ban that has been overturned. The National Rifle Association and other gun-rights advocates have not ruled out suing New York City, especially over the definition of "reasonable regulation".

Southern District of New York Magistrate Judge James Francis has said that, prior to Heller, it would not have been considered unreasonable to require a defendant to surrender a firearm as a condition of pretrial release. Specifically, according to Judge Francis:

This all changed, with the recent U.S. Supreme Court decision in District of Columbia v. Heller; 128 S.Ct. 2783 (2008), where the court changed the course of Second Amendment jurisprudence by creating what he said was a "protectible liberty interest" in the possession of firearms. Thus, in the absence of an individualized determination at a bail hearing, requiring the defendant to give up any firearms violates due process.

Maloney v. Rice (a.k.a. Maloney v. Cuomo and Maloney v. Spitzer), 554 F.3d 56 (2d. Cir. 2009) originally held that the 2nd Amendment does not apply to the states in the Second Circuit. The case involved a state ban on nunchaku (a martial arts weapon) in New York. In a memorandum opinion dated June 29, 2010, the Supreme Court vacated the Second Circuit decision in Maloney and remanded for further consideration in light of the holding in McDonald v. City of Chicago that the Second Amendment does apply to the states. The Second Circuit has remanded the case to the trial court.

=== Illinois ===
The NRA has filed five related lawsuits since the Heller decision. In four Illinois lawsuits, the NRA sought to have the Second Amendment incorporated by the Fourteenth Amendment, causing the Second Amendment to apply to state and local jurisdictions and not just to the federal government. Three Illinois lawsuits have been negotiated and settled out of court involving agreements that repeal gun ban ordinances and did not result in incorporation of the Second Amendment to state and local jurisdictions. The fourth NRA lawsuit against Chicago was rejected. The NRA appealed the case to the 7th Circuit Court of Appeals. On June 2, 2009, the Court of Appeals affirmed the district court's decision, based on the theory that Heller applied only to the Federal Government (including the District of Columbia), and not to states or their subordinate jurisdictions. This opinion directly conflicts with the 9th Circuit Court of Appeals' earlier decision, holding that Heller applies to states as well.

On June 28, 2010, the Supreme Court reversed the Court of Appeals for the Seventh Circuit's decision in McDonald v. City of Chicago and remanded it back to Seventh Circuit to resolve conflicts between certain Chicago gun restrictions and the Second Amendment. Chicago's handgun law was likened to the D.C. handgun ban by Justice Breyer.

Similarly, three Illinois municipalities with gun control measures on the books that previously had banned all handguns have rescinded their handgun bans. These cities were Morton Grove, Illinois, Wilmette, another Illinois village, and Evanston, Illinois which enacted a partial repeal of its handgun ban.

In Ezell v. Chicago, decided July 6, 2011, the Seventh Circuit reversed a district court decision that the post-McDonald measures adopted by the City of Chicago were constitutional. The Chicago law required firearms training in a shooting range in order to obtain a gun permit, but also banned shooting ranges within the City of Chicago. The city had argued that applicants could obtain their training at gun ranges in the suburbs. The opinion noted that Chicago could not infringe Second Amendment rights on the grounds that they could be exercised elsewhere, any more than it could infringe the right to freedom of speech on the grounds that citizens could speak elsewhere.

=== California ===
On January 14, 2009, in Guy Montag Doe v. San Francisco Housing Authority, the San Francisco Housing Authority reached a settlement out of court with the NRA, which allows residents to possess legal firearms within a SFHA apartment building. The San Francisco lawsuit resulted in the elimination of the gun ban from the SF Housing Authority residential lease terms. Tim Larsen speaking for the Housing Authority said that they never intended to enforce its 2005 housing lease gun ban against law-abiding gun owners and have never done so.

=== Idaho ===
On January 10, 2014, in Morris v. U.S. Army Corps of Engineers, the District Court struck down a Corps of Engineers regulation barring possession of loaded guns in recreation areas surrounding Corps dams. The court held that tents are akin to homes, and under Heller, Second Amendment rights are protected.

== Legacy ==
Justice Stevens later called the decision "unquestionably the most clearly incorrect decision that the Supreme Court announced during my tenure on the bench" and called for a Constitutional amendment overruling it.

Stephen Halbrook, a lawyer and Second Amendment analyst who successfully argued three firearms-related cases before the Supreme Court, concluded the majority's opinion in Heller "relied on text, history, and tradition." Halbrook asserted that the individual right to bear arms was not an invention of gun rights activists in the preceding few decades, but was in fact a textualist interpretation confirmed by the historical context of the Second Amendment. This included the English Declaration of Rights of 1689, as well as "post-ratification commentary, antebellum judicial opinions, Reconstruction legislation, and post-Civil War commentary."

The Court's statement that the right secured by the Second Amendment is limited has been widely discussed by lower courts and the media. According to Justice John Paul Stevens, he was able to persuade Justice Anthony M. Kennedy to ask for "some important changes" to Justice Scalia's opinion, so that the final version of Heller "should not be taken to cast doubt" on the many gun laws existing in the United States.

The decision in this case led to the Supreme Court Case New York State Rifle & Pistol Association, Inc. v. Bruen (2022) that ruled that the ability to carry a pistol in public was a constitutional right guaranteed by the Second Amendment.

The New York Times in November 2026 found that the "dangerous and unusual" phrase used in Scalia's opinion, cited to 18th century British jurist William Blackstone's Commentaries on the Laws of England, was incorrectly quoted, as Blackstone had used "dangerous or unusual" to describe when restrictions on weapons should be in place. Because of this, instead of only considering if guns were dangerous, cases since Heller had had to focus on proving the specific weapons banned were unusual. The Times stated 98 cases brought by pro-gun ownership groups have focused on this language from Heller to overturn gun laws, with 20 of those challenges being successful.

== See also ==
- List of United States Supreme Court cases, volume 554
- List of United States Supreme Court cases
- Firearm case law in the United States
- Gun politics in the United States
- Incorporation (Bill of Rights)#Amendment II
- Second Amendment to the United States Constitution
