= Firearm Owner's Identification =

Permit for firearm possession for Illinois residents

Illinois State Legislature
- Full name: Firearm Owners Identification Card Act
- Website: 430 ILCS 65

Status: Current legislation

In the U.S. state of Illinois, residents must possess a FOID card, or Firearm Owners Identification card, in order to legally possess or purchase firearms or ammunition. The applicable law has been in effect since 1968, but has been subject to several subsequent amendments.

== Background ==
The FOID card is issued by the Illinois State Police, with the application being submitted either online or via a paper application process. Police first perform a check of the applicant on the National Instant Criminal Background Check System (NICS), an electronic database maintained by the FBI. Grounds for disqualification include a conviction for a felony or for an act of domestic violence, a conviction for assault or battery within the last five years, or being the subject of an order of protection. The police also check an Illinois Department of Human Services database, to disqualify any applicant who has been adjudicated as a mental defective, or who has been a patient of a mental institution within the last five years. Mental health professionals are required to inform state authorities about patients who display violent, suicidal or threatening behavior, for inclusion in the Human Services database. The police may also check other sources of information. There are additional requirements for applicants under the age of 21.

A FOID card legally must be granted within 30 days from the date the application is received, unless the applicant does not qualify. However, by January 2006, the backlog had increased and the State Police were taking as long as 50 days, in violation of the law, to issue or deny the FOID. By March 2013 the delay was often at least 60 days. By March 2020 this had increased to more than 90 days. Cards issued on or after June 1, 2008 are valid for ten years; cards issued prior to June 1, 2008 were valid for five years. The FOID card will be revoked before its expiration if the individual becomes disqualified as described above. State statute allows for a $10 application fee; however, the total amount charged is $11 when a $1 service fee, which cannot be waived, is included.

Illinois law requires that, when a firearm is sold by a Federal Firearms License (FFL) holder, or in any private sale, the seller perform a dial-up inquiry to the State Police to verify that the buyer's FOID card is valid. This additional check is known as the Firearm Transfer Inquiry Program (FTIP). At the time of the inquiry, the police perform an automated search of several criminal and mental health databases, including the federal NICS database. (Generally, FFLs in all states must request a background check through the NICS before selling a firearm; however in some states non-FFL purchasers who possess certain state-issued firearms permits, e.g., a permit to carry a concealed handgun, may purchase firearms from FFLs without undergoing a point-of-sale NICS check.) For private sales not at a gun show, the seller must also verify the buyer's FOID card with the state police, and receive a transfer approval number, either via a web site or with a phone call.

== Rulings ==
In 2011, in the case of People v. Holmes, the Illinois Supreme Court ruled that non-Illinois residents who are permitted to possess a firearm in their home state are not required to have an Illinois FOID card when in possession of firearms or ammunition in Illinois.

On February 14, 2018, in a ruling on the case of People v. Brown that applies only to the defendant, a circuit court in Illinois found that the requirement to obtain a FOID in order to acquire or possess a firearm is unconstitutional. The court ruled that "to require the defendant to fill out a form, provide a picture ID and pay a $10 fee to obtain a FOID card before she can exercise her constitutional right to self-defense with a firearm is a violation of the Second Amendment... and a violation of Article I, Section 22, of the Constitution of the State of Illinois." After the state requested reconsideration, the court ruled on October 16, 2018 that, in addition to reaffirming its previous ruling, the requirement to physically possess a FOID while in possession of a firearm is also unconstitutional. The case was appealed to the Illinois Supreme Court. On April 2, 2020, the court remanded the lower court's ruling. On April 27, 2021, White County Resident Judge T. Scott Webb once again ruled the FOID unconstitutional, saying, "A citizen in the State of Illinois is not born with a Second Amendment right. Nor does that right insure when a citizen turns 18 or 21 years of age, it is a façade. They only gain that right if they pay a $10 fee, complete the proper application, and submit a photograph. If the right to bear arms and self-defense are truly core rights, there should be no burden on the citizenry to enjoy those rights, especially within the confines and privacy of their own homes." The state appealed this decision to the Illinois Supreme Court, which ruled on June 16, 2022 that the circuit court had not followed its instructions in the 2020 ruling, again remanding the case to the lower court without ruling on the constitutionality of the law. On February 11, 2025, the circuit court ruled FOID unconstitutional a 3rd time.

On July 18, 2023, in the case of Guns Save Life v. Kelly, a Sangamon County circuit court judge ruled that the state's FOID requirement is constitutional. Judge Jennie Ascher stated that the $10 fee is reasonable for people to pay for a FOID card. She wrote in her opinion, "There is ample historical evidence supporting the constitutionality of the FOID Act, and GSL's facial challenge fails as the historical record demonstrates that laws 'relevantly similar' to the FOID Act have been part of American legal history from the Founding Era to present day."

== See also ==
- Gun laws in Illinois
