= History of concealed carry in the United States =

Historical aspect of American gun law

History of concealed carry laws

The history of concealed carry in the United States is the history of public opinion, policy, and law regarding the practice of carrying concealed firearms, especially handguns.

== Background ==
The Second Amendment to the United States Constitution states "A well regulated Militia, being necessary to the security of a free State, the right of the people to keep and bear Arms, shall not be infringed." Although the Supreme Court first held the Second Amendment protects an individual right to keep and bear arms in Dredd Scott v. Sandford, 60 U.S. 393, 417 (1857), it struck down a gun control law on Second Amendment grounds for the first time in District of Columbia v. Heller (2008), ruling that the Second Amendment protects a responsible, law-abiding individual's right to keep handguns in the home for self-defense. On June 23, 2022, in New York State Pistol & Rifle Assoc. v. Bruen, the Court confirmed the Second Amendment protects the right to carry firearms in public for self-defense. The Court struck down a requirement in New York's public carry law that required an applicant to have "proper cause" to carry outside the home, separate from a general desire for self-defense. The Court did not invalidate any of the other provisions of New York's law requiring people who carry guns in public to obtain a permit. In fact, Justice Kavanaugh stated in his concurrence that, "[g]oing forward, therefore, the 43 States that employ objective shall-issue licensing regimes for carrying handguns for self-defense may continue to do so. Likewise, the 6 States including New York potentially affected by today’s decision may continue to require licenses for carrying handguns for self-defense so long as those States employ objective licensing requirements like those used by the 43 shall-issue States." In Bruen, the Court referred to the 25 states that have repealed their laws requiring permits to carry in public as "permitless carry" states.

Research into the effects of shall-issue concealed carry laws has rendered mixed results. A meta-analysis conducted by the RAND Corporation of over 30 studies up to 2019 concluded, "the best available studies provide inconclusive evidence for the effect of shall-issue laws" on total homicides, firearm homicides, robberies, assaults, and rapes, and that "there is limited evidence that shall-issue laws may increase violent crime".

A study of states that adopted permitless concealed carry laws found that such states experienced a 13% increase in fatal and nonfatal police shootings of civilians compared to what would have been expected had stronger carrying standards remained in place. People who carried firearms at least once in the past month were three times more likely to have had a firearm stolen than other gun owners.

Whether the intent of the Second Amendment was to recognize an individual right to own and carry arms, or to guarantee the right of each of the several States to have a militia composed of citizens (i.e. the organized, and unorganized militia, as defined by the Efficiency In Militia Act of 1903) remains an issue of public debate. However, the constitutions of 32 states expressly protect an individual right to keep and bear arms (Alabama, Alaska, Arizona, Colorado, Connecticut, Delaware, Florida, Illinois, Indiana, Kentucky, Louisiana, Maine, Michigan, Mississippi, Missouri, Montana, Nebraska, Nevada, New Hampshire, New Mexico, North Dakota, Oklahoma, Oregon, Pennsylvania, South Dakota, Texas, Utah, Vermont, Virginia, Washington, West Virginia, and Wyoming). Case law in 9 other states (Arkansas, Georgia, Idaho, North Carolina, Ohio, Rhode Island, South Carolina, Tennessee, and Wisconsin) protects the individual right, making a total of 41 states that expressly protect an individual right to keep and bear arms.

== Early bans ==
The constitutions of Kentucky (1850), Louisiana (1879), Mississippi (1890) and Idaho (1978) permitted their respective Legislatures to regulate or prohibit concealed carry while respecting the right to open carry without a permit. This is because concealing weapons used to be thought of as a practice done exclusively by criminals.

=== Vermont ===
The state of Vermont is a notable exception to the trend in concealed carry laws. According to its Constitution, it is forbidden from regulating the carrying of firearms, either open or concealed. For this reason, Vermont is the first state to have constitutional carry, also known as "permitless carry" or "Vermont carry". However, Vermont's refusal to touch the subject of concealed carry regulation leaves its citizens without the ability to acquire a concealed carry permit in their home state. This causes problems for Vermonters traveling to states that recognize only resident carry permits, and for Vermonters who would apply for nonresident permits in states that require proof of a resident concealed carry permit before they will consider issuing a nonresident permit. This could theoretically also cause problems under the Gun-Free School Zones Act of 1990, which through its 1000-foot radius provision, makes unlicensed carrying of firearms illegal under Federal law in nearly every part of any city or town, although in practice this Act is rarely (if ever) enforced against persons who are not either on school property or committing some other crime. For these reasons, every other state to adopt constitutional carry has kept its previously existing permitting process in place.

== Reconstruction and discrimination ==
During Reconstruction, several states, especially Southern states, passed laws banning concealed carry. These laws were often aimed at disarming African-Americans, and though they did not explicitly say so because of the 14th Amendment, were not to be enforced against whites.

Rivers H. Buford, associate justice of the Florida Supreme Court, said that the Florida law banning concealed carry, "[t]he original Act of 1893 ... was passed for the purpose of disarming the negro laborers ... and to give the white citizens in sparsely settled areas a better feeling of security. The statute was never intended to be applied to the white population and in practice has never been so applied. ... [I]t is a safe guess to assume that more than 80% of the white men living in the rural sections of Florida have violated this statute. It is also a safe guess to say that not more than 5% of the men in Florida who own pistols and repeating rifles have ever applied to the Board of County Commissioners for a permit to have the same in their possession and there has never been, within my knowledge, any effort to enforce the provisions of this statute as to white people, because it has been generally conceded to be in contravention to the Constitution and non-enforceable if contested."

In fact, Florida was not the only such state to ban the carriage of arms by blacks, nor was it the most explicit. The 1834 Tennessee Constitution, 1836 Arkansas Constitution, as well as the 1838 Florida constitution, stated "That the free white men of this State shall have a right to keep and to bear arms for their common defence."

== Early 20th century ==
The State of New York passed the Sullivan Act in 1911 that required a license to possess a concealed firearm.

== Concealed carry licensing wave: 1976-1996 ==
The modern wave of concealed carry legislation and licensing perhaps had its start in 1976 in Georgia. The Georgia Legislature passed a bill introduced by Lieutenant Governor Zell Miller, which became the model for later laws. His effort was inspired by an NRA director and former border patrolman, Ed Topmiller. The heart of the law was that the job of administering the shall-issue permit process was given to a non-law enforcement, elected official, the Probate Court Judge.

The trend for shall-issue laws began in Washington in 1961, Indiana in 1980, Maine and North Dakota followed in 1985, and South Dakota in 1986.

In 1987, Florida went from may-issue to shall-issue.

In 1989, four states became shall-issue: Georgia, Oregon, Pennsylvania, and West Virginia went from may-issue to shall issue. Tennessee went from no-issue to may-issue.

In 1990, two states became shall-issue, Idaho and Mississippi. Idaho had been may-issue, Mississippi had been no-issue.

In 1991, Montana became shall-issue, going from may-issue to shall-issue.

In 1994, four states became shall-issue: Alaska, Arizona, Tennessee, and Colorado. Tennessee had been may-issue since 1989; Colorado was also may-issue. Alaska and Arizona had not previously issued permits.

In 1995, seven states became shall-issue: Nevada, Utah, and Virginia had previously been may-issue, whereas Texas, Arkansas, Oklahoma and North Carolina had previously been no-issue.

In 1996, three more states became shall-issue: Louisiana, South Carolina and Kentucky. Of these, Kentucky had been no-issue, whereas South Carolina and Louisiana had been may-issue. This brought the entire Deep South to having shall-issue licensing regimes, and increased the number of shall-issue states to 30. Only 7 states remained no-issue under state law.

== Second concealed licensing wave and the beginnings of constitutional carry ==
In 2001, Michigan became shall-issue. It had previously been may-issue.

In 2003, Alaska repealed its law restricting concealed carry of firearms, becoming the second state where concealed carry is unrestricted. Unlike Vermont, it kept its licensing scheme in place so that residents could apply for permits for reciprocity purposes with states that require a residential carry permit. Concealed carrying of firearms remained illegal for anyone prohibited from possessing firearms under federal or state law, but any non-prohibited person no longer required a permit to carry a firearm.

Also in 2003, four more states became shall-issue: Minnesota and Colorado had been may-issue, and Missouri and New Mexico which had been no-issue.

In 2004, Ohio became shall-issue. It previously had been no-issue.

In 2006, two states became shall-issue: Kansas and Nebraska. These both had previously been no-issue; this left Wisconsin and Illinois as the only two no-issue states. 37 states were shall-issue, 2 were unrestricted, and 9 were may-issue.

== Heller and the constitutional carry wave: 2008 to present ==
In 2008, the Supreme Court of the United States decided District of Columbia v. Heller, the first time it had struck down a gun law on Second Amendment grounds. The case did not directly concern laws restricting the carry of firearms outside the home. From that point on, more states adopted constitutional carry policies which is to allow both open and concealed carry without a permit, and the last no-issue holdouts gave way.

In 2010, Arizona became the third state after Alaska and Vermont (and the first with a significant urban population) to allow constitutional carry.

In 2011, Wyoming became the fourth constitutional carry state. Wisconsin was the 49th state to legally abandon a no-issue policy, adopting instead a shall-issue policy. (Other states remained no-issue in practice, but not in law.) That same year, Iowa changed its may-issue policy to become shall-issue.

In 2013, Arkansas became an ambiguously constitutional carry state, a position that was further solidified with a precedent set in 2018 in Taff v. State of Arkansas. This case considered a person suspected of stealing from a convenience store who, upon interview, was found to be carrying a concealed firearm and charged with carrying unlawfully. The charge was dismissed, as the defendant had not used the firearm unlawfully, nor had demonstrated intent to do so. The court held that simply carrying a concealed or open carried firearm by a person not otherwise prohibited is not a criminal act.

2013 also marked the last of the 50 states to abandon a no-issue policy when Illinois, after the 2012 Moore v. Madigan case challenging the total ban of concealed carry within the state was decided in favor of the plaintiffs, adopted a shall-issue licensing policy within the timeline established by the Court. While Hawaii has a permit process in place within the law, they do not routinely offer permits, and are described as "non-issue" by local firearm advocates.

In 2015, two states adopted constitutional carry: Maine and Kansas.

In 2016, four states adopted constitutional carry: Idaho, Mississippi, Missouri and West Virginia.

In 2017, two states adopted constitutional carry: North Dakota (concealed carry only and residents only, open carry and non-residents still require a permit) and New Hampshire.

In 2019, three states adopted constitutional carry: South Dakota, Kentucky and Oklahoma.

In 2021, five states adopted constitutional carry: Montana, Utah, Iowa, Tennessee and Texas.

In 2022, three states adopted constitutional carry: Ohio, Georgia, and Indiana; Alabama enacted legislation to allow it beginning January 1, 2023.

== Bruen and the unconstitutionality of may-issue permitting ==
In April 2021, the U.S. Supreme Court granted a writ of certiorari regarding New York's strict concealed carry permitting laws brought forth by the New York State Rifle & Pistol Association. On June 23, 2022, the U.S. Supreme Court ruled in the landmark case New York State Rifle & Pistol Association, Inc. v. Bruen that "The Second and Fourteenth Amendments protect an individual's right to carry a handgun for self-defense outside the home", thereby striking down New York's may-issue law and making New York, California, Hawaii, Maryland, New Jersey, and Massachusetts de jure shall-issue jurisdictions. However, there remain inconsistencies in how much certain state and local governments are complying with the Supreme Court ruling and whether ordinary citizens can de facto obtain permits in previously may-issue jurisdictions.

== Unsettled issues ==
Rhode Island has a hybrid permitting process where an applicant for a carry license can either apply through the local authorities of any city or town on a shall-issue basis, or through the Attorney General's office, which issues permits on a may-issue basis. After the Bruen ruling, Rhode Island Attorney General Peter Neronha issued a statement saying that because the local authorities issue permits on a shall-issue basis, Rhode Island meets the requirements set fourth in Bruen and therefore his office can continue issuing permits on a may-issue basis. This has caused controversy since only the Attorney General's carry permit gives permission to open carry handguns while the locally issued permits only refer to concealed carry.

== See also ==
- Concealed carry
- American gun ownership
- Gun politics in the United States
- Gun violence in the United States
