= Gun laws in New York =

Location of New York in the United States

Gun laws in New York regulate the sale, possession, and use of firearms and ammunition in the U.S. state of New York, outside of New York City which has separate licensing regulations. New York's gun laws are among the most restrictive in the United States.

New York Civil Rights Law art. II, § 4 provides that "A well regulated militia being necessary to the security of a free state, the right of the people to keep and bear arms cannot be infringed."

New York state law does not require a license to own or possess shotguns or manually operated action rifles, but does require a permit to legally possess or own a pistol. A permit is also needed to purchase all semi-automatic rifles, but not to possess them. All firearms must comply with the NY SAFE Act, which bans firearms that it defines as assault weapons, unless they were owned prior to the ban and registered by April 15, 2014. Law enforcement is partially exempt from this law.

New York City has its own set of laws and requires a license to own any firearm.

The U.S. Supreme Court in the case District of Columbia v. Heller, 554 U.S. 570 (2008), ruled that "the right to bear arms" is an individual right and a right to arms in common use are protected under the Second Amendment to the United States Constitution. The Court further ruled that this right applies against the states in McDonald v. Chicago, 561 U.S. 742 (2010).

In 2013, the Second Circuit asked the New York Court of Appeals whether part-time state residents are eligible for a pistol permit under New York law, to which the Court answered in the affirmative.

On June 5, 2022, Governor Kathy Hochul (D‑NY) signed New York Assembly Bill A10503 into effect. The bill raises the minimum age to purchase a semi-automatic rifle to 21, and requires a license for all new semi-automatic rifle purchases. Semi-automatic rifles owned prior to this date are grandfathered. This bill was passed in response to the 2022 Buffalo shooting, and the Robb Elementary school shooting.

In a 2012 ruling, the United States Court of Appeals for the Second Circuit upheld New York's law requiring gun owners who seek a concealed weapon permit to prove a special need for protection; the decision in Kachalsky v. County of Westchester, 701 F.3d 81, held that New York's laws do not violate the right to keep and bear arms. This decision was abrogated on June 23, 2022 when the U.S. Supreme Court ruled in the case of New York State Rifle & Pistol Association, Inc. v. Bruen that the state's requirement for concealed carry permit applicants to show "proper cause" (the "may-issue" policy) is unconstitutional.

== Overview ==
Most of New York State's gun laws are covered in two sections of New York Penal Law: Article 265 - Firearms and Other Dangerous Weapons, and Article 400 - Licensing and Other Provisions Relating to Firearms. These laws ban handgun possession and provide exemptions, including individuals licensed to carry handguns or to possess them for other reasons, including sports, repair, or disposal. New York's gun laws also apply to other items regarded as deadly weapons, such as certain chemical sprays, clubs, explosives, fireworks, knives, rockets, slingshots, stun guns, and throwing stars. A previous ban on stun guns was ruled unconstitutional.

Statewide, New York enforces various firearm related prohibitions, many proscriptions similarly listed in the now-expired Federal Assault Weapons Ban. On January 15, 2013, the state assault weapons ban was made more restrictive by the NY SAFE Act. Specified rifle magazines are banned: a) manufactured after 1994; and b) the magazine holds in excess of 10 rounds (handguns included). In December 2013, a federal judge ruled the seven-round magazine limitation is "'tenuous, straitened, and unsupported', and therefore unconstitutional." Any semi-automatic rifle (with a detachable magazine) or shotgun (non-pump) with one or more of these features are banned: 1) pistol grip; 2) bayonet lug; 3) telescoping or folding stock; 4) flash suppressor; 5) threaded barrel; or 6) grenade launcher. The SAFE Act expanded the ban to add the following features: 7) muzzle brake (Dec 2014 Federal court All references to muzzle "break [sic]" be stricken); 8) muzzle compensator; 9) thumbhole stock; and 10) foregrip. All semi-automatic versions of assault-style rifles and shotguns purchased prior to January 15, 2013 are grandfathered, but must be registered within one year of the SAFE Act passage.

Permits issued in New York are valid statewide, except in NYC, unless validated by the NYC police commissioner. A NYC concealed carry license is valid throughout the state. NY Penal Code 400 (6).

New York has enacted a red flag law, prohibits teachers from being armed, banned bump stocks, instituted a 30-day waiting period for purchasers who don't pass the background check instantly, and operates a gun buyback program.

== Summary table ==
Subject / law	Long guns	Handguns	Relevant statutes	Notes
State permit required to purchase?	Partial	Yes	S 265.20, S 265.01	Handguns and semi-automatic rifles require a permit. Permits are issued by County or State Supreme Court judges/justices outside of New York City, Westchester, Nassau and Suffolk Counties, with a background check. Permits for those wanting to carry concealed or possess handguns in the home are issued on a "shall-issue" basis. No NYS permit is required for shotguns and non-semiautomatic rifles. Firearms defined as assault weapons cannot be bought. NOTE: Different laws apply for NYC
Firearm registration?	No	Yes	S 700.00, S 265.01	Handguns: All handguns must be registered under a license. There is a $3 registration fee. Handguns are registered with purchase permit. The serial number and sale is noted down. Antique weapons are exempted from this. All handguns must travel in the manner one's license is issued. No record is needed of previously owned handguns with law enforcement. Non-assault weapon long guns: No registration required. Assault weapons: All rifles classified as assault weapons were required to be registered with the state by January 15, 2014, and are illegal otherwise. NOTE: Different laws apply for NYC
Owner license required?	No	Yes	S 265.20, S 265.01	No license is required for long guns; however, New York State requires a license for handgun ownership. Handgun licenses are normally restricted to three types: residence or business premises permit, Target & Hunting, and Unrestricted Carry. Target and hunting allows carry while engaged in those activities. Unrestricted allows carry at any time. All permits issued outside of New York City are not valid in New York City except for retired police and federal law enforcement officers with that status marked on their permit and for armored car guards on duty. The minimum age to be issued a handgun license is 21 unless one is a former or current member of the armed forces or law enforcement. NOTE: Different laws apply for NYC
License required for concealed carry?	N/A	Yes	S 400.00	New York counties, or the police departments in New York City and Nassau and Suffolk counties, issue unrestricted concealed carry licenses on a "shall issue" basis. Prior to June 23, 2022, licenses were issued on a "may issue" basis, but this practice was held unconstitutional by the Supreme Court. Previously, discretionary issuance policies varied widely across the state. It is not a crime to carry a weapon under a Target or Hunting permit for other purposes, but if caught or reported, the permit will likely be revoked. Concealed carry without any kind of permit is a felony unless the weapon is unloaded and no ammunition for it is in possession of the person carrying. All permits are valid throughout the state, except in New York City, unless validated by the police commissioner of that city, or by armored car guards, retired police officers and retired federal law enforcement officers as specified in the Criminal Procedure Law. NY Penal Law 400(6). While New York law does not allow issuance of pistol licenses to non-residents, 2013 federal appeals court and State appeals court rulings clarified the residency requirement. This clarification allowed those domiciled outside of the state with a part-time residence in New York to be issued a permit.
Open carry allowed?	No	No	S 265.35, S 265.01	Open carry in public is not legal in most instances. While no law specifically bans open carry, a license to carry is issued to carry concealed as per penal law 400. Therefore, pistol permit holders must carry concealed. Open carry is permitted while hunting and possibly on one's own property. Open carry of unloaded long guns is not explicitly prohibited by any law, but is generally not practiced. It is illegal to transport a loaded long gun in a motor vehicle, except in some scenarios while hunting.
Assault weapon law?	Yes	Yes	S 265.00, S 265.02	Possession of assault weapons is prohibited, except for those legally possessed on January 15, 2013 and registered with the state by January 15, 2014 or classified as an antique assault weapon. New York City, Buffalo, Albany, and Rochester have enacted their own assault weapon bans. Law enforcement and retired law enforcement are exempt from the assault weapons ban.
Magazine capacity restriction?	Yes	Yes	§ 265.02	Magazine size is limited to 10 rounds. Law enforcement and retired law enforcement with last service weapon only, are exempt from the 10 round limit. Also exempt are antique high-quality magazines if registered to an associated antique assault weapon. The 10 round magazine law is part of the NY SAFE Act. A legal provision that mandated no more than 7 rounds that may be loaded into the magazine was struck down by a federal judge on December 31, 2013. NOTE: Different laws apply for NYC
Title II (National Firearms Act) weapons restricted?	Yes	Yes	S 265.02, S 265.02	Ownership of machine guns, suppressors, short-barreled rifles, AOW's and short-barreled shotguns are prohibited to the average citizen. Destructive devices are permitted except for rockets with greater than 3 ounces of propellant. AOW's disguised as non-firearms are illegal.
Castle Doctrine Law?	Yes*	Yes*	§ 35.20	New York's castle doctrine law permits the use of non-deadly physical force to stop the commission of "a crime involving damage to premises". Deadly force may be used to stop the commission of arson if someone "reasonably believes" it to be necessary. Deadly force is also permitted to be used by someone who is "in possession or control of [a] premises, or a person licensed or privileged to be thereon or therein" to stop the commission of burglary, if they reasonably believe it to be necessary.
State preemption of local restrictions?	No	No	None	New York preempts only handgun licensing. Places such as Buffalo, Rochester, Albany, and New York City have put in more restrictive gun laws, such as licensing of long guns and 5-round magazine limits.
Peaceable journey laws?	Yes	Yes	S 265.10	With certain restrictions (see below), most notably magazines are not exempt.
Background checks required for private sales?	Yes	Yes	NY Gen Bus L § 898 (2012)	For firearm transfers between private parties, a licensed dealer must conduct a background check, provide documentation of the check to the New York State Police, and keep a record of the transaction.
Red flag law?	Yes	Yes		Family members, school officials or law enforcement can ask courts to temporarily block someone from buying or owning a gun.
Minimum age to purchase or possess?	Yes	No		The minimum age to purchase a semiautomatic rifle is 21. (Under federal law the minimum age to purchase a handgun is 21.)

== Handgun licensing ==
=== Overview ===
The purchase of a handgun in New York is limited to only those individuals who hold a valid pistol permit issued by a county or major city within New York, and present to the seller a purchase document issued by the licensing authority, with the specific make, model, caliber, and serial number of the handgun indicated on the document. The possession of a handgun in New York is limited only to those individuals who hold a valid pistol license and are in possession of a registered handgun (one that appears on the license, indicating the specific make, model, caliber, and serial number of the handgun). The carry of a handgun in New York is limited only to those individuals who hold a valid pistol license, possess a registered handgun, and are carrying said handgun in compliance with the restrictions as they appear on the license and other applicable state and federal law.

New York State Pistol Permits are not issued to out-of-state residents, although New York will issue pistol licenses to part-time residents. New York does not honor licenses or permits from any other states, although some states will recognize New York licenses without a formal agreement.

=== Application ===
Application for a handgun license is made through an individual's county or major city of primary residence, usually the police or sheriff's department, or a separate licensing authority. In NYC, the licensing authority is the police commissioner. In Nassau and Suffolk counties on Long Island, the licensing officer is the county police commissioner or county sheriff, depending on where one resides. The licensing authority is a county court judge, or more rarely, a supreme court judge. State and FBI criminal records, along with state mental health records, are checked as part of the licensing process. In addition, applicants are required to supply four personal references from individuals unrelated to them by blood or marriage. These individuals may be required to fill out forms, varying in length by county, attesting to the applicant's "good character". The law allows licensing authorities up to six months to process a license.

=== Types of licenses and restrictions ===
Three types of pistol permits can be issued: possess on premises, a restricted permit limited to target and hunting only, and unrestricted concealed carry. Concealed carry permits may be restricted, but restrictions do not have the force of law. Permits issued outside of NYC are not valid in NYC unless a special license is issued granting validity. On February 5, 2024, a lawsuit challenging New York's laws that ban non-residents from bringing and publicly carrying firearms in the state was filed.

In addition to laws pertaining to the entire state, there are additional laws and statutes pertaining to licensing and permits in some of the major cities of the state. However, NYC is the only place where an individual holding a valid New York State firearm license, obtained outside of NYC, who is traveling through NYC with a firearm must make no stops and must keep the firearm and ammo in separate locked containers that are not immediately accessible by the driver or any passengers during travel.

In New York State, pistol licenses are generally of two types: carry or premises-only. "Premises-only" is the most common license issued in NYC and is "shall-issue." Restrictions can be placed on either of the above types of licenses; for example, many jurisdictions allow handgun license holders to carry handguns only while hunting (i.e., sportsman's license) and/or traveling to and from the range (i.e., target license).

== Assault weapons ==
State law defines an assault weapon as:

- Semi-automatic rifles able to accept detachable magazines and one or more of the following:
  - Folding or telescoping stock
  - A pistol grip that protrudes conspicuously beneath the action of the weapon
  - A thumbhole stock
  - A second handgrip or a protruding grip that can be held by the non-trigger hand
  - A bayonet mount
  - A flash suppressor, muzzle brake, muzzle compensator, or threaded barrel designed to accommodate one
  - A grenade launcher

- Semi-automatic pistols with detachable magazines and one or more of the following:
  - Magazine that attaches outside the pistol grip
  - Threaded barrel to attach barrel extender, flash suppressor, handgrip, or suppressor
  - Barrel shroud that can be used as a handhold
  - Unloaded weight of 50 oz (1.4 kg) or more
  - A semi-automatic version of a fully automatic firearm
  - A folding, telescoping or thumbhole stock

- Semi-automatic shotguns with one or more of the following:
  - Folding or telescoping stock
  - Thumbhole stock
  - A second handgrip or a protruding grip that can be held by the non-trigger hand
  - A fixed magazine capacity in excess of 7 rounds
  - The ability to accept a detachable magazine

=== Magazines ===
In general, magazines are required to have a maximum capacity of 10 rounds.

A "large capacity ammunition feeding device" is any belt, drum, strip, magazine, or similar instrument used to feed ammunition into a firearm that has a capability of holding more than ten rounds.

=== Exceptions ===
For the purposes of this section, "large capacity ammunition feeding devices" manufactured at least 50 years prior to the current date will be referred to as "antique magazines". Magazines that are not legally limited to 10 rounds and were manufactured at any point in time will be referred to as "standard capacity magazines".

A firearm is considered "antique" if it was manufactured at least 50 years prior to the current date. Antique firearms can still be continued to be purchased and sold so long as one registers them after purchasing them, even if they would be considered assault weapons otherwise. This transfer exemption also applies to antique magazines, although these must be specifically registered to the antique firearm.

Police officers who are residents of the state may still own assault weapons and standard capacity magazines. Retired police officers may also own assault weapons and standard capacity magazines if they acquired them during the course of their career, due to a carve-out in the amended SAFE Act.

Federally licensed firearms dealers that are licensed as a dealer or gunsmith under New York law may continue to possess assault weapons and standard capacity magazines.

Military members stationed within the state may still bring assault weapons and standard capacity magazines into the state, provided the military member has approval from their command.

== New York City ==
Subject/Law	Long guns	Handguns	Relevant statutes	Notes
Permit to purchase?	Yes	Yes	§ 1-03, § 1-04, § 2-03, § 5-01, § 5-25	Valid pistol licenses and rifle/shotgun permits are prerequisite to the purchase of handguns and long guns respectively. A separate "Handgun Purchase Authorization", valid for 30 days from issuance, is required to purchase a handgun from a dealer, and one may not purchase a handgun more than once every 90 days. One may not purchase a rifle or shotgun more than once every 90 days. Upon purchase of a 5th handgun, residents must show evidence of possession of a gun safe for storage of firearms.
Firearm registration?	Yes	Yes	§ 1-03, § 1-04, § 2-03	Registration is required for all firearms possessed within the city.
Owner license required?	Yes	Yes	§ 1-03, § 1-04, § 2-03, § 5-01, § 10-306	Owner licenses are required for all firearms and ammunition. Shotgun/rifle ammunition and magazines may only be legally possessed for shotguns/rifles the owner has registered.
Carry permits required?	Yes	Yes	§ 5-01, § 5-03, § 5-04	Carry permits are granted on a "shall-issue" basis. State permits (without an NYC endorsement) and out-of-state permits are not valid for concealed carry in NYC. Individuals may transport a firearm through the city to and from locations outside of the city without a permit. The firearm must be unloaded and the journey through the city must be continuous and uninterrupted.
Assault weapon law?	Yes	Yes	§ 10-301	More restrictive version of New York State's laws, with a 5-round magazine limit for long guns and 10 for handguns. The city police commissioner may also define certain semi-automatic firearm models as "assault weapons" if they determine that those firearms are "particularly suitable for military and not sporting purposes". An example of a commissioner-designated assault weapon is the AR-15 (the Ares/FightLite SCR, which is generally compatible with AR-15 upper receivers, is specifically allowed, however).
NFA weapons restricted?	Yes	Yes	§ 10-301	NFA items may only be purchased/possessed by active law enforcement personnel, as defined by Penal Law.
Peaceable journey laws?	Yes	Yes	§ 10-305 i. (1), 38 RCNY § 16-02 (a)	Non-residents may transit the city with a legally owned firearm without a permit, provided the weapon is unloaded and the person leaves the city within 24 hours. However, there have been instances of lawful firearm owners being arrested by police for transporting weapons through NYC airports and then being forced to reference the federal Firearm Owners Protection Act as an affirmative defense to charges of Unlawful Possession of a Weapon.
Firearm color	Yes	Yes	§ 10-131	Unlawful for any person to possess a "deceptively colored firearm, rifle, shotgun, or assault weapon", defined as any firearm, rifle, shotgun, or assault weapon where a "substantial portion of [the] exterior surface is colored any color other than black, dark grey, dark green, silver, steel, or nickel", except if "its handle is composed of ivory, colored so as to appear to be composed of ivory, composed of wood, or colored so as to be composed of wood." Violation is "a misdemeanor punishable by a fine of not more than one thousand dollars or imprisonment of not more than one year or both." Does not apply to government agencies.

=== Licensing ===
Residents of NYC who wish to obtain a firearms license must apply online through the New York Police Department License Division.

There are currently eight types of pistol licenses: Carry Guard, Concealed Carry, Gun Custodian, Premises Business, Premises Residence, Retiree, Special Carry, and Special Patrolman.

In order to carry a firearm in public, applicants must apply for a carry license, as premises licensees may only transport their firearms unloaded and in a locked case. Prior to Bruen, concealed-carry licenses were nearly impossible for a resident with average self-defense needs to procure as the City required a showing of extraordinary personal danger.

There is also a rifle/shotgun permit, issued for the purchase and possession of rifles and shotguns.

=== Transport ===
In response to the Supreme Court granting certiorari in New York State Rifle & Pistol Association, Inc. v. City of New York, and in an attempt to prevent a Supreme Court decision, state law was amended to allow transporting the handgun to and from a target range, home, business, or any other place one is authorized to possess such handgun, but the firearm must be unloaded and in a locked container. Previously in NYC, firearms could only be transported directly to and from a range within city limits. Traveling through NYC with a license issued from another jurisdiction within the state must be done in accordance with local law.

A person carrying a firearm without a valid permit in NYC may be charged with "criminal possession of a weapon in the second degree," a felony. Unlawfully carrying a firearm in NYC is typically punishable by a prison term of 3 1/2 years. A high-profile example of the penalties associated with New York's restrictive gun laws is the 2-year prison sentence served by former New York Giants wide receiver Plaxico Burress, after pleading guilty to unlawful possession of a weapon, stemming from negligently shooting himself in the leg at an NYC nightclub with his concealed handgun, for which he did not have a valid NYC concealed carry permit. At the time of the incident, Burress had a Florida concealed carry license, which is not valid in New York.

=== Miscellaneous ===
In November 2012, then-mayor Michael Bloomberg denied a request by the New York National Guard for its members to carry service weapons to help maintain order in devastated parts of the city in the aftermath of Hurricane Sandy, calling the presence of armed service members in Brooklyn "a bad idea," and further stating, "The NYPD is the only people we want on the street with guns."

In 2021, the state's gun laws were challenged in New York State Rifle & Pistol Association, Inc. v. Bruen, claiming the laws infringe on their Second Amendment rights. The Supreme Court ruled in favor of the association, affirming the rights of New Yorkers to obtain a carry license without first having to demonstrate a special need for one.

City ordinances and New York's state laws also require medical facilities to notify the police within a specified period of time after admitting anyone with gunshot wounds. Hospitals or clinics that fail to comply with this requirement face fines and other penalties.

== Rifles and shotguns, antique handguns ==
Prior to January 15, 2013, rifles deemed assault-style did not have to be registered in any jurisdiction within New York except for NYC. Since enactment of the NY SAFE Act, all grandfathered operable assault-style rifles purchased prior to January 15, 2013 must now be registered. The deadline to register these firearms was on or before January 14, 2014.

Contrary to handguns, N.Y. state law does not ban the open carry of shotguns or rifles, except in restricted buildings such as schools and courthouses.

=== New York City ===
NYC has additional restrictions, such as requiring rifle/shotgun magazines to have a maximum capacity of five rounds.

Antiques and replica handguns must be registered to be legally loaded and fired.

== Non-resident travel throughout the state ==
State law provides restricted exceptions for interstate transportation of firearms by non-residents. Non-residents may transport any lawful firearm through the state to any place outside of it where an individual may lawfully possess and carry such firearm.

The firearm must be unloaded while in transit within the state. The firearm and any ammunition for it must not be easily accessible by anyone in the vehicle's driver or passenger area. For example, the gun and ammunition must be kept in the storage area of the vehicle, such as a car's "trunk." In vehicles without a storage area separate from the driver or passenger compartment, the firearm or ammunition shall be contained in a locked container other than the glove compartment or console." One may also transport a firearm for target competition purposes, "by a person who is a member or coach of an accredited college or university target pistol team" and "while attending or traveling to or from, an organized competitive pistol match or league competition under auspices of, or approved by, the National Rifle Association and in which [they are] a competitor, within 48 hours of such event or by a person who is a non-resident of the state while attending or traveling to or from an organized match sanctioned by the International Handgun Metallic Silhouette Association and in which he is a competitor, within 48 hours of such event."

== Federal protections ==
The state of New York is of particular concern to interstate motorists who travel with firearms because it separates all six New England states from the rest of the United States. This means that under the Firearm Owners Protection Act (FOPA), all people traveling through the state with firearms are protected by federal law, however they must have their firearms unloaded and locked in a hard case where they are not readily accessible (e.g. in the trunk of a vehicle).

A New York Court of Appeals decision in 2019 stated that an out-of-state gun dealer cannot be prosecuted in New York for selling a gun that was later resold into the black market.

== Miscellaneous laws ==
Gun shows: New York requires anyone who buys a gun at a gun show to pass a background check.

Youth and firearms: Youths between ages 14 and 21 may shoot a handgun at a range only if they are under the supervision of a military officer or licensed professional, have not been convicted of a felony, and do not seem to be a danger to themselves or others. Youths between 12 and 15 may only possess to load or fire a firearm when supervised by an adult with specific qualifications. Children under the age of 12 are not permitted to possess a firearm with the intention to load or fire it.

In New York City, only adults at least 21 years of age or older can purchase or own a firearm with a permit or license issued by the NYPD. In the rest of the state, adults 18 years of age or older can purchase long guns (rifles & shotguns) without a permit, and only adults 21 years of age or older can purchase or possess a handgun (with the proper licensing requirements). Minors who are at least 16 years of age can possess long guns. Age restrictions on purchasing apply for both FFL dealers and private sales or transfers.

In June 2022, Governor Kathy Hochul (D‑NY) signed legislation to ban persons under the age of 21 from purchasing semi-automatic rifles, ban soft body armor for civilian use, and require gun owners to obtain a license before legally taking possession of any new semi-automatic rifles in the state. Those between 18 and 21 are still permitted to purchase other rifles (bolt action, pump action, lever or single-shot) and can generally buy all categories of shotguns.

Those between the ages of 18 and 21 can only purchase handguns if they are current or honorably discharged members of the armed forces or if they are law enforcement officers.

State assault weapons ban: New York's ban is one of the most restrictive in the country.

Privately made firearms: As of 2019, making, selling, transporting or possessing 3-D-printed guns or other unmarked firearms are prohibited. New York City further bans metal 80% lower receivers that can be used to make a firearm.

Cross registration of handguns: Some counties limit who can register a handgun on their license, with some allowing cross registration of a handgun from any other licensee, to licensed family members only, to no handgun can be cross registered. State law does not address this issue. Sharing use of a handgun not listed on one's license is only allowed at a certified range with the licensed handgun owner present.

Point-of-sale information posting: In 2025 governor Kathy Hochul signed a bill finalizing a requirement that firearms dealers post near the point of sale text in a font no smaller than 26 points information about the 9-8-8 Suicide and Crisis Lifeline, with warnings that firearm ownership can increase the risk of suicide, domestic violence, and overall fatality in the home.

Examples of local laws: NYC, for example, limits the color of all guns by banning colors that would make an actual gun appear like a toy gun, and bans the ownership and sale of all BB guns, paintball guns, air guns, and pellet guns without an appropriate license. Yonkers requires a state pistol permit before one may apply for a permit to own a BB or pellet handgun.

Renewal fees: There are periodic renewal fees, including on restricted carry licenses, like NYC's $340 for a three-year license. Nassau, Westchester and several other suburban counties allow a "to and from the range only" form of concealed carry.

Periodic renewal of licenses: Most counties in the state issue "lifetime" licenses. Elsewhere than in the City of New York and the counties of Nassau and Westchester, any license to carry or possess a pistol or revolver shall be in force and effect until revoked. Renewable licenses vary in cost and last from the 3-year New York City license to five years in the other counties, with New York City's license costing $340 every three years and by contrast, a renewal charge of $10.00 in Suffolk County every 5 years.

Nunchuks: New York's ban on nunchuks was ruled unconstitutional on December 14, 2018.

Gravity knives: New York's classification of gravity knives as "deadly weapons", which led to common inadvertent violations of the law by tradesmen, was repealed on May 30, 2019, thus allowing their possession. The law was previously deemed unconstitutionally vague.

Some local counties have adopted Second Amendment sanctuary resolutions in opposition to some gun control laws.

== NY SAFE Act ==
In the wake of the Sandy Hook Elementary School shooting and the 2012 Webster shooting, New York became the first U.S. state to enact stricter gun control laws on January 15, 2013, when Gov. Andrew Cuomo (D‑NY) signed the NY SAFE Act. New measures included redefining what an assault weapon is, assault weapon registration, prohibition of sales of assault weapons, the prevention of selling or passing on registered assault weapons to friends or family, reducing the maximum allowed magazine capacity from ten rounds to seven rounds, (this part of the SAFE act was redacted in court, as New York State, the court ruled, failed to produce evidence that the provision would stop criminals from simply adding three more rounds to get the magazine to its full, 10-round potential. This ruling makes it again legal to place the full 10 rounds in a detachable or fixed magazine), background checks on almost all gun sales including private sales, background checks on all ammunition sales (has yet to go into effect), additional requirements for reporting of persons with mental health issues, and increased penalties for certain gun crimes. The SAFE Act also includes provisions allowing law enforcement to preemptively seize a person's firearms without a warrant or court order if they have probable cause that the person in question may be mentally unstable or intends to use the weapons to commit a crime.

== See also ==
- Law of New York
- NY SAFE Act
- Sullivan Act
- Concealed carry in the United States § Reciprocity
- Dexter Taylor
