= Dexter Taylor =

American criminal

Dexter Taylor is a software engineer from Bushwick, Brooklyn, who was sentenced to ten years in prison in 2024. He was convicted of weapons charges related to the possession and manufacture of unlicensed firearms, often described as ghost guns. His case has gained attention from gun rights advocates who believe this case has implications for Second Amendment rights.

== Background ==
Taylor, prior to his conviction, worked in the tech industry as a software engineer and was interested in building firearms from home as a hobby. Prior to his conviction, he had no criminal record or violent history. Taylor claimed he believed he was engaging in constitutionally protected activity under the Second Amendment.

== Arrest and trial ==
In 2022, New York authorities raided Taylor's Bushwick apartment and discovered more than a dozen unlicensed firearms, including AR-15-style rifles, semiautomatic pistols, large amounts of ammunition, and equipment for manufacturing guns. Taylor was indicted on multiple weapons charges. In 2024, he was convicted on two counts of second-degree criminal possession of a weapon, three counts of third-degree criminal possession of a weapon, five counts of criminal possession of a firearm, unlawful possession of pistol ammunition, and violating the prohibition on unfinished frames or receivers. Prosecutors argued that his collection of untraceable weapons posed a danger to public safety, while Taylor and his defense maintained that he was engaging in constitutionally protected activity without intent to cause harm.

== Reactions ==
Taylor was sentenced to ten years in prison. The severity of the punishment sparked debate across media and legal circles. Some criticized the sentence as disproportionate, suggesting that Taylor's case illustrated how complex gun laws can criminalize ordinary individuals rather than prevent violence. Taylor's friends have stated that, “he a tinkerer, a software engineer, electronic music composer and amateur TikTok philosopher who made guns as a hobby,” and that, “he doesn’t belong behind bars.”

Advocates for stricter gun control, however, pointed to the risks posed by unlicensed weapons that are untraceable. Media coverage, including from WNYC, framed Taylor's prosecution as emblematic of the broader conflict between state efforts to curb ghost guns and concerns about civil liberties.
