= New York State Rifle & Pistol Ass'n v. City of New York =

New York State Rifle & Pistol Association, Inc. v. City of New York, New York
- Supreme Court of the United States

Argued December 2, 2019 Decided April 27, 2020
- Full case name: New York State Rifle & Pistol Association, Inc., et al. v. City of New York, New York, et al.
- Docket no.: 18-280
- Citations: 590 U.S. 336 (more) 140 S. Ct. 1525; 206 L. Ed. 2d 798

Case history
- Prior: Judgment for defendants, 86 F. Supp. 3d 249 (S.D.N.Y. 2015); aff'd, 883 F.3d 45 (2d Cir. 2018); cert. granted, 139 S. Ct. 939 (2019).

Holding
- The case was moot because New York updated its gun-control rule during the litigation.

Court membership
- Chief Justice John Roberts Associate Justices Clarence Thomas · Ruth Bader Ginsburg; Stephen Breyer · Samuel Alito; Sonia Sotomayor · Elena Kagan; Neil Gorsuch · Brett Kavanaugh

Case opinions
- Per curiam
- Concurrence: Kavanaugh
- Dissent: Alito, joined by Gorsuch; Thomas (except for Part IV–B)

New York State Rifle & Pistol Association, Inc. v. City of New York, New York, 590 U.S. 336 (2020), abbreviated NYSRPA v. NYC and also known as NYSRPA I to distinguish it from the subsequent case, was a case addressing whether the gun ownership laws of New York City, which restrict the transport of a licensed firearm out of one's home, violated the Second Amendment to the United States Constitution, the U.S. Constitution's Commerce Clause, and the right to travel. It was the first major gun-related case that the Supreme Court had accepted for review in nearly ten years, after District of Columbia v. Heller (2008) and McDonald v. City of Chicago (2010). After the Supreme Court agreed to hear the case, New York City and the New York State Legislature amended city and state law respectively to allay the challenged provision. In a per curiam decision in April 2020, the Supreme Court determined that the case was moot, vacating and remanding the case to lower courts to determine "whether petitioners may still add a claim for damages in this lawsuit with respect to New York City's old rule".

Prior to the city's amendments to its laws, the case was seen as a possible vehicle for the Supreme Court's conservative majority to expand gun rights in the United States. In a dissent, Justice Samuel Alito, joined by Justices Neil Gorsuch and Clarence Thomas, expressed their belief that the New York case was not moot, the New York law had violated the petitioners' Second Amendment rights, and Heller had been interpreted too narrowly in the lower courts. Justice Brett Kavanaugh wrote a concurrence but also agreed with Alito's stance that the Supreme Court should review the current application of Heller in lower courts.

== Background ==
The Supreme Court's landmark decision in District of Columbia v. Heller (2008) affirmed that the Second Amendment protected the right of U.S. citizens to own guns within the privacy of their own home but that the sale, possession, and carrying of guns, including specific limitations on weapon types, may be regulated. McDonald v. City of Chicago (2010) affirmed the constitutional right to be incorporated to the states and so prohibited regulations that completely prevent gun ownership. Justice Antonin Scalia, in his majority opinion for Heller, wrote that the Supreme Court was not upholding "a right to keep and carry any weapon whatsoever in any manner whatsoever and for whatever purpose." As a result, there is a wide variety of state legislation stating the types of guns that can be purchased, if a permit and/or license is required before they are owned, if they can be carried in public, and so forth.

The gun laws of New York State are generally considered highly restrictive, and New York City's own ordinances on guns are even more restrictive than those on the state level. Other than certain professions in which gun ownership is considered a necessity, gun owners in New York City may possess a gun within their home only under a "premises license" and the gun must be kept unloaded and in a locked container. Also, gun owners may not transport the guns except directly to and from one of the city's seven shooting ranges. That includes prohibiting the transport of guns to outside the city limits, even to an external shooting range or to a second residence owned by the gun owner. Prior to 2001, the city offered "target licenses" to allow owners to transport their guns to authorized shooting range outside of the city. However, after the city's police had found the licenses to be abused, the city revoked granting the licenses and altered the language of the premises license to emphasize the restriction on travel. Violations of the ordinance could include up to a year in prison.

== District court and court of appeals ==
The New York State Rifle & Pistol Association Inc. and several gun owners in New York City filed suit against the City in 2013 in the United States District Court for the Southern District of New York after they had affirmed with the New York City Police that they could not take their guns in the city out of it to shooting competitions in New Jersey or to homes that they had owned for years. The plaintiffs argued that the ordinance violated their Second Amendment rights, affirmed by Heller, as well as the Dormant Commerce Clause and the right to travel. The District Court issued summary judgment for the City in 2015 and dismissed the plaintiffs' claims. The ruling found the city to have a compelling interest to limit firearms transport to support public safety, and found affected gun owners not to have been prevented from traveling out of the city without their guns or to use shooting ranges with guns purchased outside the city.

The plaintiffs appealed to the U.S. Court of Appeals for the Second Circuit in 2015. The Second Circuit affirmed in early 2018. Applying intermediate scrutiny, the Second Circuit held that the law served an important governmental interest, promoting public safety, and that "the City has met its burden of showing a substantial fit between the Rule and the City's interest in promoting public safety." The Second Circuit also noted that Heller and McDonald affirmed the constitutional right to own guns only to defend one's home, not for transport or use outside the home.

== Supreme Court ==
=== Grant of certiorari ===
The plaintiffs petitioned for writ of certiorari to the Supreme Court, challenged the United States Court of Appeals for the Second Circuit's decisions, and specifically asked if the restriction on gun transport violated their Second Amendment rights, their Dormant Commerce Clause rights, and their right to travel. The Supreme Court granted the petition on January 22, 2019. Because of the case, the Supreme Court placed on hold the decision on whether to take Rogers v. Grewal, a New Jersey case involving the right to carry a loaded gun in public. The issue has resulted in a split among the courts of appeal.

The Supreme Court, until it accepted the New York case in 2019, had denied petitions for certiorari on other gun ownership cases. In one of the most recent denials, issued in February 2018 (during the 2017 term), Justice Clarence Thomas dissented from the denial of certiorari and complained that in his view, "the Second Amendment is a disfavored right in this Court." Justice Anthony Kennedy retired in 2018; his opinion on gun rights was generally considered balanced between government and individuals, which made it difficult for the justices to find the necessary majority to take a case. During the 2018 term, Judge Brett Kavanaugh of the U.S. Court of Appeals for the D.C. Circuit was appointed as Kennedy's replacement and holds conservative views and in previous opinions favored gun ownership. After the Supreme Court granted certiorari, Court observers wrote that if the Court did not determine that the case was moot, it could be a major case that would settle the question of the standard of review to be applied in Second Amendment cases (i.e., whether gun laws are reviewed under intermediate scrutiny, as the Second Circuit decided, or the more demanding strict scrutiny).

=== Change in city and state law and subsequent mootness briefing ===
Gun control groups petitioned New York City to change its gun laws prior to the case's decision as to render the case moot, fearing that with a conservative majority, the Court would create case law that would promote wider gun ownership and weaken gun control legislation. In May 2019, the city initiated a public response period to change the gun control regulation that allowed residents with valid gun licenses to be able to transport the weapons to the shooting ranges in the city limits but not outside the city. By the end of June 2019, the city had revised its gun control ordinances to allow licensed gun holders to transport their weapons in a safe manner to homes or shooting ranges outside of the city.

In filings in July 2019, the city wrote that the issue is moot because of its changes to its law. The city also pointed to a new New York State law, signed by Governor Andrew Cuomo, which allows licensed handgun owners to transport handguns to other places in which they are legally permitted to have them. The New York State Rifle & Pistol Association responded that the case had not been rendered moot and argued that even the changed laws represent a live controversy regarding transport of handguns in New York City. For example, the new regulations allegedly require uninterrupted transportation, which forbids a gun owner from stopping to refuel, and still limit transport outside of the city. The Court continued to instruct all parties to continue to submit filings and briefs prior to the start of the 2019 term. In the first week of the new term in September 2019, the Court considered the mootness of the case in closed conference.

The Supreme Court proceedings in the case took place amid the backdrop of a number of high-profile mass shootings took place in the United States, including the shootings at El Paso, Texas and Dayton, Ohio, in August 2019. Sheldon Whitehouse and four other Democratic senators (Kirsten Gillibrand, Mazie Hirono, Richard Blumenthal, and Dick Durbin) filed an amicus brief that strongly urged the Court to find that the case is moot and criticized the Federalist Society and National Rifle Association of America for promoting what the brief called a "project" to undermine gun-control laws. Referring to the recent mass shootings, the brief said, "In the cloistered confines of this Court, and notwithstanding the public imperatives of these massacres, the NRA and its allies brashly presume, in word and deed, that they have a friendly audience for their 'project.'" The senators' brief argued that "ignoring neutral justiciability principles to reach desired outcomes" would damage the Court's legitimacy as an institution and accelerate a decrease in public faith in the judiciary, and suggested that the Court "heal itself before the public demands it be 'restructured in order to reduce the influence of politics.'"

In its October 7, 2019, orders, the Court denied the request to consider the case moot and stated, "The question of mootness will be subject to further consideration at oral argument."

=== Oral argument ===
Oral argument were on December 2, 2019. Observers believed from the questions asked that the Court would likely rule the case moot and so not attempt to arrive at a judgement that would extend Second Amendment rights. The more conservative Justices Neil Gorsuch and Samuel Alito seemed to favor expanding gun rights, but the liberal side of the Court was joined by Chief Justice John Roberts in asking what was left for the Court to rule on because of the change in the law since certiorari had been granted.

=== Decision ===
The court issued a per curiam decision on April 27, 2020, holding that the case was moot in light of the changed law. The Court ordered the prior rulings vacated and the case remanded to lower courts to consider "whether petitioners may still add a claim for damages in this lawsuit with respect to New York City's old rule." This is a challenged issue between the parties, and the Supreme Court noted, "Petitioners also argue that, even though they have not previously asked for damages with respect to the City's old rule, they still could do so in this lawsuit. Petitioners did not seek damages in their complaint; indeed, the possibility of a damages claim was not raised until well into the litigation in this Court. The City argues that it is too late for petitioners to now add a claim for damages."

While the decision was issued per curiam and thus meant to represent the collective decision of the court, reporters inferred the decision was based on a 6–3 vote based on the attached opinions. In a concurring opinion, Justice Brett Kavanaugh agreed that the case was moot but wrote that he agreed with Justice Samuel Alito's "concern that some federal and state courts may not be properly applying Heller and McDonald" and suggested that "The Court should address that issue soon, perhaps in one of the several Second Amendment cases with petitions for certiorari now pending before the Court." The day of the decision, the Court added ten Second Amendment-based petitions for consideration.

In a lengthy dissent joined by Justice Neil Gorsuch in full and Justice Clarence Thomas in part, Justice Alito wrote, "This case is not moot. The City violated petitioners' Second Amendment right, and we should so hold." He argued that the Court should have evaluated the city's laws in light of Heller and McDonald, and that by rendering the case moot, they have allowed the docket of the Supreme Court to be "manipulated".

== Post-ruling ==
Referencing this case in New York State Rifle & Pistol Association, Inc. v. Bruen, in Justice Alito's concurrence, he states that "after we agreed to review [the Second Circuit's] decision, the city repealed the law and admitted that it did not actually have any beneficial effect on public safety."
