= NY SAFE Act =

New York State gun regulation law

New York State Legislature
- Full name: New York Secure Ammunition and Firearms Enforcement Act
- Signed into law: January 15, 2013
- Governor: Andrew Cuomo
- Associated bills: Gun Legislation Bill

Status: Partly in force (restriction allowing only 7 rounds ruled unconstitutional, changed to 10 rounds)

The New York Secure Ammunition and Firearms Enforcement Act of 2013, commonly known as the NY SAFE Act, is a gun control law in the state of New York. The law was passed by the New York State Legislature and was signed into law by Governor of New York Andrew Cuomo in January 2013. The legislation was written in response to the Sandy Hook Elementary School shooting in Newtown, Connecticut, and the Webster, New York, shooting. Cuomo described the law as the toughest gun control law in the United States.

The NY SAFE Act contains a number of firearms regulations. It also contains a severability provision that allows other measures to remain in place in case the broad prohibitions against weapons are invalidated by the courts.

== Legislative history ==
The New York State Senate approved the act on a 43–18 vote on January 14, 2013. The vote was bipartisan, with nine Senate Republicans voting in favor. State Senator Jeffrey D. Klein sponsored the legislation.

The following day (the second full day of the 2013 legislative session), the New York State Assembly approved the legislation by a 104–43 vote, and Governor Andrew Cuomo signed the bill into law less than one hour later. The passage of the law made New York the first to pass restrictions on gun laws since the Sandy Hook massacre. Cuomo described the law as the toughest gun control law in the United States.

The bill passed under the "message of necessity" procedure, a device in the New York State Constitution by which the governor may expedite a vote on a bill, bypassing a usual three-day waiting period. Although nominally used for emergencies, the "message of necessity" procedure has been frequently used in New York to pass many pieces of legislation (it has been used at least 415 times since 1938).

== Provisions ==
The NY SAFE Act includes the following provisions:

- The act broadened the legal definition of assault weapon to include those semi-automatic rifles, semi-automatic pistols (handguns), and semi-automatic shotguns with one or more "military-style features, such as a telescoping stock, bayonet mount, flash suppressor, grenade launcher and others." This "one-feature test" was a change from the previous "two-feature test," enacted in New York in 2000, which barred such weapons if they had two or more of the enumerated features. The bill provided a "grandfathering" provision allowing those with an assault weapon (under the newer, broader definition), to keep the weapon, but required that it be registered with the New York State Police (with a thirteen-month period to register and a deadline of April 15, 2014). There is no fee to register. Alternatively, owners of such weapons could avoid registration by selling the weapon to a New York State dealer or to someone out-of-state by January 15, 2014, or by permanently removing the design characteristics that make the weapon an assault weapon under the act. Under the act, the registry of assault weapons is confidential and not subject to public disclosure. The constitutionality of the assault-weapon prohibition was upheld by Chief U.S. District Judge William M. Skretny in 2013, and this ruling was affirmed by the U.S. Court of Appeals for the Second Circuit in 2015.
- The act included a high-capacity magazine provision that has been found unconstitutional. According to that language, beginning on April 15, 2013, only magazines with a capacity of seven rounds could legally be sold in New York. The act allowed the continued possession of ten-round magazines purchased before that date, but made it illegal to load more than seven rounds of ammunition into a ten-round magazine except "at an incorporated firing range or competition recognized by the National Rifle Association or International Handgun Metallic Silhouette Association." Historic or antique guns (defined as those manufactured more than fifty years ago) were exempt from this requirement. The magazine provisions were struck down by Judge Skretny in 2013, and this ruling was upheld by the U.S. Court of Appeals for the Second Circuit in 2015, allowing New York gun owners to "legally load 10 rounds in a 10-round magazine." Neither the act nor the subsequent court cases affected New York's pre-existing ten-round magazine limit. The act did not place a limit on the number of magazines that an individual could purchase at any one time.
- The act contains language requiring ammunition dealers to conduct background checks (similar to those for gun buyers) for ammunition purchases, as well as a ban on direct Internet sales of ammunition. (Under the act, online ammunition sales to New Yorkers remain legal, but online buyers are required to purchase ammunition through a licensed dealer in the state and obtain the ammunition in person). As of August 2019, the provisions of the act regarding ammunition background checks have never been implemented because a state database that would make such checks possible has not been created. In 2015, Governor Cuomo and Senate entered into an unusual "memorandum of understanding" suspending the ammunition background check provisions of the act, citing a "lack of adequate technology." The memo stated that the database "cannot be established and/or function in the manner originally intended at this time." The memo did not formally amend the act or have legal effect; according to the governor's office, however, it "provides assurances to all that the database will not be implemented until it is ready and tested."
- The act amended the New York Mental Hygiene Law to add a new reporting requirement for mental health professionals (including physicians, psychologists, registered nurses and licensed clinical social workers). Under this provision, which went into effect on March 16, 2013, mental health professionals currently providing treatment services to an individual must make a report to authorities, "if they conclude, using reasonable professional judgment, that the individual is likely to engage in conduct that would result in serious harm to self or others." The reports are first sent to county officials, and "if they agree with the assessments, the officials then input the names into the state database. The information is retained for five years. If the authorities find a person in the database has a gun permit—necessary to purchase a handgun in New York—they are required to revoke the license and seize any guns. The people in the database are barred from obtaining a permit until their names are purged."
- The act requires owners to report lost or stolen guns and ammunition to authorities, and makes it a misdemeanor to fail to report such a loss or theft within 24 hours.
- The act created a universal background check provision, requiring all sellers or other transferors of firearms and ammunition to conduct background checks (through the National Instant Criminal Background Check System, or NICS) of the prospective purchaser or other transferees, in "all sales, exchanges or disposals of firearms, rifles or shotguns" or ammunition, except those between immediate family members, provided that the transferring family member does not know that the transferee "is prohibited by law from possessing a firearm." The act requires that a prospective firearm transferor and transferee process the sale via a federally licensed dealer (FFL), but "does not mandate that FFLs play this processing role." "An FFL, who does elect to provide the service, may not charge the parties more than $10 per transaction. The seller may leave the gun with the licensed dealer, but the purchaser must appear in person to show identification and fill out an ATF Form 4473," which is retained by the FFL.
- The act requires those who live with a household member "who has been convicted of a felony or domestic violence crime, has been involuntarily committed, or is currently under an order of protection" to "safely store" any guns, using "an appropriate locking device including a trigger lock, a gun safe, or a secure gun cabinet." Failure to do so is made a misdemeanor.
- The act amended New York Penal Law to establish "tougher penalties for those who use illegal guns as well as measures to help combat gang violence."
  - The murder of a first responder engaged in official duties was made a Class A-1 felony, with a mandatory life-without-parole sentence. This was the "Webster provision," named for the 2012 Webster shooting, in which two firefighters were fatally shot by an arsonist.
  - The act increases illegal possession of an unloaded gun and possession of a firearm on school grounds or a school from misdemeanors to a Class E felonies.
  - The act provided that recklessly injuring a child by a firearm, as well as selling or transferring a gun to an individual known to be prohibited from possessing a gun, was a Class D felony.
  - The act provided that "sharing a gun with an individual who is not authorized to possess a gun and commits a crime" was criminal facilitation.
  - The act made straw purchasing (buying a gun "for someone the buyer knows to be disqualified because of a conviction of a crime, an involuntary commitment or other disqualifier") a Class D felony (it was previously a misdemeanor).
  - The act created a mandatory minimum sentence for using or carrying a firearm in drug trafficking or in committing a violent felony – a minimum of five years if loaded, and three if unloaded, with some discretion for the court to impose lower sentences in drug trafficking cases if mitigating factors are present.
  - The act allows prosecutors to seek a sentence of 25 years in prison to life imprisonment (an increase from the previous 15 years) in prosecuting gang members when the gang is involved in murder.
- The act requires the holders of handgun permits to be re-certified every five years with the local county clerk or sheriff.
- The act permits the holders of handgun permit "to request that their application information be made exempt from disclosure under state Freedom of Information Law." This was in response to a controversial website set up in 2010 that published the names of permit holders.

== Support ==
Support for the SAFE Act was strongly polarized by region, with support in New York City and its suburbs, but heavy opposition in upstate New York. Fourteen months after its passage, a Siena College poll showed that 63% of registered New York voters statewide said that they support the SAFE Act, but only 45% of upstate voters did. The New York Times reported that in Upstate New York, "Counties, towns and villages have passed resolutions denouncing the laws, and some counties have even demanded that their official seals not be used on any paperwork relating to them. In response to an open records request, the governor's office shared hundreds of pages of such resolutions, from far-flung places like the Adirondack town of North Hudson, with 238 residents, to more populous areas like Erie County." By contrast, Manhattan District Attorney Cyrus R. Vance, Jr. (D‑NY) strongly supported the law, saying that it would "provide law enforcement with stronger tools to protect our communities from gun violence, including provisions that better enable us to combat gun trafficking and violent gangs, and others that close the state gun show loophole and regulate large-quantity sales of ammunition and firearms."

Following the passage of the act, the New York State Sheriff's Association (NYSSA) wrote a letter offering a mixed opinion on the SAFE Act. The NYSSA favored the parts of the law that enhanced sentences for violent offenses committed with a gun, expanded background checks, and mandated safe storage of guns in households that included a member ineligible to legally use guns. The NYSSA opposed the parts of the law that expanded the definition of assault weapons, limited magazine usage, and limited ammunition sales via the Internet.

== Criticism ==
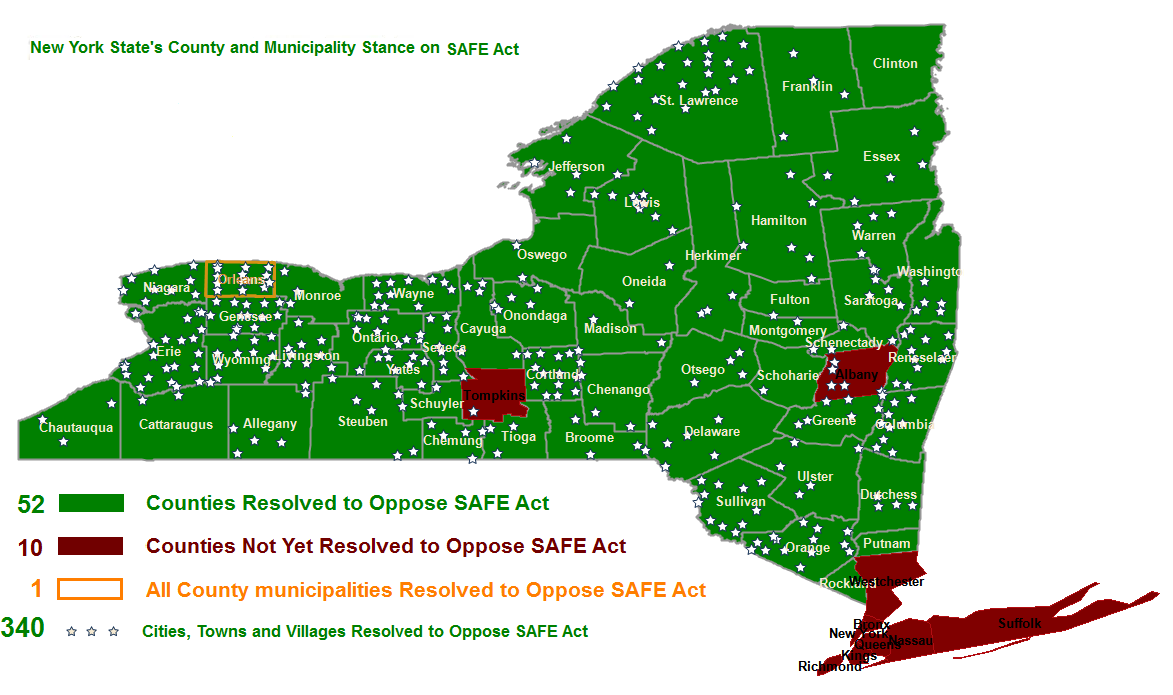
County opposition to SAFE Act

A number of rallies opposing the law have been held at the New York State Capitol in Albany; one in 2014 featured Donald Trump, Rob Astorino, and Carl Paladino, and drew over 3,000 people. Smaller pro-SAFE Act rallies have also occurred in Albany.

The law was criticized as "rushed through" by the state legislature without consideration of whether it would criminalize police and other law enforcement officers who carry firearms with magazines with a larger capacity than those allowed for civilians.

Republicans in the New York Legislature have made a number of unsuccessful efforts over a series of years to repeal the act; these efforts have been led by State Senator Kathleen A. Marchione and State Assemblyman Marc Butler.

Some mental health experts expressed concerns that the law might interfere with their treatment of potentially dangerous individuals, or discourage such people from seeking treatment. The United States Veterans Health Administration (VA) has already said they will not comply with the provision requiring release of certain mental health records as it violates federal patient confidentiality laws.

Others argued that this is a backdoor ban on handgun sales, noting that seven-round magazines simply do not exist for many popular models. After realizing seven-round magazines do not exist for most firearms, New York governor Andrew Cuomo reversed his position on the seven-round limit, stating, "There is no such thing as a seven-bullet magazine [sic]. That doesn't exist, so you really have no practical option." He went on to say the state needs to allow the sale of handguns and rifles with ten-round magazines, but requires the people of New York only load seven rounds in them, except at shooting ranges and competitions. He claimed the law is still enforceable. Cuomo and New York State Senate leaders planned an indefinite suspension of the seven-round magazine limit until they could rewrite the measure. In March 2013 during budget negotiations, Cuomo and lawmakers agreed to continue to allow 10-round magazines to be sold, but could still only be loaded with 7 cartridges.

As of 2015, the number of assault weapons registered had not met expectations, suggesting mass non-compliance with the law. Only around 45,000 such registrations were performed, while the estimated number of assault weapons requiring registration neared 1 million.

== Legal challenges ==
On March 11, 2013, the United States Department of Veterans Affairs announced that it would not follow the provision of the NY SAFE Act requiring mental health professionals to report patients who seem more likely to hurt themselves or others. A Department spokesman stated that federal laws protecting the privacy of veterans take precedence over state laws. Advocates for military veterans had expressed concern that the reporting requirement would deter some people from seeking needed treatment.

Robert L. Schulz and several hundred other gun-rights activists pursued a legal challenge against the NY SAFE Act in New York state court, arguing that the act was unconstitutional as Governor Cuomo's use of a "message of necessity" to waive the usual three-day waiting period had violated the New York State Constitution. Judge Thomas J. McNamara of the New York Supreme Court denied the plaintiffs' request for an injunction and later dismissed the challenge, finding no constitutional violation.

A separate challenge took place in federal court. In December 2013, Chief U.S. District Judge William M. Skretny, of the Federal District Court in Buffalo, upheld most of the New York SAFE Act, saying that its provisions "further the state's important interest in public safety.... it does not totally disarm New York's citizens; and it does not meaningfully jeopardize their right to self-defense". However he struck down the provision that only seven rounds of ammunition could be loaded into a ten-round magazine, calling it "an arbitrary restriction" that violated the Second Amendment, and saying that it could result in "pitting the criminal with a fully-loaded magazine against the law-abiding citizen limited to seven rounds."

The New York State Rifle and Pistol Association dropped its suit in March 2016. Following the death of Justice Antonin Scalia, it decided it was unlikely to win a favorable Supreme Court opinion.

Since the 2022 NYSRPA v. Bruen Supreme Court decision striking down another New York gun law, the Sullivan Act (a law pertaining to the application of a pistol/conceal carry permit) from 1911, as unconstitutional, the old standard of interest balancing for deciding the constitutionality of a law has been abolished. Under the previous standard, a law found to be a violation of the Second Amendment could be upheld if it was in the state's interest of public safety. Under the new standard, interest balancing no longer exists. Rather, a law may be struck down if it is a violation of the Second Amendment and if there is no text, history, or tradition of a similar law dating back to the ratification of the Second Amendment in the 1780s.

Due to the recent changes, new challenges to the SAFE Act and other New York gun laws have been proposed and discussed.

== Subsequent amendments ==
The NY SAFE Act as originally passed did not explicitly exempt police officers from some of the law's provisions, such as the seven-round limit, although older law (not repealed by the NY SAFE Act) did provide such an exemption. This prompted some initial confusion, but the office of Governor Andrew Cuomo said soon after passage that police officers were exempt from the seven-round limit. In July 2013, Cuomo signed into law a measure that expressly exempted qualified retired law enforcement officers from some of the provisions of the act. The exemption allows retired officers (who served for at least ten years and left in good standing) to retain guns and magazines purchased as part of official duty, so long as registered with the state within 60 days of retiring.

== Impact on gun manufacturers ==
In 2013, Justin Moon's Kahr Arms of Pearl River, a gun manufacturer, announced that it would be moving its headquarters from New York to Pennsylvania after the passing of the NY SAFE Act. The company also announced that it would be building a manufacturing facility in Pennsylvania, rather than Orange County, New York, as it had looked into. AR15.com moved in 2013 from Farmington to Texas after passage of the act.

In 2014, the Remington Arms Co. decided to open a manufacturing plant in Huntsville, Alabama. The president of United Mine Workers Local 717, which represents workers at Remington's existing plant in Ilion, New York expressed fears about the future of the New York facility and citing the NY SAFE Act for the company's decision to expand in Alabama rather than New York. Subsequently, about 100 Remington jobs were shifted from New York to Alabama; a Remington Outdoor Company CEO said that the SAFE Act (alongside other factors such as "workforce quality, business environment, tax and economic incentives, and existing infrastructure") contributed to the shift.

== See also ==
- Gun laws in New York
- State hunting licenses
