= New York State Rifle and Pistol Association =

Organization

- Formation: 1871; 155 years ago
- Headquarters: East Greenbush, New York
- President: Tom King
- Website: www.nysrpa.org

The New York State Rifle & Pistol Association (NYSRPA) is the U.S. state of New York's largest and oldest firearms advocacy organization. Established in 1871, the NYSRPA is dedicated to the preservation of gun rights, firearm safety and education, and shooting sports. It is associated with the National Rifle Association of America ("NRA") and engages locally in many activities similar to the NRA.

== Activities ==
Active members in the NYSRPA engage in many different activities. The organization is engaged in legislation and political awareness campaigns in New York. It sponsors and holds competitive firearm sporting events across the state. Finally, it educates and supports various firearm activities of particular interest to juniors and women in the community.

== Lawsuits ==
On January 29, 2013, NYSRPA filed a notice of legal claim against the highly controversial NY SAFE Act.

In a separate challenge, NYSRPA sued the City of New York on March 29, 2013, seeking to invalidate the city's restriction on transporting handguns outside of the city. The District Court ruled in favor of New York, and the Second Circuit Court of Appeals affirmed. The Supreme Court of the United States granted NYSRPA's request to review the case, and New York State Rifle & Pistol Association, Inc. v. City of New York was argued before the Supreme Court in 2019.

The U.S. Supreme Court agreed to hear New York State Rifle & Pistol Association, Inc. v. Bruen, a case challenging New York State's concealed carry permit system. Paul Clement, an attorney who represents NYSRPA, petitioned the Supreme Court to answer the question "Whether the Second Amendment allows the government to prohibit ordinary law-abiding citizens from carrying handguns outside the home for self-defense". The Supreme Court granted the petition on April 26, 2021, but re-framed the question to "Whether the state's denial of petitioners' applications for concealed-carry licenses for self-defense violated the second amendment".

NYSRPA executive director Tom King objects to the state's gun law, which requires anyone seeking a license to carry a concealed weapon to demonstrate "a special need for self-protection." King said that violates his Second Amendment rights.

== See also ==
- Gun Owners of New Hampshire
