= 2025 Coeur d'Alene shooting =

Shooting attack in Idaho, U.S.

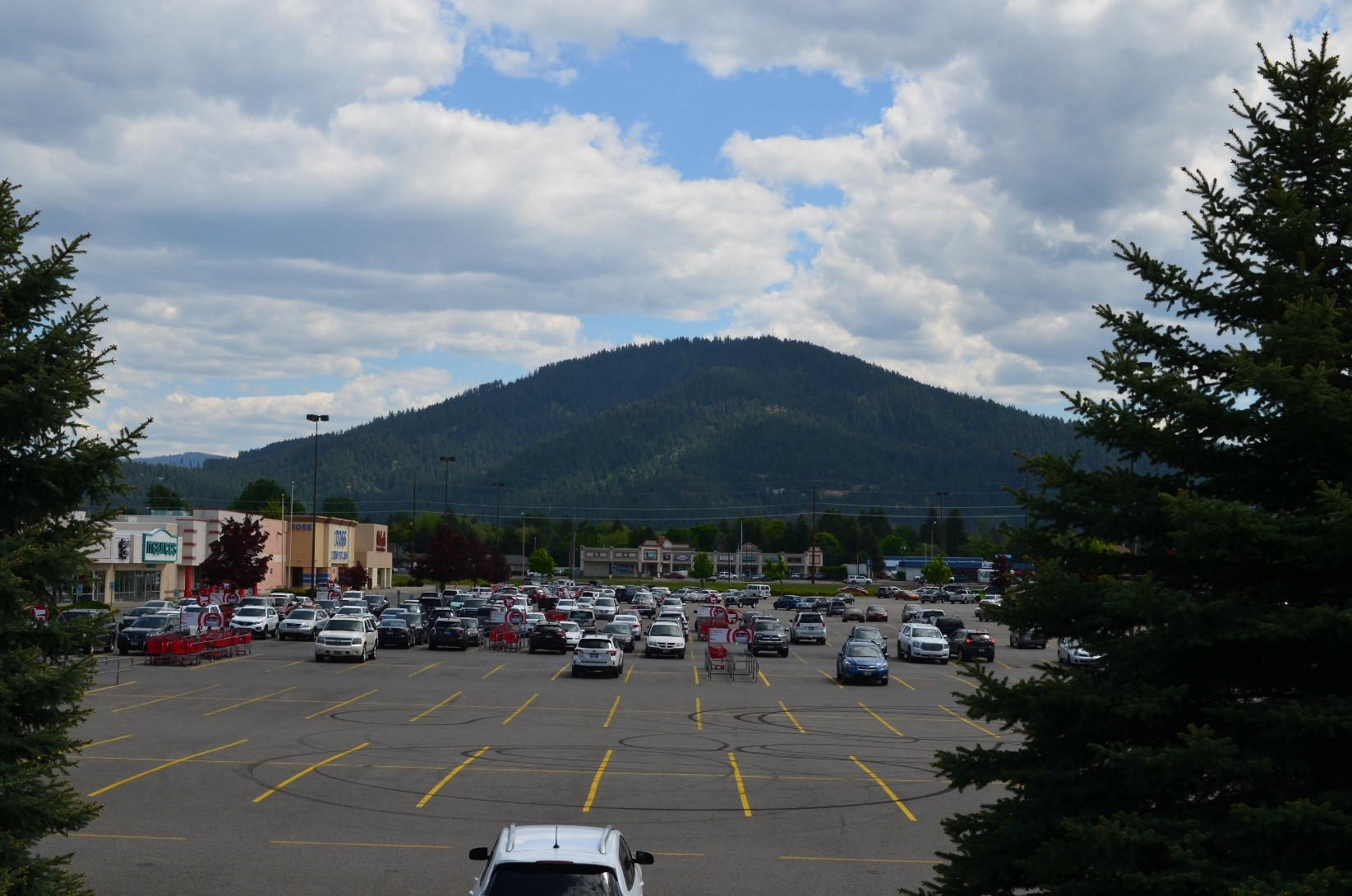
- Canfield Mountain looking east from U.S. Route 95
- Location: 47°43′03″N 116°45′00″W; Canfield Mountain, Coeur d'Alene, Idaho, United States
- Date: June 29, 2025 c.14:00 – c.19:40 (PDT (UTC−7))
- Target: First responders
- Attack type: Ambush, arson, murder-suicide
- Weapons: 12-gauge Mossberg Maverick 88 pump-action shotgun; .22-caliber Marlin Model 60 semi-automatic rifle (unused)
- Deaths: 3 (including the perpetrator)
- Injuries: 1
- Perpetrator: Wess Val Roley
- Motive: Undetermined
- Coroners: Kootenai County Coroner's Office; Spokane County Medical Examiner's Office

On June 29, 2025, an intentionally set brush fire on the west slope of Canfield Mountain in Coeur d'Alene, Idaho, United States, was used to ambush first responders. Twenty-year-old Wess Val Roley fired 12-gauge shotgun slugs at the first-arriving crews, killing Battalion Chiefs Frank Harwood and John Morrison and critically wounding Engineer David Tysdal; Roley died from an apparent self-inflicted gunshot wound after a five-hour manhunt that drew more than 300 local, state and federal officers.

The deliberately lit Nettleton Gulch Fire burned approximately 23 acres (9.3 ha) of steep, timbered terrain. Crews reached 75 percent containment by July 2 and declared the wildfire 100 percent contained on July 4, 2025.

Investigators have not established a motive, calling the event "a total ambush" on unarmed firefighters; the incident has renewed national attention on rising assaults against U.S. fire and EMS personnel.

== Background ==
Canfield Mountain is a 3,900 ft (1,200 m) forested ridge bordering the city's greenbelt which is popular with hikers and mountain-bike riders. North Idaho entered the 2025 fire season with above-average fuel loads following an unusually dry spring, prompting heightened wildfire alerts from the Idaho Department of Lands (IDL).

== Timeline ==
At 1:21 p.m. PDT on June 29, 2025, Kootenai County dispatchers received a 9-1-1 call reporting a brush fire in Nettleton Gulch on the west flank of Canfield Mountain; it was accordingly given the name Nettleton Gulch fire.

Around 2:00 p.m. the first engine companies—drawn from the Coeur d'Alene Fire Department, Kootenai County Fire & Rescue and the Northern Lakes Fire District—arrived on scene and promptly came under gunfire. Firefighters radioed that multiple shots were being fired and took cover behind their apparatus, temporarily suspending suppression efforts.

Witness statements released at a June 30 briefing indicate that Roley spoke briefly with the first-arriving firefighters, who had asked him to move his vehicle. Investigators believe Roley used a flint starter to ignite the brush and "deliberately lured" the firefighters into a kill zone on the mountain's western slope. Investigators believe Roley used his arborist climbing skills, perching in a tree to gain an elevated line of fire before shooting slugs.

At 3:16 p.m. detectives traced a ping from Roley's mobile telephone on the upper mountain, allowing SWAT units and air assets to tighten the search perimeter. Between 4:05 p.m. and 4:30 p.m. county officials issued a shelter-in-place order for neighborhoods east of downtown Coeur d'Alene, warning residents to remain indoors while the gunman was at large. Police scanner traffic during the afternoon suggested that deputies had located a vehicle believed to be linked to the attack.

At 7:40 p.m. SWAT officers found Roley dead from an apparent self-inflicted gunshot wound in dense timber near the fireline; a firearm was recovered beside the body. Kootenai County Sheriff Robert Norris stated that evidence indicated Roley had set the fire specifically to ambush first responders and that he had acted alone.

With the crime scene secured, Idaho Department of Lands crews hiked in between 7:30 and 10:00 p.m. and began cutting a hand-line around what was now a 15 to 20 acres (6.1 to 8.1 ha) fire. Overnight the blaze grew to cover about 26 acres (11 ha) of steep, timbered ground, leaving a visible smoke haze over Coeur d'Alene the following morning.

== Victims ==
Two firefighters were killed while another was injured during the shooting.

The deceased were identified as Battalion Chief Frank Harwood, 42, of Kootenai County Fire & Rescue, and Battalion Chief John Morrison, 52, of the Coeur d'Alene Fire Department. Harwood was a 17-year fire service veteran and also served in the Army National Guard, while Morrison had over 28 years of experience in fire service. Both Harwood and Morrison were pronounced dead at the scene.

The injured firefighter, Engineer David Tysdal, 47, suffered severe chest and spinal trauma and underwent three surgeries; he remained hospitalized in stable condition as of July 2. Despite being shot twice and pinned inside his disabled brush rig, Tysdal continued to transmit over the radio—reporting, "I'm inside the rig. ... I can't move", and providing key information to dispatchers. He described the shooter as wearing "dark clothing, maybe a mask", helping law enforcement narrow the suspect profile during the unfolding manhunt.

Private memorial services for Battalion Chiefs John Morrison and Frank Harwood were announced on July 4, 2025, to be held the following week at the Hagadone Event Center in Coeur d'Alene. Public celebrations of life were held on July 10 (for Morrison) and July 11 (for Harwood) featuring the IAFF Pipes & Drums and Honor Guard.

On July 15, 2025, Tysdal was transferred from Kootenai Health to a specialized spinal-recovery facility in Colorado.

On August 28, 2025, the fire department shared a further update saying Tysdal had been shot in the back, collapsing his left lung, damaging his clavicle, shattering several ribs and causing spinal swelling; he remained at a specialty hospital in Colorado. The department said he was still unable to move his legs but that his wound, clavicle, lungs and arm strength were "getting better and better each day", and relayed thanks from his family for nationwide support. Doctors had said in July that leg movement could return as swelling subsides.

== Aftermath ==
A temporary no-fly zone for unauthorised aircraft and drones was declared over Canfield Mountain within hours of the ambush.

More than 300 law-enforcement officers—local, state and federal—were ultimately mobilized for the response and evidence-recovery effort. Specialists from the Federal Bureau of Investigation and the Bureau of Alcohol, Tobacco, Firearms and Explosives stayed on scene overnight to document ballistics evidence, while the Idaho Department of Lands resumed suppression once the mountain was declared safe.

Because ground crews had been pinned down for several hours, the Nettleton Gulch Fire grew to roughly 26 acres (11 ha) of steep, timbered terrain by the morning of June 30. IDL reported preliminary hand-lines around the perimeter but no formal containment figure, and urged residents to remain ready to evacuate should winds shift.

That evening a miles-long procession carried the two fallen firefighters from Kootenai Health Hospital to the Spokane County Medical Examiner; residents lined freeway overpasses waving U.S. and Idaho flags or saluting as the convoy passed. A second, larger procession was scheduled for the morning of July 1 to return Harwood and Morrison from the Spokane County Medical Examiner to Coeur d'Alene; the motorcade was set to depart at 10:00 a.m., travel eastbound on I-90 and enter the city via Sherman Avenue.

Governor Brad Little ordered all U.S. and Idaho flags to be flown at half-staff until the day after the firefighters' memorial service. In a statement, he said: "All our public safety officers, especially our firefighters, bravely confront danger on a daily basis but we have never seen a heinous act of violence like this on our firefighters before. This is not Idaho. This indescribable loss is felt deeply by all those in the firefighting community and beyond." During debate on an unrelated spending bill, Senators Mike Crapo and Jim Risch led a moment of silence in the U.S. Senate, while the International Association of Fire Fighters (IAFF) called the ambush "a heinous act of violence" and dispatched peer-support teams to Coeur d'Alene.

Local churches opened for counseling sessions, and regional critical-incident stress-management teams offered free debriefings to first-responder agencies. Community members also launched several crowd-funding pages to help the families of the slain and injured firefighters.

== Perpetrator ==
A day after the shooting, authorities identified the gunman as Wess Val Roley (May 1, 2005 – June 29, 2025), a California native who had recently been living in Idaho. Kootenai County Sheriff Robert Norris said Roley appeared to have shot himself with a shotgun recovered beside his body.

Public records indicate that Roley lived in California and later in Phoenix, Arizona, before relocating to Idaho. Former classmates at North Phoenix Preparatory Academy told USA Today that he was "obsessed with guns" and frequently discussed politics, voicing strong support for Donald Trump; several also said he drew swastikas and firearms in notebooks, which they viewed as attempts to appear "edgy". Roley left school midway through his sophomore year to join his father's tree-trimming business in Idaho, and his grandfather said he "wanted to be a fireman ... working in the forest" and "idolized firefighters".

In the year before the attack, friends noted increasingly erratic behavior. A former roommate in Sandpoint, Idaho, TJ Franks, said Roley shaved his head, barricaded a bathroom door with a chair, and often walked around partially clothed. Detectives later found Roley's heavily packed pickup truck in an embankment near the fire line and believe he had been living out of the vehicle. Norris reported five prior law-enforcement contacts—mostly trespass calls and welfare checks—but no criminal record. Roley tried several times to enlist in the U.S. Army but was ruled ineligible each time, an Army spokesperson confirmed without detailing the reason; he had long spoken of military service and once arrived at school with a buzz cut while talking about ROTC.

Investigators believe Roley used a flint starter to ignite brush, drawing firefighters into what Norris called a "kill zone". His grandfather confirmed that he owned a shotgun and a .22-caliber rifle; detectives verified that a shotgun was used in the attack but have not ruled out additional firearms. Franks added that while Roley lived with him, he collected knives and swords but no guns. At a June 30 news conference, authorities released a screenshot of a now-deleted Instagram story showing him in dark camouflage and a mask while Björk's "Hunter" played in the background.

== Investigation ==
Investigators have not identified a motive. Criminal justice expert Joe Giacalone, comparing the case to the attempted assassination of Donald Trump in Pennsylvania involving 20-year-old Thomas Matthew Crooks, noted: "What's going on with 20-year-old males that make them want to do this? ... Specifically targeting firemen who are unarmed and they are walking into a situation where they think they are trying to help somebody. That's another layer." Attorney Justin Whittenton, representing Roley's family in Arizona, issued a statement on their behalf: "There are no words that can suffice for this tragedy and the infinite losses suffered by those affected by this shooting. We do not understand why this happened or how this came about."

At a July 22 press briefing, Sheriff Robert Norris released portions of a handwritten note to the suspect's father recovered from Roley's truck—reading in part, "Tomorrow, I shall go into battle. ... I bid thee farewell"—and displayed drawings seized by detectives. Investigators said they recovered a .22-caliber semiautomatic rifle that was not fired, a flint and lighters used to start the brush fire, and that Roley had inquired about U.S. military enlistment in 2023 and approached the Coeur d’Alene Fire Department about a job in May 2025.

== Responses ==
=== Law-enforcement and federal agencies ===
More than a dozen public-safety agencies converged on Canfield Mountain within the first two hours of the incident.

- The Kootenai County Sheriff's Office served as incident command, supported by the Idaho State Police, the Coeur d'Alene Police Department and neighbouring police and sheriff's offices from Spokane, Shoshone, and Bonner counties.
- The FBI deployed crisis-negotiation specialists, evidence-response technicians and aerial-surveillance assets from its Spokane Resident Agency.
- The Bureau of Alcohol, Tobacco, Firearms and Explosives Seattle Field Division sent ballistics experts and certified fire investigators to examine the crime scene and the point of fire origin.
- Air support included a U.S. Customs and Border Protection Eurocopter AS350 Écureuil helicopter equipped with FLIR, two Spokane County Sheriff's helicopters and at least one armored rescue vehicle from the region's multijurisdictional SWAT team.
- At a June 30 briefing, Kootenai County Fire & Rescue Chief Christopher Way said local police would accompany fire and EMS crews on every call "for at least the next several days", to bolster responder safety.

=== Fire and emergency medical support ===
Because the first-arriving engines "came under fire almost immediately" and were forced to take cover, direct suppression was suspended until the slope was declared safe later that evening.

Once law-enforcement lifted the security hold (about 7:30 p.m.), the Idaho Department of Lands (IDL) ordered extra hand crews, engines, heavy equipment and aircraft to reinforce the overnight attack on the Nettleton Gulch Fire. Improved mapping refined the burned area to 23 acres (9.3 ha).

By the evening of July 4, 2025, officials reported the fire was 100% contained and began demobilizing resources while shifting remaining personnel to suppression-repair work.

On July 8, the U.S. Forest Service lifted the temporary Canfield Mountain area closure, noting that interior hotspots had cooled but warning hikers of lingering hazards such as rolling debris and weakened trees.

No structures were damaged and no evacuations were required.

Air‑medical cover was provided by Life Flight Network—a helicopter was staged near Kootenai Health and another was waiting in the area around 5:20 p.m.—and numerous ground ambulances from neighboring jurisdictions also mustered near the command post.

=== Political and organizational reactions ===
Governor Brad Little described the ambush as an "evil attack on the people who dedicate their lives to protecting and serving our communities" and activated the state emergency operations centre to coordinate wildfire and investigative resources. The IAFF dispatched a peer-support team to Coeur d'Alene.

== See also ==
- 2024 Burnsville shooting, another shooting where first responders were killed
- 2012 Webster shooting, a similar shooting where a house was set on fire to lure in firefighters to be ambushed
- Gun violence in the United States
