= A Girl & A Gun =

American women-only gun club

A Girl & A Gun Women's Shooting League
- Founded: 2011
- Headquarters: Round Rock, Texas, United States
- Number of locations: 300+
- Key people: Robyn Sandoval, President & CEO; Tatiana Whitlock, Training Director
- Products: Firearms training
- Website: www.agirlandagun.org

A Girl & A Gun (AG & AG) is a women-only gun club introducing women and girls to pistol, rifle, and shotgun shooting. The league is designed to "help ladies feel more comfortable when talking to instructors and handling a firearm."

== Competitive shooting ==
In 2014 AG & AG members shot as the first all-ladies squad competing in the International Defensive Pistol Association National Championships. In 2015, A Girl & A Gun hosted the first all-ladies squad competing in the IDPA Smith & Wesson Indoor National Championship.

== NSSF Women's Study ==
AG & AG was selected to participate in a commissioned study by the National Shooting Sports Foundation (NSSF). The report, "Women Gun Owners: Purchasing, Perceptions and Participation", was presented at the 2015 SHOT Show in Las Vegas, Nevada. The objective of the study was to "understand female gun owners including behaviors, attitudes, motivating factors influencing participation in shooting activities and social and environmental factors creating opportunities and barriers to participation." Pages 59 through 64 of the report highlights AG & AG members specifically. The report states, "AG & AG members own, on average, over one and a half times the number of guns women from the general sample own. AG & AG members also significantly outspent the general sample of women for guns and accessories. Nearly all of AG & AG members (98%) have had training as compared to the general sample's 69% and AG & AG members average nearly 1.5 more classes than the general sample. Finally, AG & AG members are considerably more active participating on average once per month or more frequently as compared to the average few times a year of the general sample. AG & AG members are considerably different in their attitudes towards guns and shooting activities. AG & AG members tend to feel more secure and empowered because of their knowledge of guns; less insecure and nervous about handling guns; more enthusiastic about shooting activities."
