= Sullivan Act =

New York state law

New York State Legislature
- Full name: AN ACT to amend the penal law, in relation to the sale and carrying of dangerous weapons
- Senate voted: May 10, 1911
- Signed into law: May 25, 1911
- Sponsor(s): Sen. Timothy Sullivan
- Governor: John Alden Dix
- Website: hdl.handle.net

Status: Partially struck down (New York State Rifle & Pistol Association, Inc. v. Bruen)

The Sullivan Act was a gun control law in New York state that took effect in 1911. The New York state law requires licenses for New Yorkers to possess firearms small enough to be concealed. Private possession of such firearms without a license was a misdemeanor, and carrying them in public is a felony. The law was the subject of controversy regarding both its selective enforcement and the licensing bribery schemes it enabled. The act was named for its primary legislative sponsor, state senator Timothy Sullivan, a Tammany Hall Democrat.

For handguns, the Sullivan Act qualifies as a may issue act, meaning the local police have discretion to issue a concealed carry license, as opposed to a shall issue act, in which state authorities must give a concealed handgun license to any person who satisfies specific criteria, often a background check and a safety class. According to a 2022 study, the law had no impact on overall homicide rates, reduced overall suicide rates, and caused a large and sustained decrease in gun-related suicide rates.

The case New York State Rifle & Pistol Association, Inc. v. Bruen was decided in the U.S. Supreme Court, evaluating the constitutionality of this law on Second Amendment grounds. The court held arguments in November 2021, with the majority striking down the "proper cause" requirement of the current law on June 23, 2022, for violating both the Second and Fourteenth Amendments to the United States Constitution.

== History ==
Sullivan introduced the state-wide legislation "partly in response to a marked increase in highly publicized violent street crime below Fourteenth Street" (i.e. in the largely Italian immigrant Lower East Side) and was partially an anti-Italian reaction to perceived violent crime committed by Italian immigrants in New York City. Sullivan and other prominent New Yorkers were under public pressure to act, in the form of letters and recommendations from George Petit le Brun, who worked in the city's coroner's office, after a "brazen early afternoon" murder-suicide near Gramercy Park. The law went into effect on August 31, 1911.

The law also made it a felony to own or sell other items defined as so called "dangerous weapons", including "blackjacks, bludgeons, sandbags, sandclubs, billies, slungshots and metal knuckles."

According to Richard F. Welch, who wrote a 2009 biography of Sullivan, "all the available evidence indicates that Tim's fight to bring firearms under control sprang from heartfelt conviction." At the time, "some complained that the law would only succeed in disarming lawful citizens, while others suspected that Sullivan was just trying to rein in the thugs on his own payroll." Lawman Bat Masterson, a friend of Sullivan's, criticized the law as "obnoxious" and said that he questioned Sullivan's mental state of mind over the law.

== New York City license holders ==
In New York State, outside New York City, the practices for issuing concealed carry licenses vary from county to county.

In New York City, the licensing authority is the police department, which rarely issues carry licenses to anyone except retired police officers, or those who can describe why the nature of their employment (for example, a diamond merchant who regularly carries gemstones, or a district attorney who regularly prosecutes dangerous criminals) requires carrying a concealed handgun. Critics of the law have alleged that New Yorkers with political influence, wealth, or celebrity appear to be issued licenses more liberally. The New York Post, the New York Sun, and other newspapers have periodically obtained the list of licensees through Freedom of Information Act requests and have published the names of individuals they consider to be wealthy, famous, or politically connected that have been issued carry licenses by the city police department.

Several NYPD license division officers and others were convicted in federal court for participating in a bribery scheme where they accepted bribes from at least 2012 through 2016 in exchange for hundreds of permits in instances where permits would not be approved. These officers conspired with "expediting" businesses, and some created these businesses after retiring from the police force.

== Litigation ==
In the case Kachalsky v. Cacace (2012), a unanimous panel of the United States Court of Appeals for the Second Circuit upheld the constitutionality of the Sullivan Act, and rejected challengers' positions that New York state handgun law violates the Second and Fourteenth Amendments to the Constitution.

On April 26, 2021, the Supreme Court of the United States granted certiorari in New York State Rifle & Pistol Association, Inc. v. Bruen, seeking to examine whether the Sullivan Act and the may-issue policies, in general, violate the Second Amendment to the United States Constitution. On June 23, 2022, the "proper cause" requirement of the Sullivan Act was struck down by the Supreme Court of the United States, leaving the general licensing requirement in place.

New York State Rifle & Pistol Association, Inc. v. Bruen, (Bruen), marked a significant point in Second Amendment cases. Before Bruen, the United States Supreme Court had not made a major development in second amendment cases since its decision in District of Columbia v. Heller in 2008 (Heller). As such, the court's decision had a major effect on all fifty states. In Bruen, the majority set a new standard for evaluating the constitutionality of regulations that restrict Second Amendment freedoms. Specifically, the court established that "only if a firearm is consistent with the Nation's 'historic tradition' may a court conclude that the individuals conduct falls outside the Second Amendment's "unqualified command."

In supporting its opinion, the Supreme Court drew very strongly on its prior opinion in District of Columbia v. Heller. In Heller, the court established that individuals have a constitutional right, provided for by the Second Amendment to the United States Constitution, to "keep and bear arms" within the confines of their homes. As such, laws in which restricted or barred an individuals ability to keep said arms in their homes usually violate the Second Amendment. This included any statutory provisions that resulted in arms being rendered inoperable for home defense such as requiring that such arms be "disassembled or bound by a trigger lock."

The Supreme Court referenced its reluctance in Heller to rely on the balancing approach employed by lower courts, because its focus was on whether any restrictive regulations were "analogous" to those in place at the time the states ratified both the Second and Fourteenth Amendments. Moreover, the court also had strong support for its reasoning based on their finding in Heller that the right to bear arms afforded by the Second Amendment is not diminished by the fact that the Second Amendment was established to ensure the creation of a future militia. Further drawing support from its decision in Heller, the court noted that while gun owners can keep arms in their home, it's not a place where they need to "bear or carry" guns. As such, it must be the Second Amendment's intention to protect the right to bear or carry arms in public to provide an avenue for self-defense.

The Supreme Court's decision in Bruen continues to have ripple effects on Second Amendment cases, including administrative ones. In Ms. Donna Y. Frazier, the Office of the Attorney General of Louisiana held that a requirement for firearms ammunition to be kept separate from the firearms themselves was unconstitutional pursuant to both the Second and the Fourteenth Amendments to the United States Constitution. The court applied the test established in Bruen requiring the government to "affirmatively prove that its firearms regulation is part of the historical tradition that delimits the outer bounds of the right to keep and bear arms." In so doing, the court found that this law essentially rendered a citizen's ability to rely on self-defense "impossible". Consequently, given that there was no adequate support provided via evidence or otherwise that would "overcome the presumptive right" established in Bruen.

In Range v. Attorney General United States of America, the United States Court of Appeals, Third Circuit, adopted the Bruen standard to justify allowing Range, who would be considered a felon in most states, to purchase a firearm. Specifically, Range pled guilty to the misdemeanor of making a false statement to obtain food stamps, which was punishable by up to five years' incarceration. As such, Range was denied the ability to purchase a firearm pursuant to 18 U.S.C. §922(g)(1) which makes it unlawful for any person who has been convicted in any court, of a crime punishable by imprisonment for a term exceeding one year to possess in or affecting commerce, any firearm or ammunition. However, the court noted that post Bruen, the proper standard is no longer means-end scrutiny, but rather the focus on history and tradition. Consequently, the court held that the government did not show that the historical tradition of firearms regulation supports depriving Range of his Second Amendment right to possess a firearm. As such, the court opened the door for individuals who would otherwise be barred from exercising their second amendment right as a result of the fact that their crimes may technically classified as felonies due to their punishable years, to exercise such rights.

== Controversy ==
The first person convicted under the law was an Italian immigrant named Marino Rossi who was traveling to a job interview and carrying a revolver for fear of the Black Hand. At sentencing the judge, condemning Italian immigrants in general, declared: "It is unfortunate that this is the custom with you and your kind, and that fact, combined with your irascible nature, furnishes much of the criminal business in this country." Before Marino's arrest, others had been arrested under the new law but were released without charges. Whether this was part of the law's intent, it was passed on a wave of anti-immigrant and anti-Italian rhetoric as a measure to disarm an alleged Italian and immigrant criminal element. The police department who granted the licenses could easily discriminate against "undesirable" elements. Days before the law took effect The New York Times published an article saying "Low-browed foreigners bargained for weapons of every description and gloated over their good fortune in hearing of the drop in the gun market before it was too late". After Rossi's conviction The New York Times called this "warning to the Italian community" both "timely and exemplary".

According to Peter Duffy of The New York Times, the Sullivan Law did not just affect Second Amendment laws in New York state; it also became the blueprint for legislation that was later enacted throughout the United States. Moreover, Duffy noted that the bill itself received serious hostility from gun manufacturers, and that one state senator even noted that Sullivan's bill "won't stop murders." An anonymous citizen also wrote to the New York Times and states that "he objected to the automatic establishment of a presumption of felonious intent by the proposed law on the part of a citizen possessed of arms for home defense. Hence the unconstitutionality of the proposed law."

According to New York City historian George Lankevich, the Act was passed so that Sullivan could have friends in the police force plant handguns on his rivals and take them to jail. There were others who also tied the act to Sullivan's ties with criminals so much so that they "suggested that Big Tim pushed through his law so Tammany could keep their gangster allies under control."

== Constitutionality ==
In his concurring opinion in New York State Rifle & Pistol Association, Inc. v. Bruen, Justice Samuel Alito wrote:

All that we decide in this case is that the Second Amendment protects the right of law-abiding people to carry a gun outside the home for self-defense and that the Sullivan Law, which makes that virtually impossible for most New Yorkers, is unconstitutional.

== See also ==
- Gun laws in New York
- NY SAFE Act
- Gun politics in the United States
