= Legal debate =

Form of academic debate

A legal debate is a discussion between lawyers, legal academics, jurists, politicians, and others who might have interest or expertise in the law, about a particular legal issue.

Legal debates can take many forms, and do not necessarily need to be in person. Most take place on paper—judges within a court, for example, might debate each other. Legal debates include:

== Debates between judges ==
Judges debate face-to-face during judicial conferences, but more often by issuing written opinions. U.S. Supreme Court decisions present a prominent example. Antonin Scalia published many dissents. These debates typically often centered around the proper means of interpreting federal statutes or the Constitution.

== Debate between politicians ==
An example of this debate is that between the President of the United States and the United States Congress over the ability of the executive power to issue warrantless wiretaps. The legal debate at issue is the scope of executive power vis-a-vis other branches of government.

== Societal debate ==
Societies debate the legal order. Elections may trigger legal debates, as happened in the US 2000 Presidential election in Bush v. Gore.

== Contemporary legal debates ==
Debates in Western societies address broad themes, including:

- balance between state power and civil liberties
- breadth of civil liberties relative to social norms and moral expectations

In the United States, legal debates include:

- Right to privacy, including the right to have an abortion
- Balance between civil rights and security after September 11, 2001
- Constitutional interpretation
- Affirmative Action
- Welfare reform
- Abortion
- Elections

== See also ==
- Constitutional law
- Jurisprudence
- United States Supreme Court
