= 2012 Webster shooting =

Mass shooting in New York, U.S.

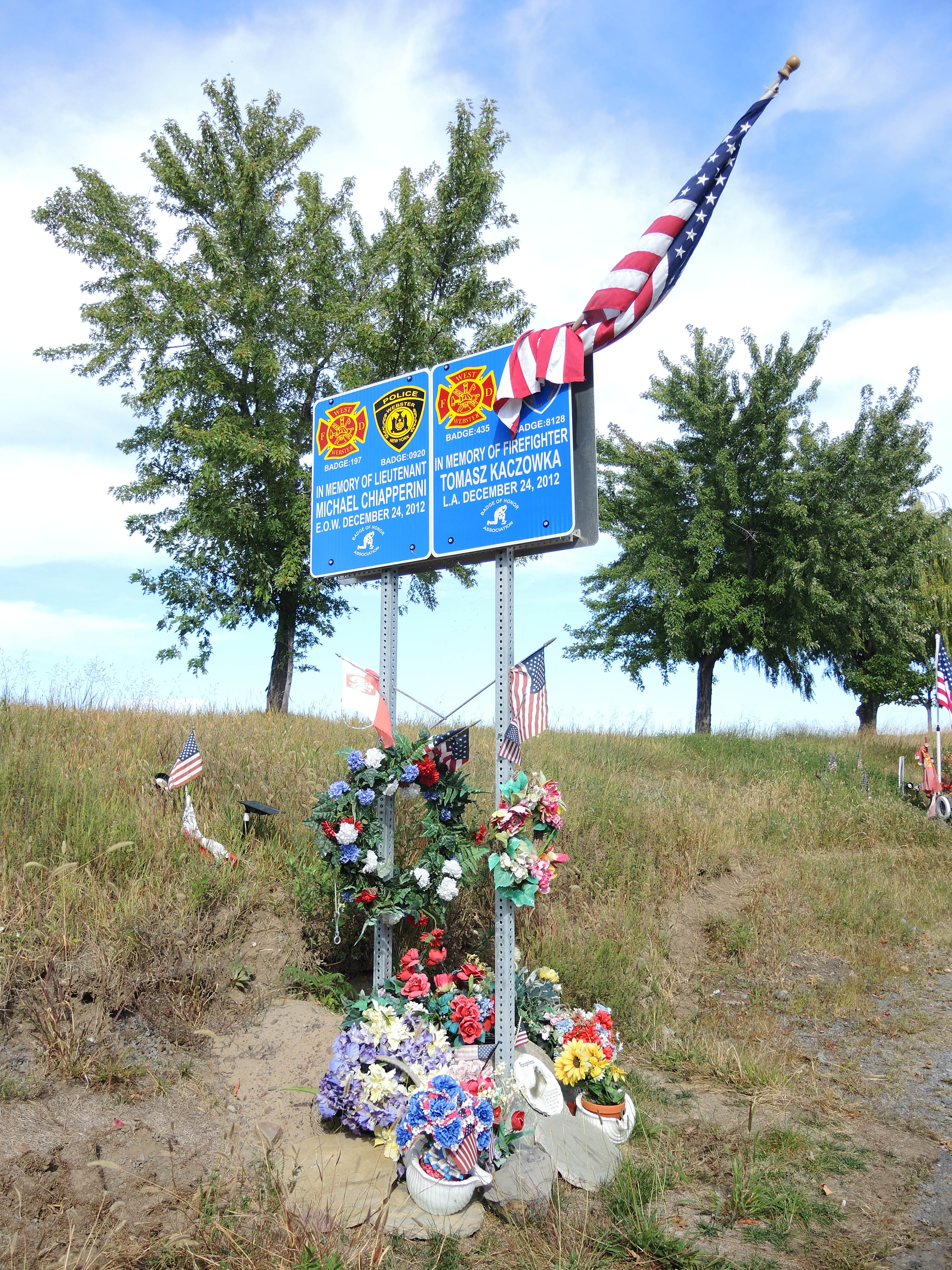
- Memorial for Michael Chiapperini and Tomasz Kaczowka
- Location: 43°14′13″N 77°31′22″W; 191 Lake Road; Webster, New York, U.S.
- Date: December 24, 2012 c. 5:30 – c. 11:00 a.m. (EST)
- Attack type: Murder-suicide; arson; shootout; mass shooting
- Weapons: Bushmaster XM-15-E2S .223-caliber semi-automatic rifle; Smith & Wesson .38-caliber revolver; Mossberg 500 12-gauge pump-action shotgun
- Deaths: 4 (including the perpetrator)
- Injuries: 3
- Perpetrator: William H. Spengler Jr.

On December 24, 2012, an intentionally set house and vehicle fire was used to ambush first responders in Webster, New York, United States. The arsonist, 62-year-old William Spengler, shot at arriving firefighters and police officers, killing two and injuring three before committing suicide. He was found to have previously killed his sister, whose remains were found in the burned house.

The shooting, as well as the Sandy Hook shooting which occurred ten days prior, served as an impetus for the NY SAFE Act which added strong restrictions to the state's gun laws.

== Shooting ==
According to police, Spengler set his house on 191 Lake Road and the family car on fire in the early morning hours of Christmas Eve, and then armed himself with three guns: a Smith & Wesson .38-caliber revolver, a Mossberg 12-gauge shotgun, and a .223-caliber Bushmaster AR-15 style rifle. When firefighters arrived shortly after 5:30 a.m., Spengler ambushed them from an earthen berm across the street from his house. Two firefighters were killed, and two others were injured.

Spengler exchanged shots with police, who arrived with an armored truck to remove the firefighters and 33 nearby civilians. Spengler ran after getting shot at and died when he shot himself in the head. His body was discovered nearly six hours later. Due to the shooting, fire crews were unable to resume fighting the blaze until 11:30 a.m. By then, six other houses had burned to the ground, and two others had been rendered uninhabitable. Over 30 residents of the neighborhood were evacuated and kept warm on city buses.

The severely burned body of Spengler's 67-year-old sister Cheryl, with whom he was living, was found at the scene. A two-to-three-page typewritten letter written by Spengler was also found. It reflected Spengler's intent to ambush first responders, but offered no motive for the shooting. In it, he wrote, "I still have to get ready to see how much of the neighborhood I can burn down, and do what I like doing best, killing people."

=== Victims ===
The two firefighters killed in the shooting were 43-year-old Michael “Chip”Chiapperini, Past Chief of the West Webster Fire District and Lieutenant and public information officer for the Webster Police Department, and 19-year-old Tomasz Marian Kaczowka, who also worked as a 911 dispatcher. Chiapperini had three children, and his oldest son was also a firefighter in West Webster. He was the advisor of the Explorer Post, where he had met Kaczowska, and served as Kazowska’s mentor and close friend. Kaczowka was the youngest of three children and a first-generation Polish-American who was proud of his heritage. Chiapperini was shot once, and Kaczowka was shot twice.

The two wounded firefighters were Joseph Hofstetter, who was shot in the pelvis (with the bullet then lodged in his spine), and Theodore Scardino, who was shot in the chest and knee. Both were hospitalized at Strong Memorial Hospital for serious injuries, and were declared to be in stable condition. In addition to the two wounded firefighters, police officer Jon Ritter was slightly injured when a bullet hit the windshield of his car.

== Perpetrator ==
Police identified the gunman as 62-year-old local resident William H. Spengler Jr. (September 26, 1950 – December 24, 2012). Spengler previously spent 17 years in prison for murdering his 92-year-old grandmother Rose Spengler with a hammer in 1980. He was convicted of manslaughter for the crime. He had not attracted the attention of police since his release. William Spengler "could not stand" his sister Cheryl, according to a friend, Roger Vercruysse. Spengler's mother Arline, to whom he was said to have been close, died two months earlier.

Investigators immediately began focusing on how Spengler obtained the gun. New York, like nearly all other states, bars convicted felons from buying, owning or possessing a firearm. Before the day was out, agents with the Bureau of Alcohol, Tobacco and Firearms discovered that the Bushmaster rifle and the shotgun had been purchased in June 2010 at Gander Mountain in Henrietta, another Rochester suburb. The owner of record was Dawn Nguyen, a neighbor of Spengler, who had recently moved to the suburb of Greece. In an interview with agents that night, Nguyen admitted to buying the guns, but claimed they had then been stolen. However, according to investigators, Nguyen texted a Monroe County sheriff's deputy the next day and admitted buying the guns for Spengler in an illegal straw purchase. On December 28, William Hochul, the United States Attorney for the Western District of New York, announced that Nguyen had been arrested and charged with knowingly making a false statement in connection with the purchase of a firearm from a federal firearms licensee. She also faced state charges of filing a false business record—the form she filled out stating that she was the owner of the guns. Nguyen was sentenced to eight years in prison for her involvement in 2014 and was released to a halfway house in December 2020.

== Reactions ==
In a statement, New York Governor Andrew Cuomo said, "All of our thoughts and prayers go to the families and friends of those who were killed in this senseless act of violence." New York Attorney General Eric Schneiderman also said, "The contributions made by the fallen and injured officers in Webster will never be forgotten."

As part of the NY SAFE Act, the New York Penal Law section on aggravated murder was amended to increase penalties for murdering a first responder to life in prison without parole. The penalty increase was named the "Webster Provision" after the shooting.

== See also ==
- 2025 Coeur d'Alene shooting, another mass shooting where a fire was intentionally set to lure firefighters into an ambush
- Gun violence in the United States
