= New York State Rifle & Pistol Ass'n v. Bruen =

New York State Rifle & Pistol Association, Inc. v. Bruen
- Supreme Court of the United States

Argued November 3, 2021 Decided June 23, 2022
- Full case name: New York State Rifle & Pistol Association, Inc., et al. v. Kevin P. Bruen, in His Official Capacity as Superintendent of New York State Police, et al.
- Docket no.: 20-843
- Citations: 597 U.S. 1 (more) 142 S.Ct. 2111; 213 L. Ed. 2d 387; 2022 WL 2251305; 2022 U.S. LEXIS 3055
- Argument: Oral argument
- Decision: Opinion

Case history
- Prior: N.Y. State Rifle & Pistol Ass’n, Inc. v. Beach, No. 1:18-cv-00134-BKS-ATB, granting motion to dismiss (N.D.N.Y. 2018); N.Y. State Rifle & Pistol Ass’n, Inc. v. Beach, No. 19-00156, affirmed (2d Cir. 2020)

Holding
- The Second and Fourteenth Amendments protect an individual's right to carry a handgun for self-defense outside the home. New York’s proper-cause requirement violates the Fourteenth Amendment in that it prevents law-abiding citizens with ordinary self-defense needs from exercising their right to keep and bear arms in public for self-defense.

Court membership
- Chief Justice John Roberts Associate Justices Clarence Thomas · Stephen Breyer; Samuel Alito · Sonia Sotomayor; Elena Kagan · Neil Gorsuch; Brett Kavanaugh · Amy Coney Barrett

Case opinions
- Majority: Thomas, joined by Roberts, Alito, Gorsuch, Kavanaugh, Barrett
- Concurrence: Alito
- Concurrence: Kavanaugh, joined by Roberts
- Concurrence: Barrett
- Dissent: Breyer, joined by Sotomayor, Kagan

Laws applied
- U.S. Const. amends. II, XIV, Sullivan Act

New York State Rifle & Pistol Association, Inc. v. Bruen, 597 U.S. 1 (2022), abbreviated NYSRPA v. Bruen and also known as Bruen or NYSRPA II (to distinguish it from the 2020 case), is a landmark decision of the United States Supreme Court related to the Second Amendment to the United States Constitution. The case concerned the constitutionality of the 1911 Sullivan Act, a New York State law requiring applicants for a pistol concealed carry license to show "proper cause", or a special need distinguishable from that of the general public, in their application.

In a 6–3 decision issued in June 2022, the Supreme Court ruled that New York's law was unconstitutional and that the ability to bear arms in public was a constitutional right guaranteed by the Second Amendment. The Court ruled that states are allowed to enforce "shall-issue" permitting, where applicants for concealed carry permits must satisfy certain objective criteria, such as passing a background check, but that "may-issue" systems that use "arbitrary" evaluations of need made by local authorities are unconstitutional.

In the wake of Bruen, several lawsuits involving federal and states' gun regulations have been filed, their plaintiffs arguing that the judiciary should evaluate the regulation not in consideration of the public good, but in light of the "historical tradition of firearm regulation", a phrase penned by majority opinion author Justice Clarence Thomas. The Supreme Court's decision has been considered by some to be a dramatic expansion of its gun jurisprudence, and has been criticized by lower courts as unworkable. Others hold that the findings of Bruen reaffirm the precedent set by District of Columbia v. Heller and clarifies the framework with which lower courts are to decide Second Amendment cases. In June 2024, the Supreme Court ruled in United States v. Rahimi that federal laws restricting gun rights from those accused of domestic violence are constitutional, with the majority decision refining Bruen and stating that courts should not seek exact comparisons when applying the historical tradition test but rather look at similar analogues and general principles.

== Background ==
=== Prior Second Amendment case law ===
The issue around the right to carry guns in public in the United States has been a contested area in politics and constitutional law since the early 2000s. Prior to the case, the Supreme Court established two major decisions toward gun possession in one's home: District of Columbia v. Heller affirmed that U.S. citizens did have an individual right, unconnected to a "well-regulated militia", to possess guns within their own homes under the Second Amendment, and McDonald v. City of Chicago affirmed this was a right that was incorporated against the states. However, the question of ownership outside of one's home had not yet reached the Supreme Court, and instead was based on an inconsistent framework of state laws and federal court decisions. These decisions were generally rested on long-standing common law that the government does have the ability to regulate firearms in public spaces to uphold state regulations on public gun possession. Across more than one thousand cases since Heller, most federal appeals courts have used intermediate scrutiny rather than strict scrutiny to judge the validity of public-carry gun control laws which defer to the states' important interest to protect the public by restricting possession of guns in public spaces.

Since Heller and McDonald, the Supreme Court had been pressed by gun-rights advocates like the National Rifle Association to further review Second Amendment rights related to public possession of guns but the Court had passed on numerous cases that were presented. The case New York State Rifle & Pistol Association Inc. v. City of New York, which dealt with transporting guns out of New York City, had been accepted by the Supreme Court in 2019, but due to changes in the underlying law, the case was rendered moot.

=== Case background ===
To combat growing criminal violence in certain neighborhoods of New York City, including the assassination attempt on New York City mayor William J. Gaynor and the murder of author David Graham Phillips, Timothy Sullivan led the state legislature to enact the Sullivan Act in 1911. It made the possession of a handgun without a permit a crime, and instituted issuance of concealed carry permits at the discretion of local law enforcement. The law states that to obtain a permit, the applicant must "demonstrate a special need for self-protection distinguishable from that of the general community or of persons engaged in the same profession". The state had clarified that this must be a non-speculative need for self-defense as to establish a proper cause to grant a permit. The New York State Rifle and Pistol Association, along with Robert Nash and Brandon Koch, who failed to obtain a permit in New York state, challenged that law, seeking to make the issue of permits no longer discretionary. Nash, for example, sought a permit for a handgun after a string of robberies in his neighborhood but was denied as he could not prove a need for self-defense. The plaintiffs argued that the law and judgements against their permits were flawed; "Good, even impeccable, moral character plus a simple desire to exercise a fundamental right is, according to these courts, not sufficient. Nor is living or being employed in a 'high crime area.'" The Sullivan Act is considered the first may-issue public carry law in the United States, since the discretion on allowing a person to carry a gun in public is based on the evaluation of need, which seven other states adopted from New York. This is in contrast to more recent "shall-issue" licensing requirements based on determinant methods such as using background checks and aptitude checks to determine eligibility.

== Lower courts ==
The case, filed against then-Superintendent George P. Beach II of the New York State Police and Justice Richard J. McNally of the New York Supreme Court, was initially dismissed at the Northern District of New York in 2018. The plaintiffs appealed to the Second Circuit, which affirmed the dismissal by the District Court in August 2020. Beach was replaced by Keith M. Corlett in 2019; Corlett was replaced by Kevin P. Bruen in 2021, and Bruen was subsequently named as the defendant and respondent in the suit.

== Supreme Court ==
The petitioners had asked the Supreme Court to review their case, specifically pressing the question of "whether the Second Amendment allows the government to prohibit ordinary law-abiding citizens from carrying handguns outside the home for self-defense". The Supreme Court granted certiorari on April 26, 2021, though it limited the case to the question of "whether the State’s denial of petitioners’ applications for concealed-carry licenses for self-defense violated the Second Amendment". The case was heard on November 3, 2021. The petitioners were represented by Paul Clement, who served as solicitor general during the administration of George W. Bush and argued as amicus curiae on behalf of the United States in Heller, and on behalf of the National Rifle Association in support of the petitioners in McDonald. The respondents were represented by New York State Solicitor General Barbara Underwood, who served in the Solicitor General's Office during the administration of Bill Clinton and temporarily served as acting Solicitor General of the United States between the transition from Clinton to Bush.

The case was the first major gun-rights case that the Supreme Court had heard in more than a decade, outside of the moot New York State Rifle & Pistol Association Inc. v. City of New York. It was also the first gun-rights case to be heard by the six-member conservative majority, which included Justices Clarence Thomas, Neil Gorsuch and Brett Kavanaugh, who in prior opinions had emphasized the need for the Supreme Court to review the current stance on Second Amendment cases. Justice Amy Coney Barrett had also expressed support for a Second Amendment review prior to her appointment to the Supreme Court. Because of the shift toward a more-conservative membership, some court analysts believed that the Court might interpret the Second Amendment more liberally in favor of individual rights over states' powers, which could render many existing public-possession regulations unconstitutional. However, as discussed by Vox's Ian Millhiser, the limited question that the Court granted may restrict the issue to concealed-carry licenses and not the matter of any and all public possession.

=== Amicus briefs ===
More than eighty amicus briefs for this case were filed.

==== Discrimination and marginalized groups ====
Organizations representing American minority groups submitted amicus briefs in support of striking down much of the Sullivan Act as unconstitutional. The Bronx Defenders, Brooklyn Defenders Services, and Black Attorneys of Legal Aid argued that the Second Amendment is a "legal fiction" in New York when it comes to people of color. According to these public defender and legal aid organizations, some 96% of those arrested for illegal gun possession in New York during 2020 were either Black or Latino. The disparate racial impact of the Sullivan Act and other discretionary New York state gun control regulations is "no accident" according to their brief provided to the Court. Black Guns Matter, A Girl & A Gun Women's Shooting League, and Armed Equality, an LGBT self-defense group, voiced a similar opinion to the Court in their own amicus brief, calling may-issue "deeply discriminatory". A group of retired New York State Supreme Court judges mostly of Italian descent and a group of Italo-American New York attorneys were the amici curiae in a brief entitled, Italo-American Jurists and Attorneys in Support of Petitioners. This brief describes the anti-Italian immigrant bias of the Sullivan Act and cites numerous sources, which support such a conclusion. This brief and the anti-Italian sentiment of the Sullivan Act were referenced by Justice Alito during oral argument.

==== Weakness of "proper cause" ====
Twenty-six state attorneys general argued that the subjective nature of the proper-cause test "fails muster under any level of scrutiny" because it required license applicants to prove they "have already become victims of violent crimes" before they could carry a firearm to protect themselves against that very violence from occurring in the first place.

Black Guns Matter opined the proper-cause requirement had no objective standards, and therefore lent itself to discriminatory usage in practice.

==== History and precedent ====
A group of Republican lawyers including J. Michael Luttig, Peter Keisler, and Stuart M. Gerson argued that text, history, tradition, and precedent make it clear that states may restrict concealed carry and pass legislation to reduce gun violence in public.

The gun control and safety organization Everytown for Gun Safety provided post-Civil War historical precedents and critical analysis of the challengers' citations, writing "To set aside the body of historical evidence in this case, while claiming the mantle of originalism, would only serve to diminish [originalism] — reducing the methodology to little more than an exercise in picking out one's friends in a crowd of historical sources."

=== Opinion of the Court ===
The case's decision was released on June 23, 2022. In a 6–3 opinion authored by Justice Clarence Thomas, the Court held that the state law was unconstitutional as it infringed on the right to keep and bear arms, reversing the Second Circuit's decision and remanding the case for further review.

Thomas' majority opinion, joined by Chief Justice John Roberts and Justices Samuel Alito, Neil Gorsuch, Brett Kavanaugh, and Amy Coney Barrett, effectively rendered public carry a constitutional right under the Second Amendment. Thomas wrote, "The constitutional right to bear arms in public for self-defense is not 'a second-class right, subject to an entirely different body of rules than the other Bill of Rights guarantees.' We know of no other constitutional right that an individual may exercise only after demonstrating to government officers some special need."

Because public carry is a constitutional right, Thomas ruled out use of the two-part test to evaluate state gun laws, which generally involved application of intermediate scrutiny, that many lower courts had used, and instead evaluated New York's law under the text-and-history standard from Heller, which asks whether the proper-cause requirement is consistent with the nation's historical tradition of firearm regulation. Thomas wrote that gun control laws that identify restricted "sensitive places", such as courthouses and polling places, would still likely pass constitutional muster, though urban areas would not qualify as such sensitive places.

After striking down the two-step test (formerly used by Courts of Appeals addressing Second Amendment issues), Bruen reiterated the text-and-history standard from Heller that courts must use on Second Amendment cases. The Court held: "When the Second Amendment's plain text covers an individual's conduct [here the right to bear arms], the Constitution presumptively protects that conduct. The government must then justify its regulation by demonstrating that it is consistent with the Nation's historical tradition of firearm regulation. Only then may a court conclude that the individual's conduct falls outside the Second Amendment's 'unqualified command.'"

Under that standard, New York had the burden of showing that its proper-cause requirement fit the nation's tradition of firearm regulation. New York pointed to historical sources from the late 1200s to the early 1900s, which the Court sorted into five periods. They were medieval to early modern England, the American Colonies and the early Republic, antebellum America, Reconstruction, and the late 19th and early 20th centuries. The Court concluded that the record showed rules on why and how people carried arms. Apart from a few late-19th-century outliers, the Court found no tradition of banning public carry or limiting carry to people who show a special need.

The most prominent medieval English law that New York and its amici cited was the 1328 Statute of Northampton. It barred going or riding armed with some exceptions. The Court wrote that the statute as understood in the Middle Ages "has little bearing" on the Second Amendment adopted in 1791. It said the statute appeared to be centrally concerned with the wearing of armor. Handguns did not appear in Europe until about the mid-1500s. New York also cited Sir John Knight's Case of 1686. Chief Justice Holt said that the statute had "almost gone in desuetudinem" (fallen into disuse). The Court read his opinion to limit the statute to carrying with evil intent. The Court found the English history "ambiguous at best."

==== Concurrence ====
Justice Kavanaugh penned a concurring opinion, joined by Chief Justice Roberts, affirming states may still implement licensing requirements such as background checks before issuing public carry permits. Kavanaugh wrote that these checks differ from the New York law as that law "grants open-ended discretion to licensing officials and authorizes licenses only for those applicants who can show some special need apart from self-defense." Kavanaugh quoted from Justice Antonin Scalia's majority opinion in Heller, stating that "nothing in our opinion, should be taken to cast doubt on longstanding prohibitions on the possession of firearms by felons and the mentally ill, or laws forbidding the carrying of firearm in sensitive places such as schools and government buildings, or laws imposing conditions and qualifications on the commercial sale of arms."

==== Dissent ====
Justice Stephen Breyer wrote the dissenting opinion, joined by Justices Sonia Sotomayor and Elena Kagan. Breyer led his dissent by referring to the amount of gun violence in the United States, including listing several major mass shootings from the months prior. He then wrote that "New York's Legislature considered the empirical evidence about gun violence and adopted a reasonable licensing law to regulate the concealed carriage of handguns in order to keep the people of New York safe", and that the majority decision established a new framework for courts to use in Second Amendments cases that would harm states' abilities to regulate guns. He concluded that "when courts interpret the Second Amendment, it is constitutionally proper, indeed often necessary, for them to consider the serious dangers and consequences of gun violence that lead States to regulate firearms".

==== Criticism of dissent ====
Justice Alito wrote a separate concurrence to the majority, in which he criticized Breyer's dissent, stating, "It is hard to see what legitimate purpose can possibly be served by most of the dissent's lengthy introductory section ... Much of the dissent seems designed to obscure the specific question that the Court has decided." Dismissing Breyer's concern on a new legal framework for Second Amendment cases, Alito wrote, "Our holding decides nothing about who may lawfully possess a firearm or the requirements that must be met to buy a gun." Justice Alito also questioned whether a person bent on committing an atrocity such as a mass shooting would be deterred because it would be illegal for him to carry a firearm outside of his home. Alito further pointed out that the recent shooting rampage in Buffalo occurred in New York, and New York's law had done nothing to stop the perpetrator.

== Impact ==
While the ruling directly applied only to New York's law, legal analysts and lawmakers expected the ruling to be used to challenge the "may-issue" gun regulations in California, Hawaii, Maryland, Massachusetts, New Jersey, and Rhode Island. Lawmakers in New York and these states began evaluating new regulations that would comply with the Supreme Court ruling while maintaining strict ownership laws.

On June 24, 2022, the Acting Attorney General of New Jersey, Matthew J. Platkin, concluded that Bruen disallowed the state from requiring concealed carry permit applicants to demonstrate a justifiable need to carry a handgun and directed law enforcement and prosecutors to process applications on a shall-issue basis. The Attorneys General of California and Hawaii issued similar directives.

Within months of the ruling of Bruen, several existing and new lawsuits challenging federal and state firearms regulations pressed on the language of "historical tradition of firearm regulation" that was introduced in Thomas' majority opinion, and to ignore the traditional metric of whether the restriction serves the public good. Among federal laws that have been blocked from enforcement as of February 2023 include those that prevented gun ownership from those convicted of misdemeanor domestic violence, individuals subject to final (issued after a hearing of which the respondent had notice and at which the respondent had the opportunity to appear) domestic violence restraining orders, felony defendants, and drug users. Further, federal bans on gun possession within post offices have also been blocked. These decisions have been praised by Second Amendment activists but criticized by those fighting for stronger gun control in the U.S. The interpretations of Bruen have been considered varied by judges and legal scholars, since interpreting the "historical tradition" requires judges to understand how the framers of the Constitution envisioned gun ownership in the 18th century. By 2024, the number of gun cases heard annually since Bruen rose to 680, compared with 74 in the decade prior to the decision.

Following Bruen, the Supreme Court used the idea of "history and tradition" in other major rulings, including in Dobbs v. Jackson Women's Health Organization, which overturned Roe v. Wade to eliminate the federal right to abortion, and in Kennedy v. Bremerton School District which favored religious expression over separation of church and state. While making rulings that hold to the ideals of the Constitution as it had been written was a tenet of originalism championed by former Justice Antonin Scalia, these rulings were seen by legal scholars as a different approach to interpreting the constitution and would allow for judges to pick and choose what part of the historical record to make rulings to their liking. Both liberals and conservative groups expressed concerns with this approach, which also weakened the Due Process Clause within the Fourteenth Amendment to support contemporary rights and liberties not expressly documented in the Constitution.

Criticism of Bruen's decision was raised during the Court's review of United States v. Rahimi in the 2023 term, which dealt with federal laws blocking gun ownership by those that have been placed on domestic violence restrictions. Arguments made in support of upholding the federal gun laws argued that the Bruen test of "historic tradition" exposes the absurdity of judging constitutionality by weighing by whether similar laws existed when the Second Amendment was ratified in 1791. The Supreme Court upheld the validity of the federal law in June 2024 with Roberts, writing for the majority, stating that disarming persons that are dangerous to others falls within the historic tradition of the nation, as well as clarified how Bruen should be used in such cases. Thomas, writing the sole dissent, argued that the majority had not followed the strict standards set by Bruen.

=== Lower court challenges ===
At least three lower courts have issued rulings that directly challenge Bruen. In August 2023, the Supreme Court of Illinois upheld the state's 2023 law that banned several "high-power" weapons. Gun rights advocates challenged the same Illinois law in federal district court, on appeal the Seventh Circuit, declined to put an injunction against the law while litigation proceeded, stating in their ruling that "There is a long tradition, unchanged from the time when the Second Amendment was added to the Constitution, supporting a distinction between weapons and accessories designed for military or law-enforcement use and weapons designed for personal use". The U.S. Supreme Court did not intercede to issue an injunction in December 2023.

In a second case, the Supreme Court of Hawaii upheld a state requirement for having a permit to carry a gun in public, ruling that the recent decision of Bruen and other gun rights cases by the U.S. Supreme Court since Heller have turned against the "militia-centric" reading of the Second Amendment, and that "states retain the authority to require individuals have a license before carrying firearms in public".

The Supreme Court of Pennsylvania ruled to uphold a local regulation on where firearms may be used. The majority opinion stated the local regulation "is fully consistent with this nation's historical tradition of firearm regulation" as several examples of such regulations "demonstrate a sustained and wide-ranging effort by municipalities, cities, and states of all stripes – big, small, urban, rural, Northern, Southern, etc. – to regulate a societal problem that has persisted since the birth of the nation."

Bruen has also been used to challenge restrictions on other weapons besides guns. Prior to Bruen, Judge Roger T. Benitez of the United States District Court for the Southern District of California had upheld the state's ban on billy clubs, but on a subsequent challenge, ruled the state failed to demonstrate a historical prevalence for their law. The Ninth Circuit struck down Hawaii's ban on switchblade knives in February 2024, arguing there was no historical precedent for such a ban. Similarly, in August 2024, the Massachusetts Supreme Judicial Court relied on Bruen when it struck down a statewide 1957 ban on switchblade knives in the state, on the grounds there were no similar bans at the time of the writing of the Second and Fourteenth Amendments.

== Reactions ==
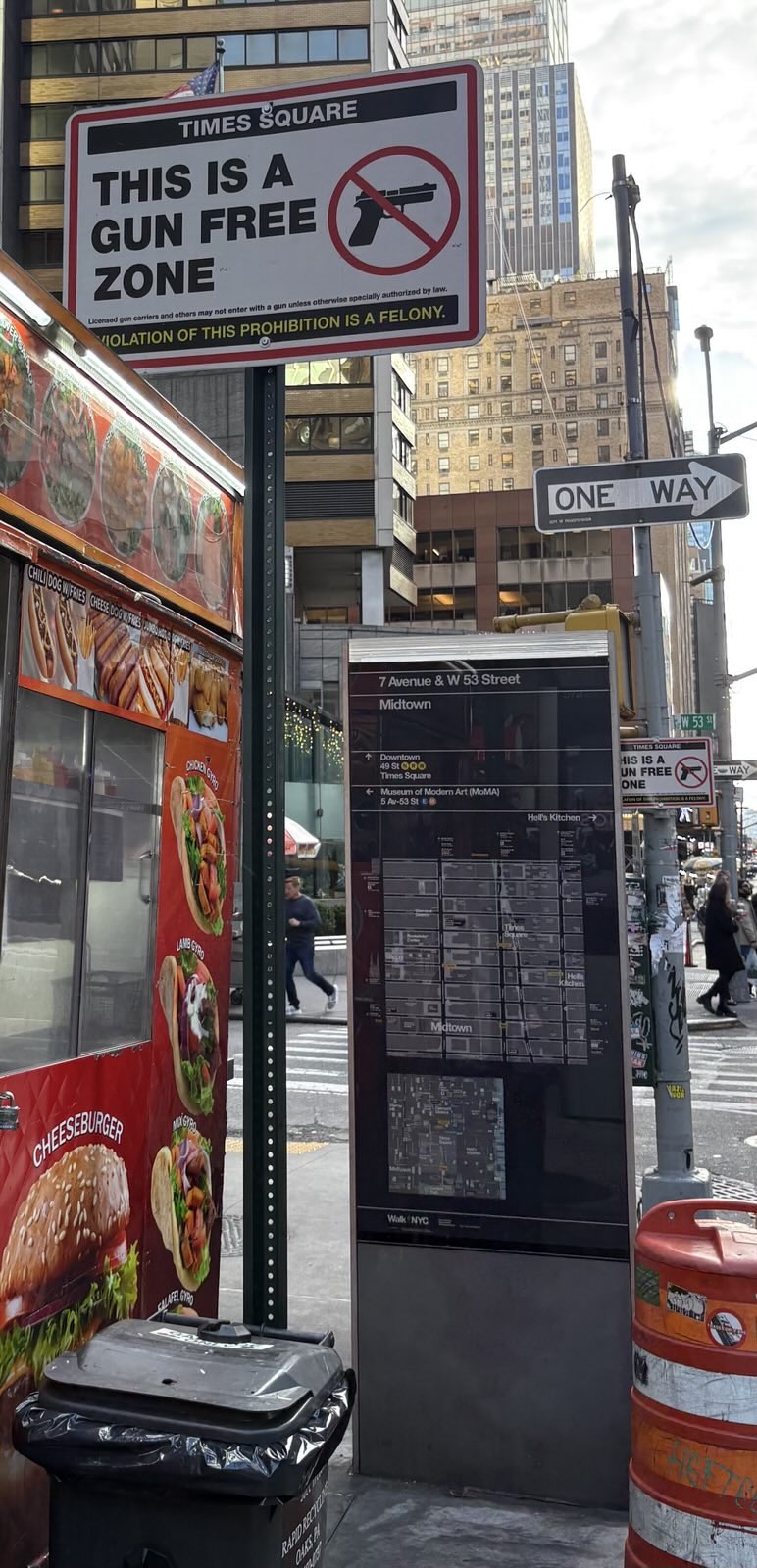
Following the 6–3 majority Bruen decision of 2022, in which the Supreme Court held that the individual right to keep and bear arms extended to a right to carry a firearm in public, more restrictive areas of the United States including New York City began posting signs such as this one in an attempt to make the mere carrying of a firearm a felony criminal offense in large public areas, dubbed "sensitive locations" including Times Square.

The Governor of New York, Kathy Hochul (D‑NY), called the decision by the court "frightening" and said it "strips away the state's right to protect its citizens". She also criticized the decision as "reckless" and "reprehensible". By July 1, 2022, Hochul signed a revised Concealed Carry Improvement Act (CCIA) into law with restrictions on public possession of guns based on the decision from Bruen. The new law removes the old "may-issue" standard that had been challenged, but adds new requirements including classroom training and a background check of the applicant's social media posts for any red flags. In addition, the law prohibits guns from being carried in sensitive locations that include polling places, schools, and churches, and well as New York's tourist attractions like Times Square. The law came into effect on September 1, 2022; an initial lawsuit seeking to block enforcement of the law was thrown out due to lack of standing though federal judge Glenn Suddaby did agree the new law may be unconstitutional under the Bruen decision. A second lawsuit, filed by citizens that belonged to Gun Owners of America, led Judge Suddaby to grant an injunction on the law on October 6, 2022, stating that the law's full list of locations where public carry was banned was likely indefensible, though the state filed an emergency appeal to the Second Circuit. The Second Circuit lifted the injunction, allowing the law to be enforced, and ruled the bulk of the law was constitutional in December 2023. The U.S. Supreme Court vacated the ruling in July 2024 via order, stating the Second Circuit did not properly apply Bruen to its decision, leaving the law blocked from enforcement. On rehearing, the Second Circuit still upheld key parts of the law regulating concealed carry in public places, while striking down others, in October 2024; the Supreme Court declined to take up the challenge to this ruling.

Separately, New York City passed a bill on October 11, 2022, that designated Times Square as a sensitive location where public possession of a gun would be unlawful.

The Legal Aid Society said the decision "may be an affirmative step toward ending arbitrary licensing standards that have inhibited lawful Black and Brown gun ownership in New York."

House minority Leader Kevin McCarthy (R‑CA) supported the ruling, saying it "rightfully ensures the right of all law-abiding Americans to defend themselves without unnecessary government interference."

Law professor Steve Vladeck said the decision will "have monumental ramifications far beyond carrying firearms in public" and predicts there will be a "slew of litigation challenging any and every gun-control measure".

Dudley Brown, president of the National Association for Gun Rights, commented on the ramifications of the Bruen decision in a May 2023 New York Times article. "Dudley Brown, the president of the National Association for Gun Rights, which opposes any restrictions on gun ownership, said the Bruen decision was a bulwark against regulation and would help his organization win a host of lawsuits against gun restrictions. But he said that even with the Bruen ruling, a monumental victory in the Supreme Court, the fight would be playing out for years in state legislatures and lower courts that now have to interpret the decision. 'It often feels like one step forward, two steps back,' he said."

A 2022 poll found that 64% of Americans were in favor of the ruling in contrast with 35% of Americans that say they oppose the decision. Additionally, 36%, the largest single share, said they strongly support the Court's ruling in contrast with 16% who said they strongly oppose it.
