= Silveira v. Lockyer =

- Court: United States Court of Appeals for the Ninth Circuit
- Argued: February 15, 2002
- Decided: December 5, 2002
- Citation: 312 F.3d 1052 (9th Cir. 2002)

Case history
- Subsequent history: Amended January 27, 2003; Rehearing en banc denied, 328 F.3d 567 (9th Cir. 2003)

Court membership
- Judges sitting: Stephen Reinhardt, Frank J. Magill (8th Cir.), Raymond C. Fisher

Case opinions
- Majority: Reinhardt, joined by Fisher
- Concurrence: Magill

Laws applied
- Second Amendment
- Abrogated by
- District of Columbia v. Heller, 554 US 570 (2008)

Silveira v. Lockyer, 312 F.3d 1052 (9th Cir. 2002), was a decision by the United States Court of Appeals for the Ninth Circuit ruling that the Second Amendment to the United States Constitution did not guarantee individuals the right to bear arms. The case involved a challenge to the constitutionality of the Roberti-Roos Assault Weapons Control Act of 1989 (AWCA), California legislation that banned the manufacture, sale, transportation, or importation of specified semi-automatic firearms. The plaintiffs alleged that various provisions of the AWCA infringed upon their individual constitutionally-guaranteed right to keep and bear arms.

Judge Stephen R. Reinhardt wrote the opinion of the three-member panel. The court engaged in an extensive analysis of the history of the Second Amendment and its attendant case law. The court concluded that the Second Amendment did not guarantee individuals the right to keep and bear arms. Instead, the court concluded that the Second Amendment provides "collective" rights, which is limited to the arming of state militia. The opinion initially cited Michael Bellesiles, the historian who earlier in 2002 had resigned under pressure from Emory University and been stripped of his Bancroft Prize by Columbia University for using fabricated research arguing that during the early period of US history, guns were uncommon during peacetime and that a culture of gun ownership did not arise until the mid-nineteenth century; on January 27, 2003, Judge Reinhardt deleted the citation to Bellesiles and substituted research by political scientist Earl Kruschke in its place.

The Ninth Circuit refused to hear the case en banc but issued a set of dissenting opinions to the denial to take the case en banc, which included a notable opinion by Judge Alex Kozinski. The U.S. Supreme Court denied review, despite the decision conflicting with the holding of the Fifth Circuit in United States v. Emerson.

In the U.S. Supreme Court case of District of Columbia v. Heller, the opinion in Silveira v. Lockyer was abrogated. The Supreme Court held in Heller that the right to keep and bear arms is a right of individuals. The Supreme Court also later held in McDonald v. Chicago, in 2010, that the Second Amendment is an incorporated right, meaning that it is applicable to state governments and to the federal government.

== See also ==
- Firearm case law in the United States
