= United States v. Emerson =

2001 U.S. circuit court decision related to the right to bear arms

- Court: United States Court of Appeals for the Fifth Circuit
- Decided: October 16, 2001
- Citation: 270 F.3d 203

Case history
- Subsequent history: Opinion revised, November 2, 2001; Cert. denied, 536 U.S. 907 (2002)

Court membership
- Judges sitting: William Lockhart Garwood, Harold R. DeMoss Jr., Robert Manley Parker

Case opinions
- Majority: Garwood, joined by DeMoss, Parker (Parts I-IV)
- Concurrence: Parker

Laws applied
- U.S. Const. amend. II

United States v. Emerson, 270 F.3d 203 (5th Cir. 2001), cert. denied, 536 U.S. 907 (2002), is a decision by the United States Court of Appeals for the Fifth Circuit holding that the Second Amendment to the United States Constitution guarantees individuals the right to bear arms. The case involved a challenge to the Constitutionality of 18 U.S.C. § 922(g)(8)(C)(ii), a federal statute that prohibited the transportation of firearms or ammunition in interstate commerce by persons subject to a court order whose explicit terms prohibits the use of physical force against an intimate partner or child.

The Fifth Circuit engaged in an extensive analysis of the text and history of the Second Amendment and its attendant case law, including many state supreme court decisions, and ultimately determined that the Second Amendment "protects the right of individuals to privately" keep and bear arms. Nonetheless, the court held that the particular deprivation of the right to bear arms in the case before it did not violate the Constitution, and it also acknowledged the federal government's sharp limitations on disarming of individual Americans. The U.S. Supreme Court denied certiorari to review of the Fifth Circuit's decision.

In 2002, the Ninth Circuit disagreed with Emerson in Silveira v. Lockyer. In 2008, the United States Court of Appeals for the District of Columbia Circuit held that the Second Amendment protects an individual right in Parker v. District of Columbia, which was reviewed by the Supreme Court of the United States in District of Columbia v. Heller. The Supreme Court ruled in its decision that the Second Amendment "protects an individual right to keep and bear arms."

In McDonald v. Chicago, the Supreme Court incorporated the Second Amendment against the states by ruling that the right to keep and bear arms is an individual right. That mooted the questions that had remained in Nordyke v. King.

== See also ==
- Firearms case law
