= Second Amendment to the United States Constitution =

1791 amendment protecting the right to keep and bear arms

The Second Amendment (Amendment II) to the United States Constitution protects the right to keep and bear arms. It was ratified on December 15, 1791, along with nine other articles of the United States Bill of Rights. In District of Columbia v. Heller (2008), the Supreme Court affirmed that the right belongs to individuals, for self-defense in the home, while also including, as dicta, that the right is not unlimited and does not preclude the existence of certain long-standing prohibitions such as those forbidding "the possession of firearms by felons and the mentally ill" or restrictions on "the carrying of dangerous and unusual weapons". In McDonald v. City of Chicago (2010) the Supreme Court ruled that state and local governments are limited to the same extent as the federal government from infringing upon this right. New York State Rifle & Pistol Association, Inc. v. Bruen (2022) assured the right to carry weapons in public spaces with certain exceptions.

The Second Amendment was based partially on the right to keep and bear arms in English common law and was influenced by the English Bill of Rights 1689. Sir William Blackstone described this right as an auxiliary right, supporting the natural rights of self-defense and resistance to oppression, and the civic duty to act in concert in defense of the state. While both James Monroe and John Adams supported the Constitution being ratified, its most influential framer was James Madison. In Federalist No. 46, Madison wrote how a federal army could be kept in check by the militia, "a standing army ... would be opposed [by] militia." He argued that State governments "would be able to repel the danger" of a federal army, "It may well be doubted, whether a militia thus circumstanced could ever be conquered by such a proportion of regular troops." He contrasted the federal government of the United States to the European kingdoms, which he described as "afraid to trust the people with arms", and assured that "the existence of subordinate governments ... forms a barrier against the enterprises of ambition".

By January 1788, Delaware, Pennsylvania, New Jersey, Georgia and Connecticut ratified the Constitution without insisting upon amendments. Several amendments were proposed, but were not adopted at the time the Constitution was ratified. For example, the Pennsylvania convention debated fifteen amendments, one of which concerned the right of the people to be armed, another with the militia. The Massachusetts convention also ratified the Constitution with an attached list of proposed amendments. In the end, the ratification convention was so evenly divided between those for and against the Constitution that the federalists agreed to the Bill of Rights to assure ratification. In United States v. Cruikshank (1876), the Supreme Court ruled that, "The right to bear arms is not granted by the Constitution; neither is it in any manner dependent upon that instrument for its existence. The Second Amendments [sic] means no more than that it shall not be infringed by Congress, and has no other effect than to restrict the powers of the National Government." In United States v. Miller (1939), the Supreme Court ruled that the Second Amendment did not protect weapon types not having a "reasonable relationship to the preservation or efficiency of a well regulated militia".

In the 21st century, the amendment has been subjected to renewed academic inquiry and judicial interest. In District of Columbia v. Heller (2008), the Supreme Court handed down a landmark decision that held the amendment protects an individual's right to keep a gun for self-defense. This was the first time the Court had ruled that the Second Amendment guarantees an individual's right to own a gun. In McDonald v. Chicago (2010), the Supreme Court clarified that the Due Process Clause of the Fourteenth Amendment incorporated the Second Amendment against state and local governments. In Caetano v. Massachusetts (2016), the Supreme Court reiterated its earlier rulings that "the Second Amendment extends, prima facie, to all instruments that constitute bearable arms, even those that were not in existence at the time of the founding," and that its protection is not limited only to firearms, nor "only those weapons useful in warfare." In addition to affirming the right to carry firearms in public, New York State Rifle & Pistol Association, Inc. v. Bruen (2022) created a new test that laws seeking to limit Second Amendment rights must be based on the history and tradition of gun rights, although the test was refined to focus on similar analogues and general principles rather than strict matches from the past in United States v. Rahimi (2024). The debate between various organizations regarding gun control and gun rights continues.

== Text ==
There are several versions of the text of the Second Amendment, each with capitalization or punctuation differences. Differences exist between the version passed by Congress and put on display and the versions ratified by the states. These differences have been a focus of debate regarding the meaning of the amendment, particularly regarding the importance of what the courts have called the prefatory clause.

The final, handwritten original of the Bill of Rights as passed by Congress, with the rest of the original prepared by scribe William Lambert, is preserved in the National Archives. This is the version ratified by Delaware and used by the Supreme Court in District of Columbia v. Heller:

A well regulated Militia, being necessary to the security of a free State, the right of the people to keep and bear Arms, shall not be infringed.

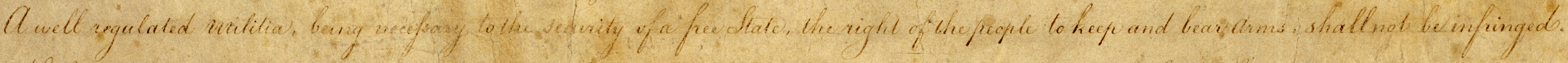

Some state-ratified versions, such as Maryland's, omitted the first or final commas:

A well regulated Militia being necessary to the security of a free State, the right of the people to keep and bear Arms, shall not be infringed.

The ratification acts from New York, Pennsylvania, Rhode Island, and South Carolina contained only one comma, but with differences in capitalization. Pennsylvania's act states:

A well regulated Militia being necessary to the security of a free State, the right of the people to keep and bear Arms shall not be infringed.

The ratification act from New Jersey has no commas:

A well regulated Militia being necessary to the security of a free State the right of the people to keep and bear Arms shall not be infringed.

== Pre-Constitution background ==
=== Influence of the English Bill of Rights of 1689 ===
The right of Protestants to bear arms in English history is regarded in English common law as a subordinate auxiliary right of the primary rights to personal security, personal liberty, and private property. According to Sir William Blackstone, "The ... last auxiliary right of the subject ... is that of having arms for their defence, suitable to their condition and degree, and such as are allowed by law. Which is ... declared by ... statute, and is indeed a public allowance, under due restrictions, of the natural right of resistance and self-preservation, when the sanctions of society and laws are found insufficient to restrain the violence of oppression."

The English Bill of Rights of 1689 emerged from a tempestuous period in English politics during which two issues were major sources of conflict: the authority of the king to govern without the consent of Parliament, and the role of Catholics in a country with a staunchly Protestant majority. Ultimately, the Catholic James II was overthrown in the Glorious Revolution, and his successors, the Protestants William III and Mary II, accepted the conditions that were codified in the bill. One of the issues the bill resolved was the authority of the king to disarm his subjects, after James II had disarmed many Protestants that were "suspected or knowne" of disliking the government, and had argued with Parliament over his desire to maintain a standing (or permanent) army. (Note: From the English Civil War until the Glorious Revolution, militias occasionally disarmed Catholics, and the king, without parliament's consent, and likewise occasionally disarmed Protestants. See: Malcolm, "The Role of the Militia", pp. 139–151.) The bill states that it is acting to restore "ancient rights" trampled upon by James II, though some have argued that the English Bill of Rights created a new right to have arms, which developed out of a duty to have arms. In District of Columbia v. Heller (2008), the Supreme Court did not accept this view, remarking that the English right at the time of the passing of the English Bill of Rights was "clearly an individual right, having nothing whatsoever to do with service in the militia" and that it was a right not to be disarmed by the Crown and was not the granting of a new right to have arms.

The text of the English Bill of Rights of 1689 includes language protecting the right of Protestants against disarmament by the Crown, stating: "That the Subjects which are Protestants may have Arms for their Defence suitable to their Conditions and as allowed by Law." It also contained text that aspired to bind future Parliaments, though under English constitutional law no Parliament can bind any later Parliament.

The statement in the English Bill of Rights concerning the right to bear arms is often quoted only in the passage where it is written as above and not in its full context. In its full context it is clear that the bill was asserting the right of Protestant citizens not to be disarmed by the king without the consent of Parliament and was merely restoring rights to Protestants that the previous King briefly and unlawfully had removed. In its full context it reads:

Whereas the late King James the Second by the Assistance of diverse evil Councillors Judges and Ministers employed by him did endeavour to subvert and extirpate the Protestant Religion and the Laws and Liberties of this Kingdom (list of grievances including) ... by causing several good Subjects being Protestants to be disarmed at the same time when Papists were both Armed and employed contrary to Law, (Recital regarding the change of monarch) ... thereupon the said Lords Spiritual and Temporal and Commons pursuant to their respective Letters and Elections being now assembled in a full and free Representative of this Nation taking into their most serious Consideration the best means for attaining the Ends aforesaid Doe in the first place (as their Ancestors in like Case have usually done) for the Vindicating and Asserting their ancient Rights and Liberties, Declare (list of rights including) ... That the Subjects which are Protestants may have Arms for their Defense suitable to their Conditions and as allowed by Law.

The historical link between the English Bill of Rights and the Second Amendment, which both codify an existing right and do not create a new one, has been acknowledged by the U.S. Supreme Court. (Note: "This meaning is strongly confirmed by the historical background of the Second Amendment. We look to this because it has always been widely understood that the Second Amendment, like the First and Fourth Amendments, codified a pre-existing right. The very text of the Second Amendment implicitly recognizes the pre-existence of the right and declares only that it 'shall not be infringed'. As we (the United States Supreme Court) said in United States v. Cruikshank, 92 U.S. /542 /#553 542 , 553 (1876), '[t]his is not a right granted by the Constitution. Neither is it in any manner dependent upon that instrument for its existence. The Second amendment declares that it shall not be infringed ...' Between the Restoration and the Glorious Revolution, the Stuart Kings Charles II and James II succeeded in using select militias loyal to them to suppress political dissidents, in part by disarming their opponents. See J. Malcolm, To Keep and Bear Arms 31–53 (1994) (hereinafter Malcolm); L. Schwoerer, The Declaration of Rights, 1689, p. 76 (1981). Under the auspices of the 1671 Game Act, for example, the Catholic James II had ordered general disarmaments of regions home to his Protestant enemies. See Malcolm 103–06. These experiences caused Englishmen to be extremely wary of military forces run by the state (regulars) and to be jealous of their arms. They accordingly obtained an assurance from William and Mary, in the Declaration of Right (which was codified as the English Bill of Rights), that Protestants would never be disarmed: 'That the subjects which are Protestants may have arms for their defense suitable to their conditions and as allowed by law.' 1 W. & M., c. 2, §7, in 3 Eng. Stat. at Large 441 (1689). This right has long been understood to be the predecessor to our Second Amendment. See E. Dumbauld, The Bill of Rights and What It Means Today 51 (1957); W. Rawle, A View of the Constitution of the United States of America 122 (1825)" From the Opinion of the Court in District of Columbia versus Heller "District of Columbia v. Heller" (PDF). Archived from the original (PDF) on March 2, 2013.) (Note: Justice Antonin Scalia, wrote that "the right of the people to keep and bear Arms, shall not be infringed" was just a controlling one and referred to it as a pre-existing right of individuals to possess and carry personal weapons for self-defense and intrinsically for defense against tyranny. As with the English law "like most rights, the Second Amendment is not unlimited. It is not a right to keep and carry any weapon whatsoever in any manner whatsoever and for whatever purpose." "District of Columbia v. Heller" (PDF). Archived from the original (PDF) on March 2, 2013.)

The English Bill of Rights includes the proviso that arms must be as "allowed by law". This has been the case before and after the passage of the Bill. While it did not override earlier restrictions on the ownership of guns for hunting, it is subject to the parliamentary right to implicitly or explicitly repeal earlier enactments.

There is some difference of opinion as to how revolutionary the events of 1688–89 actually were, and several commentators make the point that the provisions of the English Bill of Rights did not represent new laws, but rather stated existing rights. Mark Thompson wrote that, apart from determining the succession, the English Bill of Rights did "little more than set forth certain points of existing laws and simply secured to Englishmen the rights of which they were already posessed [sic]." Before and after the English Bill of Rights, the government could always disarm any individual or class of individuals it considered dangerous to the peace of the realm. In 1765, Sir William Blackstone wrote the Commentaries on the Laws of England describing the right to have arms in England during the 18th century as a subordinate auxiliary right of the subject that was "also declared" in the English Bill of Rights.

The fifth and last auxiliary right of the subject, that I shall at present mention, is that of having arms for their defence, suitable to their condition and degree, and such as are allowed by law. Which is also declared by the same statute 1 W. & M. st.2. c.2. and is indeed a public allowance, under due restrictions, of the natural right of resistance and self-preservation, when the sanctions of society and laws are found insufficient to restrain the violence of oppression.

Although there is little doubt that the writers of the Second Amendment were heavily influenced by the English Bill of Rights, it is a matter of interpretation as to whether they were intent on preserving the power to regulate arms to the states over the federal government (as the English Parliament had reserved for itself against the monarch) or whether it was intent on creating a new right akin to the right of others written into the Constitution (as the Supreme Court decided in Heller). Some in the United States have preferred the "rights" argument arguing that the English Bill of Rights had granted a right. The need to have arms for self-defence was not really in question. Peoples all around the world since time immemorial had armed themselves for the protection of themselves and others, and as organized nations began to appear these arrangements had been extended to the protection of the state. (Note: E.g., King Henry II's Assize of Arms and the Statute of Winchester of 1285. See: "The history of policing in the West, Collective responsibility in early Anglo-Saxon times". Encyclopædia Britannica (online ed.). Archived from the original on June 7, 2009.) Without a regular army and police force, it had been the duty of certain men to keep watch and ward at night and to confront and capture suspicious persons. Every subject had an obligation to protect the king's peace and assist in the suppression of riots.

=== Influence of the British Militia Act 1757 ===
In 1757 Great Britain's Parliament created the Militia Act 1757 (30 Geo. 2. c. 25), "An Act for better ordering of the militia forces in the several counties of that part of Great Britain called England". This act declared that "a well-ordered and well-disciplined militia is essentially necessary to the safety, peace and prosperity of this kingdom," and that the current militia laws for the regulation of the militia were defective and ineffectual. Influenced by this act, in 1775 Timothy Pickering created "An Easy Plan of Discipline for a Militia". Greatly inhibited by the events surrounding Salem, Massachusetts, where the plan was printed, Pickering submitted the writing to George Washington. On May 1, 1776, the Massachusetts Bay Councell resolved that Pickering's discipline, a modification of the 1757 act, be the discipline of their Militia. On March 29, 1779, for members of the Continental Army this was replaced by Von Steuben's Regulations for the Order and Discipline of the Troops of the United States. With ratification of the Second Amendment, after May 8, 1792, the entire United States Militia, barring two declarations, would be regulated by Von Steuben's Discipline.

=== America before the U.S. Constitution ===
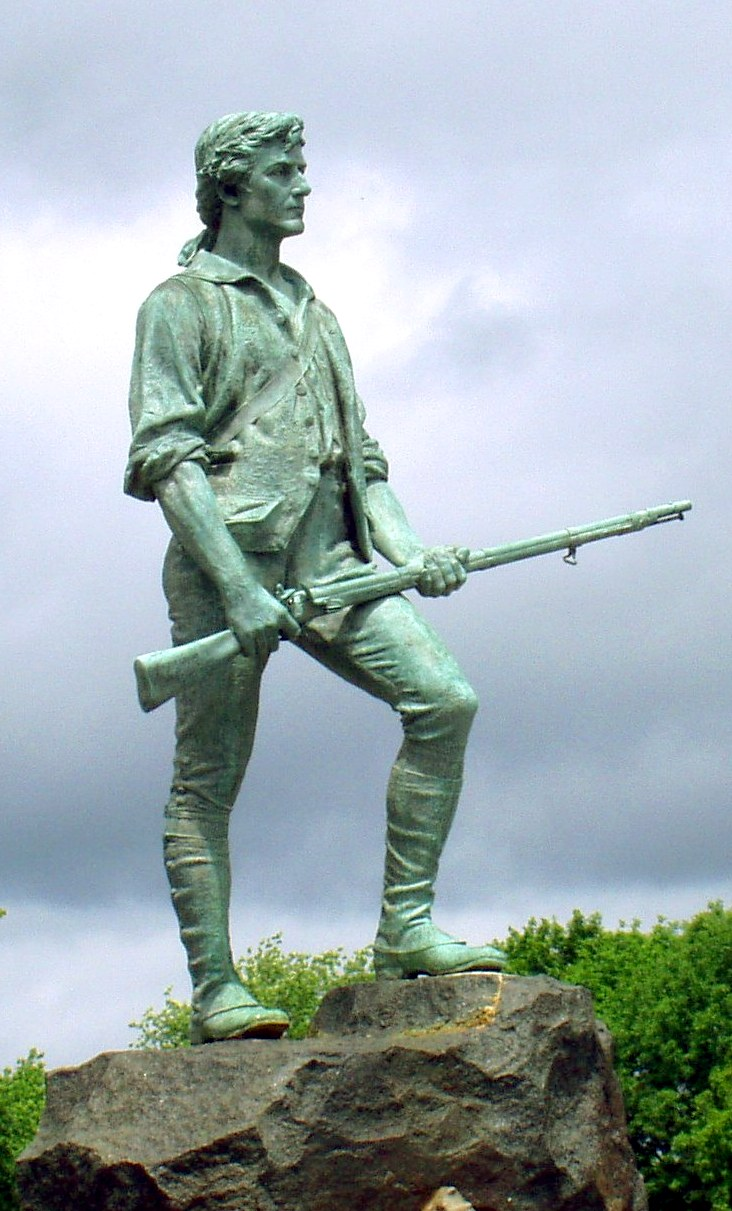
Ideals that helped to inspire the Second Amendment in part are symbolized by the minutemen.

King Charles I authorized the use of arms for special defense and safety, on land and at sea, against:

- destructive forces
- invasive forces
- detrimental forces
- annoying forces

The Military Company of Massachusetts had already ordered munition before the authorization was signed. Early Americans had other uses for arms, besides the uses King Charles had in mind: (Note: Hardy, p. 1237. "Early Americans wrote of the right in light of three considerations: (1) as auxiliary to a natural right of self-defense; (2) as enabling an armed people to deter undemocratic government; and (3) as enabling the people to organize a militia system.") (Note: Malcolm, "That Every Man Be Armed", pp. 452, 466. "The Second Amendment reflects traditional English attitudes toward these three distinct, but intertwined, issues: the right of the individual to protect his life, the challenge to government of an armed citizenry, and the preference for a militia over a standing army. The framers' attempt to address all three in a single declarative sentence has contributed mightily to the subsequent confusion over the proper interpretation of the Second Amendment.")

- safeguarding against tyrannical governments
- suppressing insurrection, allegedly including slave revolts, though professor Paul Finkelman has pointed out that the claim of a specific intent to protect the ability to put down slave revolts is not supported by the historical record
- facilitating a natural right of self-defense

Which of these considerations were thought of as most important and ultimately found expression in the Second Amendment is disputed. Some of these purposes were explicitly mentioned in early state constitutions; for example, the Pennsylvania Constitution of 1776 asserted that, "the people have a right to bear arms for the defence of themselves and the state."

During the 1760s pre-revolutionary period, the established colonial militia was composed of colonists, including many who were loyal to British rule. As defiance and opposition to British rule developed, a distrust of these Loyalists in the militia became widespread among the colonists known as Patriots, who favored independence from British rule. As a result, some Patriots created their own militias that excluded the Loyalists and then sought to stock independent armories for their militias. In response to this arms build-up, the British Parliament established an embargo of firearms, parts and ammunition against the American colonies which in some instance came to be referred to as Powder Alarms. King George III also began disarming individuals who were in the most rebellious areas in the 1760s and 1770s.

British and Loyalist efforts to disarm the colonial Patriot militia armories in the early phases of the American Revolution resulted in the Patriot colonists protesting by citing the Declaration of Right, Blackstone's summary of the Declaration of Right, their own militia laws and common law rights to self-defense. While British policy in the early phases of the Revolution clearly aimed to prevent coordinated action by the Patriot militia, some have argued that there is no evidence that the British sought to restrict the traditional common law right of self-defense. Patrick J. Charles disputes these claims citing similar disarming by the patriots and challenging those scholars' interpretation of Blackstone.

The right of the colonists to arms and rebellion against oppression was asserted, for example, in a pre-revolutionary newspaper editorial in 1769 objecting to the Crown suppression of colonial opposition to the Townshend Acts:

Instances of the licentious and outrageous behavior of the military conservators of the peace still multiply upon us, some of which are of such nature, and have been carried to such lengths, as must serve fully to evince that a late vote of this town, calling upon its inhabitants to provide themselves with arms for their defense, was a measure as prudent as it was legal: such violences are always to be apprehended from military troops, when quartered in the body of a populous city; but more especially so, when they are led to believe that they are become necessary to awe a spirit of rebellion, injuriously said to be existing therein. It is a natural right which the people have reserved to themselves, confirmed by the Bill of Rights, to keep arms for their own defence; and as Mr. Blackstone observes, it is to be made use of when the sanctions of society and law are found insufficient to restrain the violence of oppression.

The armed forces that won the American Revolution consisted of the standing Continental Army created by the Continental Congress, together with regular French army and naval forces and various state and regional militia units. In opposition, the British forces consisted of a mixture of the standing British Army, Loyalist militia and Hessian auxiliaries. Following the Revolution, the United States was governed by the Articles of Confederation. Federalists argued that this government had an unworkable division of power between Congress and the states, which caused military weakness, as the standing army was reduced to as few as 80 men. They considered it to be bad that there was no effective federal military crackdown on an armed tax rebellion in western Massachusetts known as Shays' Rebellion. Anti-federalists, on the other hand, took the side of limited government and sympathized with the rebels, many of whom were former Revolutionary War soldiers. Subsequently, the Constitutional Convention proposed in 1787 to grant Congress exclusive power to raise and support a standing army and navy of unlimited size. Anti-federalists objected to the shift of power from the states to the federal government, but as adoption of the Constitution became more and more likely, they shifted their strategy to establishing a bill of rights that would put some limits on federal power.

Modern scholars Thomas B. McAffee and Michael J. Quinlan have stated that James Madison "did not invent the right to keep and bear arms when he drafted the Second Amendment; the right was pre-existing at both common law and in the early state constitutions." In contrast, historian Jack Rakove suggests that Madison's intention in framing the Second Amendment was to provide assurances to moderate Anti-Federalists that the militias would not be disarmed.

One aspect of the gun control debate is the conflict between gun control laws and the right to rebel against unjust governments. Blackstone in his Commentaries alluded to this right to rebel as the natural right of resistance and self preservation, to be used only as a last resort, exercisable when "the sanctions of society and laws are found insufficient to restrain the violence of oppression". Some believe that the framers of the Bill of Rights sought to balance not just political power, but also military power, between the people, the states and the nation, as Alexander Hamilton explained in his "Concerning the Militia" essay published in 1788:

... it will be possible to have an excellent body of well-trained militia, ready to take the field whenever the defence of the State shall require it. This will not only lessen the call for military establishments, but if circumstances should at any time oblige the Government to form an army of any magnitude, that army can never be formidable to the liberties of the People, while there is a large body of citizens, little, if at all, inferior to them in discipline and the use of arms, who stand ready to defend their own rights, and those of their fellow-citizens. This appears to me the only substitute that can be devised for a standing army, and the best possible security against it, if it should exist.

There was an ongoing debate beginning in 1789 about "the people" fighting governmental tyranny (as described by Anti-Federalists); or the risk of mob rule of "the people" (as described by the Federalists) related to the increasingly violent French Revolution. A widespread fear, during the debates on ratifying the Constitution, was the possibility of a military takeover of the states by the federal government, which could happen if the Congress passed laws prohibiting states from arming citizens, (Note: Cooke, p. 100. "This is another protection against a possible abuse by Congress. The right protected is really the right of a state to maintain an armed militia, or national guard, as we call it now. In the eighteenth century people feared that Congress might, by passing a law, prohibit the states from arming their citizens. Then having all the armed strength at its command, the national government could overwhelm the states. Such a circumstance has never happened, but this amendment would prevent it. The Second Amendment does not give anybody or everybody the right to possess and use firearms. The states may very properly prescribe regulations and permits governing the use of guns within their borders.") or prohibiting citizens from arming themselves. Though it has been argued that the states lost the power to arm their citizens when the power to arm the militia was transferred from the states to the federal government by Article I, Section 8 of the Constitution, the individual right to arm was retained and strengthened by the Militia Acts of 1792 and the similar act of 1795.

More recently some have advanced what has been called the insurrectionist theory of the Second Amendment whereby it is the right of any citizen to take up arms against their government should they consider it illegitimate. Such a reading has been voiced by organizations such as the National Rifle Association of America (NRA) and by various individuals including some elected officials. Congressman Jamie Raskin, however, has argued that there is no basis in constitutional law or scholarship for this view. He notes that, not only does this represent a misreading of the text of the Amendment as drafted, it stands in violation of other elements of the Constitution.

== State Constitutional Precursors to the Second Amendment ==
Related Articles & Sections within the first State Constitutions Adopted after May 10, 1776.

Note: On May 10, 1776, Congress passed a resolution recommending that any colony with a government that was not inclined toward independence should form one that was.

=== Virginia, June 12, 1776 ===
Virginia's Constitution lists the reasons for dissolving its ties with the King in the formation of its own independent state government. Including the following:

- Keeping among us, in times of peace, standing armies and ships of war.
- Effecting to render the military independent of, and superior to, the civil power.

* These same reasons would later be outlined within the Declaration of Independence.

A Declaration of Rights. Section 13. That a well-regulated militia, composed of the body of the people, trained to arms, is the proper, natural, and safe defence of a free State; that standing armies, in time of peace, should be avoided, as dangerous to liberty; and that in all cases the military should be under strict subordination to, and governed by, the civil power.

=== Pennsylvania, September 28, 1776 ===
Article 13. That the people have a right to bear arms for the defence of themselves and the state; and as standing armies in the time of peace are dangerous to liberty, they ought not to be kept up; And that the military should be kept under strict subordination to, and governed by, the civil power.

This is the first instance in relationship to U.S. Constitutional Law of the phrase "right to bear arms".

Article 43. The inhabitants of this state shall have the liberty to fowl and hunt in seasonable times on the lands they hold, and on all other lands therein not inclosed;

It is relevant that Pennsylvania was a Quaker colony traditionally opposed to bearing arms. "In settling Pennsylvania, William Penn had a great experiment in view, a 'holy experiment', as he term[ed] it. This was no less than to test, on a scale of considerable magnitude, the practicability of founding and governing a State on the sure principles of the Christian religion; where the executive should be sustained without arms; where justice should be administered without oaths; and where real religion might flourish without the incubus of a hierarchical system." The non-Quaker residents, many from the western Counties, complained often and loudly of being denied the right to a common defense. By the time of the American Revolution, through what could be described as a revolution within a revolution, the pro-militia factions had gained ascendancy in the state's government. And by a manipulation through the use of oaths, disqualifying Quaker members, they made up a vast majority of the convention forming the new state constitution; it was only natural that they would assert their efforts to form a compulsory state militia in the context of a "right" to defend themselves and the state.

=== Maryland, November 11, 1776 ===
Articles XXV–XXVII. 25. That a well-regulated militia is the proper and natural defence of a free government. 26. That standing armies are dangerous to liberty, and ought not to be raised or kept up, without consent of the Legislature. 27. That in all cases, and at all times, the military ought to be under strict subordination to and control of the civil power.

=== North Carolina, December 18, 1776 ===
A Declaration of Rights. Article XVII. That the people have a right to bear arms, for the defence of the State; and, as standing armies, in time of peace, are dangerous to liberty, they ought not to be kept up; and that the military should be kept under strict subordination to, and governed by, the civil power.

=== New York, April 20, 1777 ===
Article XL. And whereas it is of the utmost importance to the safety of every State that it should always be in a condition of defence; and it is the duty of every man who enjoys the protection of society to be prepared and willing to defend it; this convention therefore, in the name and by the authority of the good people of this State, doth ordain, determine, and declare that the militia of this State, at all times hereafter, as well in peace as in war, shall be armed and disciplined, and in readiness for service. That all such of the inhabitants of this State being of the people called Quakers as, from scruples of conscience, may be averse to the bearing of arms, be therefrom excused by the legislature; and do pay to the State such sums of money, in lieu of their personal service, as the same; may, in the judgment of the legislature, be worth. And that a proper magazine of warlike stores, proportionate to the number of inhabitants, be, forever hereafter, at the expense of this State, and by acts of the legislature, established, maintained, and continued in every county in this State.

=== Vermont, July 8, 1777 ===
Chapter 1. Section XVIII. That the people have a right to bear arms for the defence of the themselves and the State; and as standing armies, in the time of peace, are dangerous to liberty, they ought not to be kept up; and that the military should be kept under strict subordination to, and governed by, the civil power.

=== Massachusetts, June 15, 1780 ===
A Declaration of Rights. Chapter 1. Article XVII. The people have a right to keep and to bear arms for the common defence. And as, in time of peace, armies are dangerous to liberty, they ought not to be maintained without the consent of the legislature; and the military power shall always be held in an exact subordination to the civil authority and be governed by it.

== Drafting and adoption of the Constitution ==
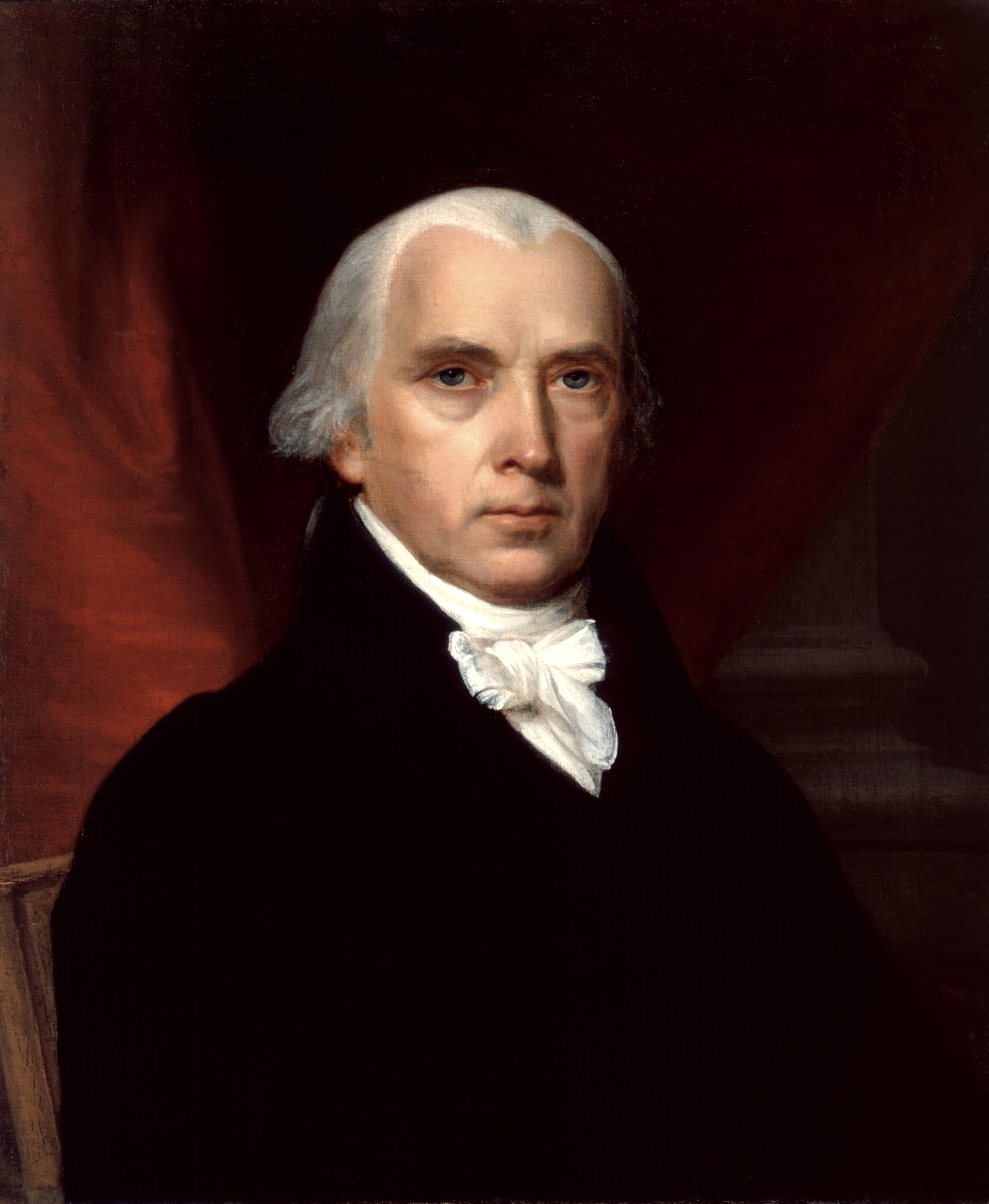
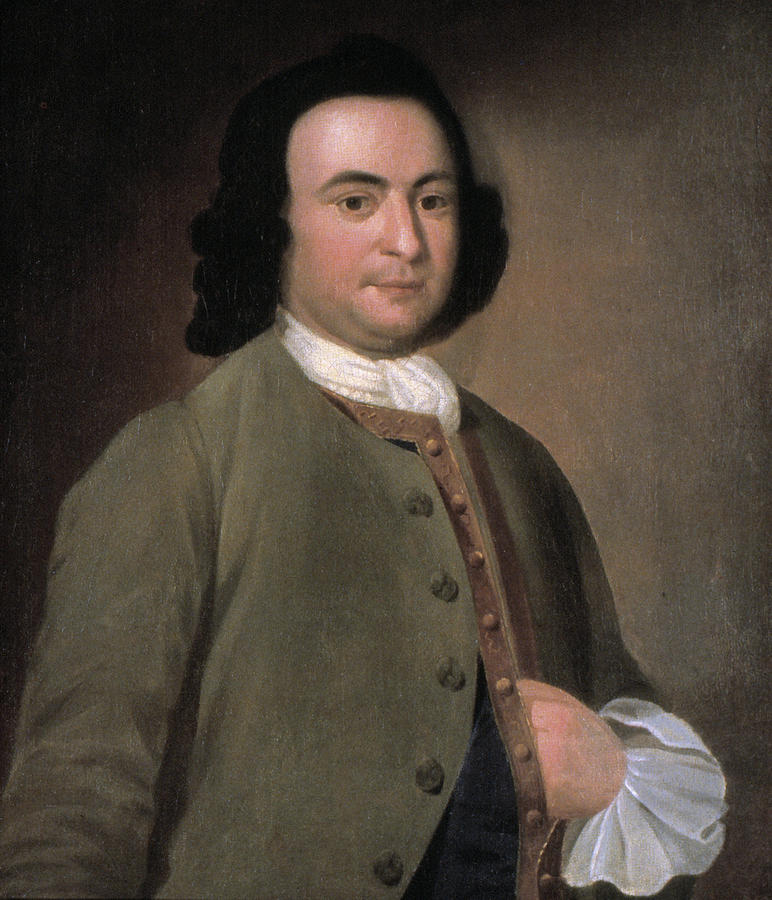
James Madison (left) is known as the "Father of the Constitution" and "Father of the Bill of Rights" while George Mason (right) with Madison is also known as the "Father of the Bill of Rights".
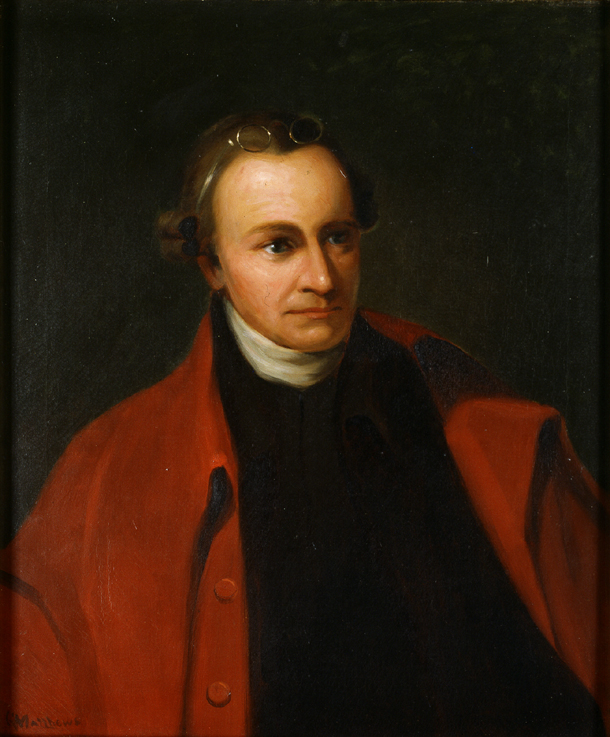
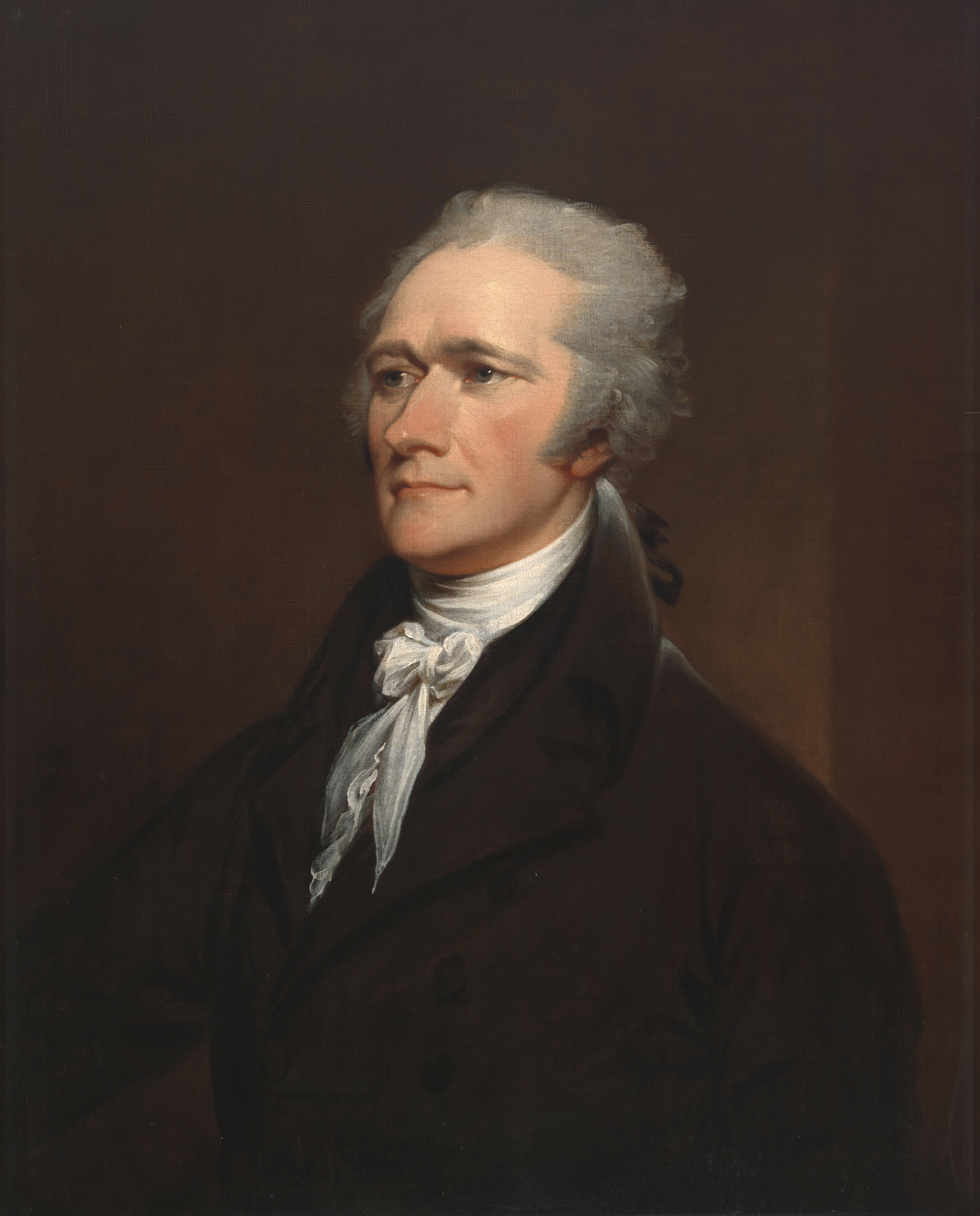
Patrick Henry (left) believed that a citizenry trained in arms was the only sure guarantor of liberty while Alexander Hamilton (right) wrote in Federalist No. 29 that "little more can be reasonably aimed at, with respect to the people at large, than to have them properly armed ..."

In March 1785, delegates from Virginia and Maryland assembled at the Mount Vernon Conference to fashion a remedy to the inefficiencies of the Articles of Confederation. The following year, at a meeting in Annapolis, Maryland, 12 delegates from five states (New Jersey, New York, Pennsylvania, Delaware, and Virginia) met and drew up a list of problems with the current government model. At its conclusion, the delegates scheduled a follow-up meeting in Philadelphia, Pennsylvania for May 1787 to present solutions to these problems, such as the absence of:

- interstate arbitration processes to handle quarrels between states;
- sufficiently trained and armed intrastate security forces to suppress insurrection;
- a national militia to repel foreign invaders.

It quickly became apparent that the solution to all three of these problems required shifting control of the states' militias to the federal Congress and giving it the power to raise a standing army. Article 1, Section 8 of the Constitution codified these changes by allowing the Congress to provide for the common defense and general welfare of the United States by doing the following:

- raise and support armies, but no appropriation of money to that use shall be for a longer term than two years;
- provide and maintain a navy;
- make rules for the government and regulation of the land and naval forces;
- provide for calling forth the militia to execute the laws of the union, suppress insurrections and repel invasions;
- provide for organizing, arming, and disciplining the militia, and for governing such part of them as may be employed in the service of the United States, reserving to the states respectively, the appointment of the officers, and the authority of training the militia according to the discipline prescribed by Congress.

Some representatives mistrusted proposals to enlarge federal powers, because they were concerned about the inherent risks of centralizing power. Federalists, including James Madison, initially argued that a bill of rights was unnecessary, sufficiently confident that the federal government could never raise a standing army powerful enough to overcome a militia. Federalist Noah Webster argued that an armed populace would have no trouble resisting the potential threat to liberty of a standing army. Anti-federalists, on the other hand, advocated amending the Constitution with clearly defined and enumerated rights providing more explicit constraints on the new government. Many Anti-federalists feared the new federal government would choose to disarm state militias. Federalists countered that in listing only certain rights, unlisted rights might lose protection. The Federalists realized there was insufficient support to ratify the Constitution without a bill of rights and so they promised to support amending the Constitution to add a bill of rights following the Constitution's adoption. This compromise persuaded enough Anti-federalists to vote for the Constitution, allowing for ratification. The Constitution was declared ratified on June 21, 1788, when nine of the original thirteen states had ratified it. The remaining four states later followed suit, although the last two states, North Carolina and Rhode Island, ratified only after Congress had passed the Bill of Rights and sent it to the states for ratification. James Madison drafted what ultimately became the Bill of Rights, which was proposed by the first Congress on June 8, 1789, and was adopted on December 15, 1791.

== Debates on amending the Constitution ==
The debate surrounding the Constitution's ratification is of practical importance, particularly to adherents of originalist and strict constructionist legal theories. In the context of such legal theories and elsewhere, it is important to understand the language of the Constitution in terms of what that language meant to the people who wrote and ratified the Constitution.

Robert Whitehill, a delegate from Pennsylvania, sought to clarify the draft Constitution with a bill of rights explicitly granting individuals the right to hunt on their own land in season, though Whitehill's language was never debated.

=== Argument for state power ===
There was substantial opposition to the new Constitution because it moved the power to arm the state militias from the states to the federal government. This created a fear that the federal government, by neglecting the upkeep of the militia, could have overwhelming military force at its disposal through its power to maintain a standing army and navy, leading to a confrontation with the states, encroaching on the states' reserved powers and even engaging in a military takeover. Article VI of the Articles of Confederation states:

No vessel of war shall be kept up in time of peace by any State, except such number only, as shall be deemed necessary by the united States in congress assembled, for the defense of such State, or its trade; nor shall any body of forces be kept up by any State in time of peace, except such number only, as in the judgement of the united States, in congress assembled, shall be deemed requisite to garrison the forts necessary for the defense of such State; but every State shall always keep up a well-regulated and disciplined militia, sufficiently armed and accoutered, and shall provide and constantly have ready for use, in public stores, a due number of field pieces and tents, and a proper quantity of arms, ammunition and camp equipage.

In contrast, Article I, Section 8, Clause 16 of the U.S. Constitution states:

To provide for organizing, arming, and disciplining, the Militia, and for governing such Part of them as may be employed in the Service of the United States, reserving to the States respectively, the Appointment of the Officers, and the Authority of training the Militia according to the discipline prescribed by Congress.

=== Government tyranny ===
A foundation of American political thought during the Revolutionary period was concern about political corruption and governmental tyranny. Even the federalists, fending off their opponents who accused them of creating an oppressive regime, were careful to acknowledge the risks of tyranny. Against that backdrop, the framers saw the personal right to bear arms as a potential check against tyranny. Theodore Sedgwick of Massachusetts expressed this sentiment by declaring that it is "a chimerical idea to suppose that a country like this could ever be enslaved ... Is it possible ... that an army could be raised for the purpose of enslaving themselves or their brethren? Or, if raised whether they could subdue a nation of freemen, who know how to prize liberty and who have arms in their hands?" Noah Webster similarly argued:

Before a standing army can rule the people must be disarmed; as they are in almost every kingdom in Europe. The supreme power in America cannot enforce unjust laws by the sword; because the whole body of the people are armed, and constitute a force superior to any band of regular troops that can be, on any pretence, raised in the United States.

George Mason also argued the importance of the militia and right to bear arms by reminding his compatriots of the British government's efforts "to disarm the people; that it was the best and most effectual way to enslave them ... by totally disusing and neglecting the militia." He also clarified that under prevailing practice the militia included all people, rich and poor. "Who are the militia? They consist now of the whole people, except a few public officers." Because all were members of the militia, all enjoyed the right to individually bear arms to serve therein.

Writing after the ratification of the Constitution, but before the election of the first Congress, James Monroe included "the right to keep and bear arms" in a list of basic "human rights", which he proposed to be added to the Constitution.

Patrick Henry argued in the Virginia ratification convention on June 5, 1788, for the dual rights to arms and resistance to oppression:

Guard with jealous attention the public liberty. Suspect everyone who approaches that jewel. Unfortunately, nothing will preserve it but downright force. Whenever you give up that force, you are inevitably ruined.

=== To maintain slavery ===
==== Preserving slave patrols ====
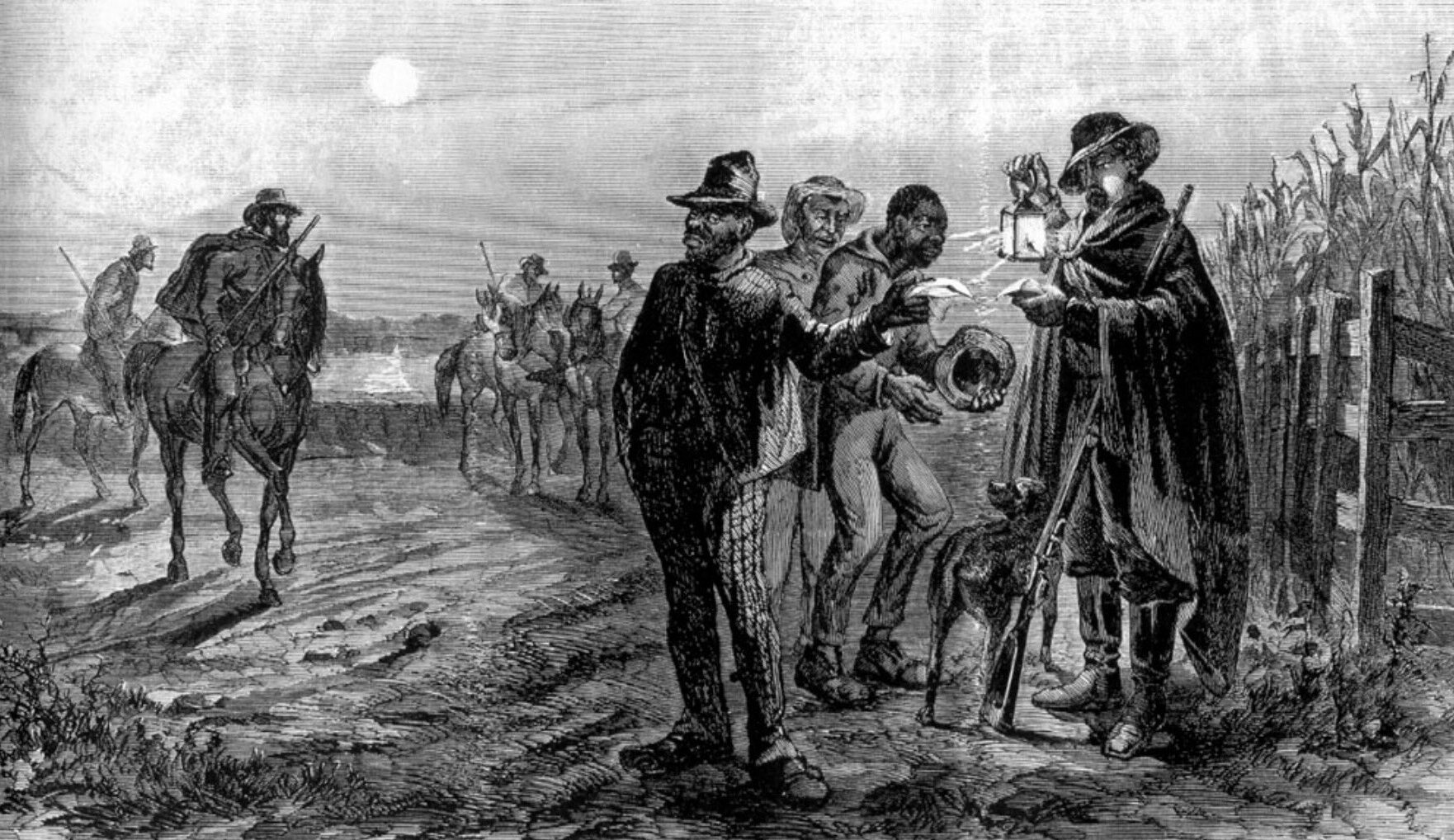
An illustration of Mississippi slave patrol

In the slave states, the militia was available for military operations, but its biggest function was to police the slaves. According to Dr Carl T. Bogus, Professor of Law of the Roger Williams University Law School in Rhode Island, the Second Amendment was written to assure the Southern states that Congress would not undermine the slave system by using its newly acquired constitutional authority over the militia to disarm the state militia and thereby destroy the South's principal instrument of slave control. In his close analysis of James Madison's writings, Bogus describes the South's obsession with militias during the ratification process:

The militia remained the principal means of protecting the social order and preserving white control over an enormous black population. Anything that might weaken this system presented the gravest of threats.

This preoccupation is clearly expressed in 1788 by the slaveholder Patrick Henry:

If the country be invaded, a state may go to war, but cannot suppress insurrections [under this new Constitution]. If there should happen an insurrection of slaves, the country cannot be said to be invaded. They cannot, therefore, suppress it without the interposition of Congress ... Congress, and Congress only [under this new Constitution; addition not mentioned in source], can call forth the militia.

Therefore, Bogus argues, in a compromise with the slave states, and to reassure Patrick Henry, George Mason and other slaveholders that they would be able to keep their slave control militias independent of the federal government, James Madison (also slave owner) redrafted the Second Amendment into its current form "for the specific purpose of assuring the Southern states, and particularly his constituents in Virginia, that the federal government would not undermine their security against slave insurrection by disarming the militia."

Legal historian Paul Finkelman argues that this scenario is implausible. Henry and Mason were political enemies of Madison's, and neither man was in Congress at the time Madison drafted Bill of Rights; moreover, Patrick Henry argued against the ratification of both the Constitution and the Second Amendment, and it was Henry's opposition that led Patrick's home state of Virginia to be the last to ratify.

Most Southern white men between the ages of 18 and 45 were required to serve on "slave patrols" which were organized groups of white men who enforced discipline upon enslaved blacks. Bogus writes with respect to Georgia laws passed in 1755 and 1757 in this context: "The Georgia statutes required patrols, under the direction of commissioned militia officers, to examine every plantation each month and authorized them to search 'all Negro Houses for offensive Weapons and Ammunition' and to apprehend and give twenty lashes to any slave found outside plantation grounds."

Finkelman recognises that James Madison "drafted an amendment to protect the right of the states to maintain their militias," but insists that "The amendment had nothing to do with state police powers, which were the basis of slave patrols."

==== To avoid arming free blacks ====
Firstly, slave owners feared that enslaved blacks might be emancipated through military service. A few years earlier, there had been a precedent when Lord Dunmore offered freedom to slaves who escaped and joined his forces with "Liberty to Slaves" stitched onto their jacket pocket flaps. Freed slaves also served in General Washington's army.

Secondly, they also greatly feared "a ruinous slave rebellion in which their families would be slaughtered and their property destroyed." When Virginia ratified the Bill of Rights on December 15, 1791, the Haitian Revolution, a successful slave rebellion, was under way. The right to bear arms was therefore deliberately tied to membership in a militia by the slaveholder and chief drafter of the Amendment, James Madison, because only whites could join militias in the South.

In 1776, Thomas Jefferson had submitted a draft constitution for Virginia that said "no freeman shall ever be debarred the use of arms within his own lands or tenements". According to Picadio, this version was rejected because "it would have given to free blacks the constitutional right to have firearms".

== Conflict and compromise in Congress produce the Bill of Rights ==
James Madison's initial proposal for a bill of rights was brought to the floor of the House of Representatives on June 8, 1789, during the first session of Congress. The initial proposed passage relating to arms was:

The right of the people to keep and bear arms shall not be infringed; a well armed and well regulated militia being the best security of a free country: but no person religiously scrupulous of bearing arms shall be compelled to render military service in person.

On July 21, Madison again raised the issue of his bill and proposed that a select committee be created to report on it. The House voted in favor of Madison's motion, and the Bill of Rights entered committee for review. The committee returned to the House a reworded version of the Second Amendment on July 28. On August 17, that version was read into the Journal:

A well regulated militia, composed of the body of the people, being the best security of a free State, the right of the people to keep and bear arms shall not be infringed; but no person religiously scrupulous shall be compelled to bear arms.

In late August 1789, the House debated and modified the Second Amendment. These debates revolved primarily around the risk of "mal-administration of the government" using the "religiously scrupulous" clause to destroy the militia as British forces had attempted to destroy the Patriot militia at the commencement of the American Revolution. These concerns were addressed by modifying the final clause, and on August 24, the House sent the following version to the Senate:

A well regulated militia, composed of the body of the people, being the best security of a free state, the right of the people to keep and bear arms shall not be infringed; but no one religiously scrupulous of bearing arms shall be compelled to render military service in person.

The next day, August 25, the Senate received the amendment from the House and entered it into the Senate Journal. However, the Senate scribe added a comma before "shall not be infringed" and changed the semicolon separating that phrase from the religious exemption portion to a comma:

A well regulated militia, composed of the body of the people, being the best security of a free state, the right of the people to keep and bear arms, shall not be infringed, but no one religiously scrupulous of bearing arms shall be compelled to render military service in person.

By this time, the proposed right to keep and bear arms was in a separate amendment, instead of being in a single amendment together with other proposed rights such as the due process right. As a representative explained, this change allowed each amendment to "be passed upon distinctly by the States". On September 4, the Senate voted to change the language of the Second Amendment by removing the definition of militia, and striking the conscientious objector clause:

A well regulated militia, being the best security of a free state, the right of the people to keep and bear arms, shall not be infringed.

The Senate returned to this amendment for a final time on September 9. A proposal to insert the words "for the common defence" next to the words "bear arms" was defeated. A motion passed to replace the words "the best", and insert in lieu thereof "necessary to the" . The Senate then slightly modified the language to read as the fourth article and voted to return the Bill of Rights to the House. The final version by the Senate was amended to read as:

A well regulated militia being necessary to the security of a free state, the right of the people to keep and bear arms, shall not be infringed.

The House voted on September 21, 1789, to accept the changes made by the Senate.

The enrolled original Joint Resolution passed by Congress on September 25, 1789, on permanent display in the Rotunda, reads as:

A well regulated militia, being necessary to the security of a free State, the right of the People to keep and bear arms, shall not be infringed.

On December 15, 1791, the Bill of Rights (the first ten amendments to the Constitution) was adopted, having been ratified by three-fourths of the states, having been ratified as a group by all the fourteen states then in existence except Connecticut, Massachusetts, and Georgia – which added ratifications in 1939.

== Militia following ratification ==
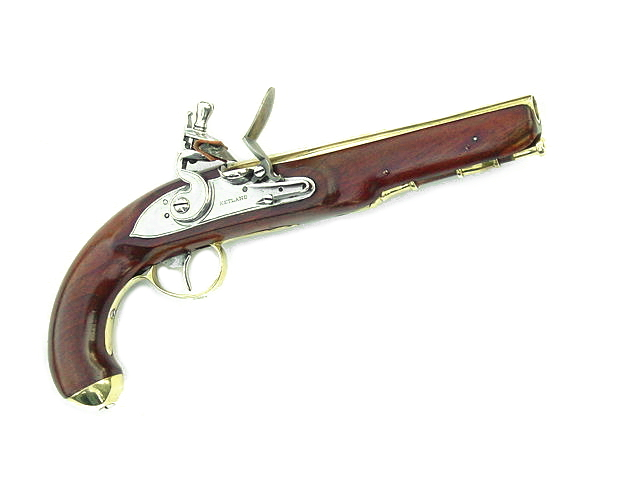
Ketland brass barrel smooth bore pistol, common in Colonial America

During the first two decades following the ratification of the Second Amendment, public opposition to standing armies, among Anti-Federalists and Federalists alike, persisted and manifested itself locally as a general reluctance to create a professional armed police force, instead relying on county sheriffs, constables and night watchmen to enforce local ordinances. Though sometimes compensated, often these positions were unpaid – held as a matter of civic duty. In these early decades, law enforcement officers were rarely armed with firearms, using billy clubs as their sole defensive weapons. In serious emergencies, a posse comitatus, militia company, or group of vigilantes assumed law enforcement duties; these individuals were more likely than the local sheriff to be armed with firearms.

On May 8, 1792, Congress passed "[a]n act more effectually to provide for the National Defence, by establishing an Uniform Militia throughout the United States" requiring:

[E]ach and every free able-bodied white male citizen of the respective States, resident therein, who is or shall be of age of eighteen years, and under the age of forty-five years (except as is herein after excepted) shall severally and respectively be enrolled in the militia ... [and] every citizen so enrolled and notified, shall, within six months thereafter, provide himself with a good musket or firelock, a sufficient bayonet and belt, two spare flints, and a knapsack, a pouch with a box therein to contain not less than twenty-four cartridges, suited to the bore of his musket or firelock, each cartridge to contain a proper quantity of powder and ball: or with a good rifle, knapsack, shot-pouch and powder-horn, twenty balls suited to the bore of his rifle, and a quarter of a pound of powder; and shall appear, so armed, accoutred and provided, when called out to exercise, or into service, except, that when called out on company days to exercise only, he may appear without a knapsack.

The act also gave specific instructions to domestic weapon manufacturers "that from and after five years from the passing of this act, muskets for arming the militia as herein required, shall be of bores sufficient for balls of the eighteenth part of a pound." In practice, private acquisition and maintenance of rifles and muskets meeting specifications and readily available for militia duty proved problematic; estimates of compliance ranged from 10 to 65 percent. Compliance with the enrollment provisions was also poor. In addition to the exemptions granted by the law for custom-house officers and their clerks, post-officers and stage drivers employed in the care and conveyance of U.S. mail, ferrymen, export inspectors, pilots, merchant mariners and those deployed at sea in active service; state legislatures granted numerous exemptions under Section 2 of the Act, including exemptions for: clergy, conscientious objectors, teachers, students, and jurors. Though a number of able-bodied white men remained available for service, many simply did not show up for militia duty. Penalties for failure to appear were enforced sporadically and selectively. None is mentioned in the legislation.

The first test of the militia system occurred in July 1794, when a group of disaffected Pennsylvania farmers rebelled against federal tax collectors whom they viewed as illegitimate tools of tyrannical power. Attempts by the four adjoining states to raise a militia for nationalization to suppress the insurrection proved inadequate. When officials resorted to drafting men, they faced bitter resistance. Forthcoming soldiers consisted primarily of draftees or paid substitutes as well as poor enlistees lured by enlistment bonuses. The officers, however, were of a higher quality, responding out of a sense of civic duty and patriotism, and generally critical of the rank and file. Most of the 13,000 soldiers lacked the required weaponry; the war department provided nearly two-thirds of them with guns. In October, President George Washington and General Harry Lee marched on the 7,000 rebels who conceded without fighting. The episode provoked criticism of the citizen militia and inspired calls for a universal militia. Secretary of War Henry Knox and Vice President John Adams had lobbied Congress to establish federal armories to stock imported weapons and encourage domestic production. Congress did subsequently pass "[a]n act for the erecting and repairing of Arsenals and Magazines" on April 2, 1794, two months prior to the insurrection. Nevertheless, the militia continued to deteriorate and twenty years later, the militia's poor condition contributed to several losses in the War of 1812, including the sacking of Washington, D.C., and the burning of the White House in 1814.

In the 20th century, Congress passed the Militia Act of 1903. The act defined the militia as every able-bodied male aged 18 to 44 who was a citizen or intended to become one. The militia was then divided by the act into the United States National Guard and the unorganized Reserve Militia.

Federal law continues to define the militia as all able-bodied males aged 17 to 44, who are citizens or intend to become one, and female citizens who are members of the National Guard. The militia is divided into the organized militia, which consists of the National Guard and Naval Militia, and the unorganized militia.

== Scholarly commentary ==
=== Early commentary ===
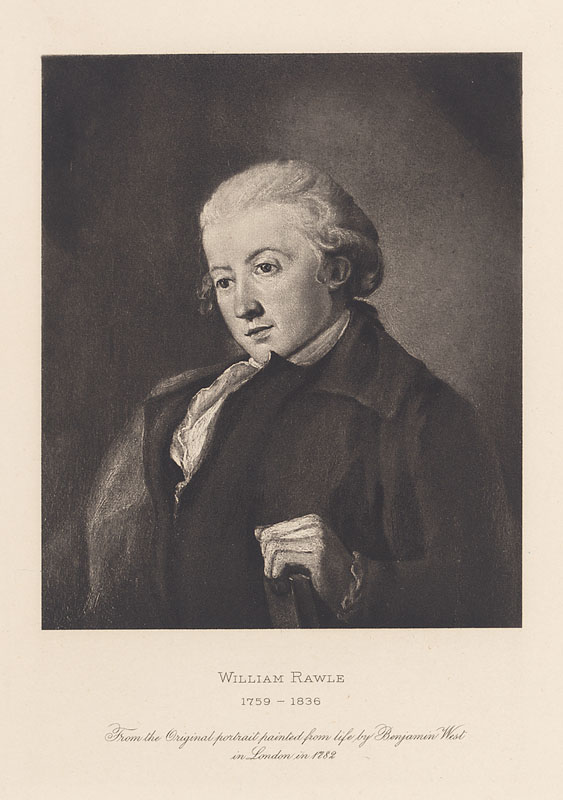
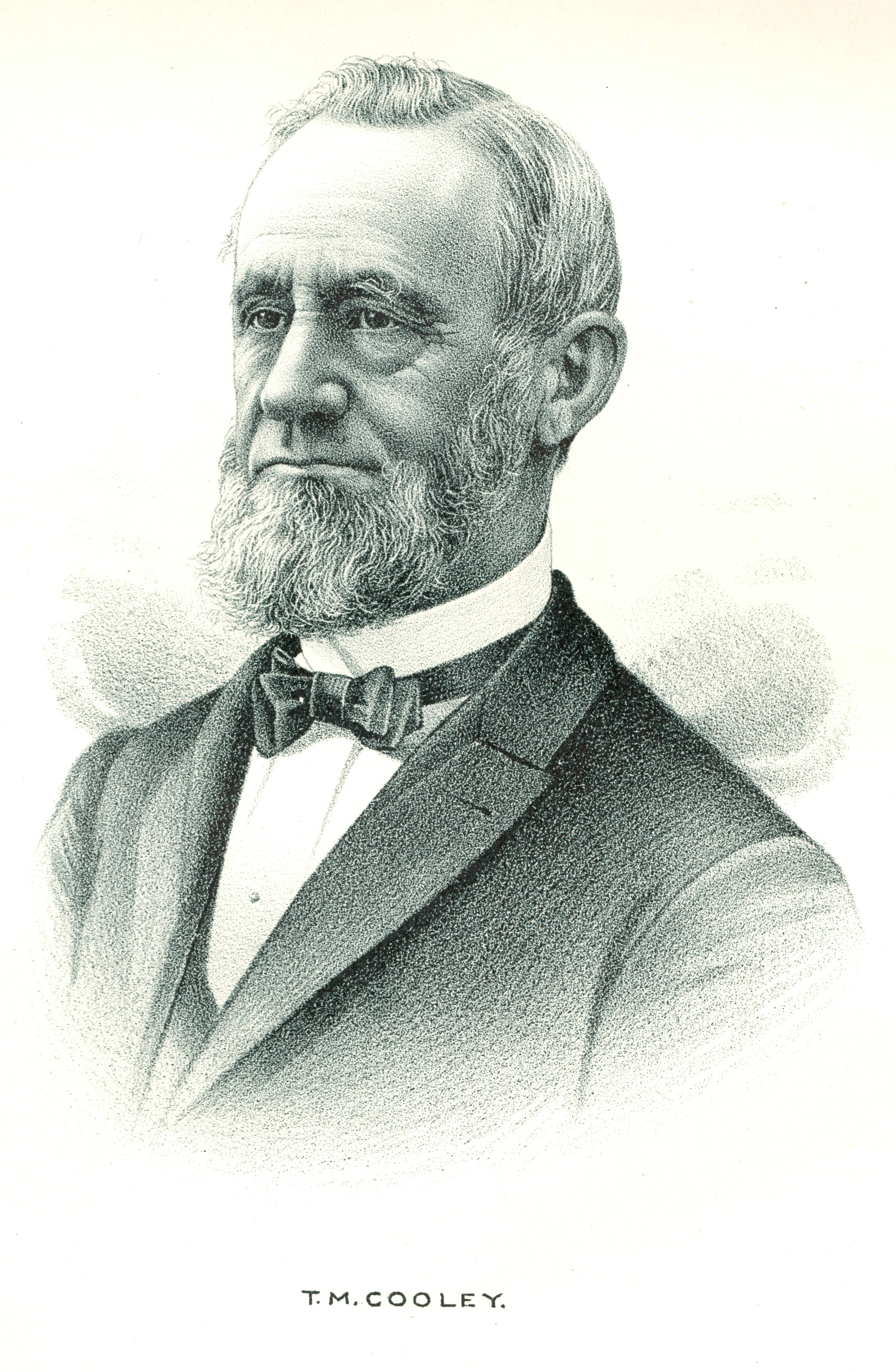
William Rawle of Pennsylvania (left) was a lawyer and district attorney; Thomas M. Cooley of Michigan (right) was an educator and judge.
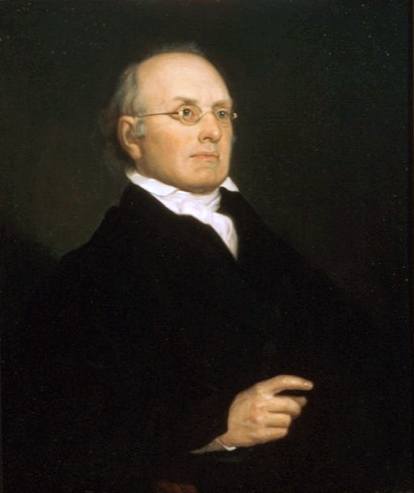
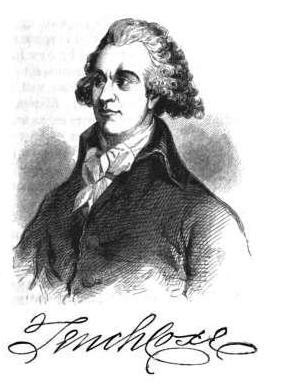
Joseph Story of Massachusetts (left) became a U.S. Supreme Court justice; Tench Coxe of Pennsylvania (right) was a political economist and delegate to the Continental Congress.

==== The "Federal Farmer" ====
In May 1788, the pseudonymous author "Federal Farmer" (his real identity is presumed to be either Richard Henry Lee or Melancton Smith) wrote in Additional Letters From The Federal Farmer #169 or Letter XVIII regarding the definition of a "militia":

A militia, when properly formed, are in fact the people themselves, and render regular troops in a great measure unnecessary.

==== George Mason ====
In June 1788, George Mason addressed the Virginia Ratifying Convention regarding a "militia:"

A worthy member has asked, who are the militia, if they be not the people, of this country, and if we are not to be protected from the fate of the Germans, Prussians, &c. by our representation? I ask who are the militia? They consist now of the whole people, except a few public officers. But I cannot say who will be the militia of the future day. If that paper on the table gets no alteration, the militia of the future day may not consist of all classes, high and low, and rich and poor; but may be confined to the lower and middle classes of the people, granting exclusion to the higher classes of the people. If we should ever see that day, the most ignominious punishments and heavy fines may be expected. Under the present government all ranks of people are subject to militia duty.

==== Tench Coxe ====
In 1792, Tench Coxe made the following point in a commentary on the Second Amendment:

As civil rulers, not having their duty to the people duly before them, may attempt to tyrannize, and as the military forces which must be occasionally raised to defend our country, might pervert their power to the injury of their fellow citizens, the people are confirmed by the next article in their right to keep and bear their private arms.

==== Tucker/Blackstone ====
The earliest published commentary on the Second Amendment by a major constitutional theorist was by St. George Tucker. He annotated a five-volume edition of Sir William Blackstone's Commentaries on the Laws of England, a critical legal reference for early American attorneys published in 1803. Tucker wrote:

A well regulated militia being necessary to the security of a free state, the right of the people to keep, and bear arms, shall not be infringed. Amendments to C. U. S. Art. 4. This may be considered as the true palladium of liberty ... The right of self defence is the first law of nature: In most governments it has been the study of rulers to confine this right within the narrowest limits possible. Wherever standing armies are kept up, and the right of the people to keep and bear arms is, under any colour or pretext whatsoever, prohibited, liberty, if not already annihilated, is on the brink of destruction. In England, the people have been disarmed, generally, under the specious pretext of preserving the game : a never failing lure to bring over the landed aristocracy to support any measure, under that mask, though calculated for very different purposes. True it is, their bill of rights seems at first view to counteract this policy: but the right of bearing arms is confined to protestants, and the words suitable to their condition and degree, have been interpreted to authorise the prohibition of keeping a gun or other engine for the destruction of game, to any farmer, or inferior tradesman, or other person not qualified to kill game. So that not one man in five hundred can keep a gun in his house without being subject to a penalty.

In footnotes 40 and 41 of the Commentaries, Tucker stated that the right to bear arms under the Second Amendment was not subject to the restrictions that were part of English law: "The right of the people to keep and bear arms shall not be infringed. Amendments to C. U. S. Art. 4, and this without any qualification as to their condition or degree, as is the case in the British government" and "whoever examines the forest, and game laws in the British code, will readily perceive that the right of keeping arms is effectually taken away from the people of England." Blackstone himself also commented on English game laws, Vol. II, p. 412, "that the prevention of popular insurrections and resistance to government by disarming the bulk of the people, is a reason oftener meant than avowed by the makers of the forest and game laws." Blackstone discussed the right of self-defense in a separate section of his treatise on the common law of crimes. Tucker's annotations for that latter section did not mention the Second Amendment but cited the standard works of English jurists such as Hawkins. (Note: For two radically different views of Blackstone on the Second Amendment, see Heyman, Chicago-Kent, and Volokh, "Senate Testimony".)

Further, Tucker criticized the English Bill of Rights for limiting gun ownership to the very wealthy, leaving the populace effectively disarmed, and expressed the hope that Americans "never cease to regard the right of keeping and bearing arms as the surest pledge of their liberty."

==== William Rawle ====
Tucker's commentary was soon followed, in 1825, by that of William Rawle in his landmark text A View of the Constitution of the United States of America. Like Tucker, Rawle condemned England's "arbitrary code for the preservation of game", portraying that country as one that "boasts so much of its freedom", yet provides a right to "protestant subjects only" that it "cautiously describ[es] to be that of bearing arms for their defence" and reserves for "[a] very small proportion of the people[.]" In contrast, Rawle characterizes the second clause of the Second Amendment, which he calls the corollary clause, as a general prohibition against such capricious abuse of government power.

Speaking of the Second Amendment generally, Rawle wrote:

The prohibition is general. No clause in the Constitution could by any rule of construction be conceived to give to congress a power to disarm the people. Such a flagitious attempt could only be made under some general pretence by a state legislature. But if in any blind pursuit of inordinate power, either should attempt it, this amendment may be appealed to as a restraint on both.

Rawle, long before the concept of incorporation was formally recognized by the courts, or Congress drafted the Fourteenth Amendment, contended that citizens could appeal to the Second Amendment should either the state or federal government attempt to disarm them. He did warn, however, that "this right [to bear arms] ought not ... be abused to the disturbance of the public peace" and, paraphrasing Coke, observed: "An assemblage of persons with arms, for unlawful purpose, is an indictable offence, and even the carrying of arms abroad by a single individual, attended with circumstances giving just reason to fear that he purposes to make an unlawful use of them, would be sufficient cause to require him to give surety of the peace."

==== Joseph Story ====
Joseph Story articulated in his influential Commentaries on the Constitution the orthodox view of the Second Amendment, which he viewed as the amendment's clear meaning:

The right of the citizens to keep and bear arms has justly been considered, as the palladium of the liberties of a republic; since it offers a strong moral check against the usurpations and arbitrary power of rulers; and it will generally, even if these are successful in the first instance, enable the people to resist and triumph over them. And yet, though this truth would seem so clear, and the importance of a well-regulated militia would seem so undeniable, it cannot be disguised, that among the American people there is a growing indifference to any system of militia discipline, and a strong disposition, from a sense of its burdens, to be rid of all regulations. How it is practicable to keep the people duly armed without some organization, it is difficult to see. There is certainly no small danger, that indifference may lead to disgust, and disgust to contempt; and thus gradually undermine all the protection intended by this clause of our National Bill of Rights.

Story describes a militia as the "natural defence of a free country", both against foreign foes, domestic revolts and usurpation by rulers. The book regards the militia as a "moral check" against both usurpation and the arbitrary use of power, while expressing distress at the growing indifference of the American people to maintaining such an organized militia, which could lead to the undermining of the protection of the Second Amendment.

==== Lysander Spooner ====
Abolitionist Lysander Spooner, commenting on bills of rights, stated that the object of all bills of rights is to assert the rights of individuals against the government and that the Second Amendment right to keep and bear arms was in support of the right to resist government oppression, as the only security against the tyranny of government lies in forcible resistance to injustice, for injustice will certainly be executed, unless forcibly resisted. Spooner's theory provided the intellectual foundation for John Brown and other radical abolitionists who believed that arming slaves was not only morally justified, but entirely consistent with the Second Amendment. An express connection between this right and the Second Amendment was drawn by Lysander Spooner who commented that a "right of resistance" is protected by both the right to trial by jury and the Second Amendment.

The congressional debate on the proposed Fourteenth Amendment concentrated on what the Southern States were doing to harm the newly freed slaves, including disarming the former slaves.

==== Timothy Farrar ====
In 1867, Judge Timothy Farrar published his Manual of the Constitution of the United States of America, which was written when the Fourteenth Amendment was "in the process of adoption by the State legislatures":

The States are recognized as governments, and, when their own constitutions permit, may do as they please; provided they do not interfere with the Constitution and laws of the United States, or with the civil or natural rights of the people recognized thereby, and held in conformity to them. The right of every person to "life, liberty, and property", to "keep and bear arms", to the "writ of habeas corpus" to "trial by jury", and divers others, are recognized by, and held under, the Constitution of the United States, and cannot be infringed by individuals or even by the government itself.

==== Judge Thomas Cooley ====
Judge Thomas M. Cooley, perhaps the most widely read constitutional scholar of the nineteenth century, wrote extensively about this amendment, and he explained in 1880 how the Second Amendment protected the "right of the people":

It might be supposed from the phraseology of this provision that the right to keep and bear arms was only guaranteed to the militia; but this would be an interpretation not warranted by the intent. The militia, as has been elsewhere explained, consists of those persons who, under the law, are liable to the performance of military duty, and are officered and enrolled for service when called upon. But the law may make provision for the enrolment of all who are fit to perform military duty, or of a small number only, or it may wholly omit to make any provision at all; and if the right were limited to those enrolled, the purpose of this guaranty might be defeated altogether by the action or neglect to act of the government it was meant to hold in check. The meaning of the provision undoubtedly is, that the people, from whom the militia must be taken, shall have the right to keep and bear arms; and they need no permission or regulation of law for the purpose. But this enables the government to have a well-regulated militia; for to bear arms implies something more than the mere keeping; it implies the learning to handle and use them in a way that makes those who keep them ready for their efficient use; in other words, it implies the right to meet for voluntary discipline in arms, observing in doing so the laws of public order.

=== Commentary since late 20th century ===
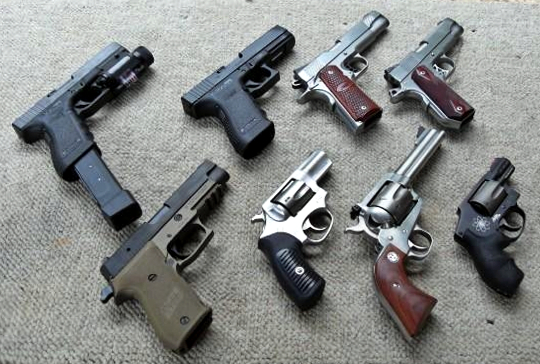
Assortment of 20th century handguns

Until the late 20th century, there was little scholarly commentary of the Second Amendment. In the latter half of the 20th century, there was considerable debate over whether the Second Amendment protected an individual right or a collective right. The debate centered on whether the prefatory clause ("A well regulated militia being necessary to the security of a free State") declared the amendment's only purpose or merely announced a purpose to introduce the operative clause ("the right of the People to keep and bear arms shall not be infringed"). Scholars advanced three competing theoretical models for how the prefatory clause should be interpreted.

The first, known as the "states' rights" or "collective right" model, held that the Second Amendment does not apply to individuals; rather, it recognizes the right of each state to arm its militia. Under this approach, citizens "have no right to keep or bear arms, but the states have a collective right to have the National Guard". Advocates of collective rights models argued that the Second Amendment was written to prevent the federal government from disarming state militias, rather than to secure an individual right to possess firearms. Prior to 2001, every circuit court decision that interpreted the Second Amendment endorsed the "collective right" model. However, beginning with the Fifth Circuit's opinion United States v. Emerson in 2001, some circuit courts recognized that the Second Amendment protects an individual right to bear arms.

The second, known as the "sophisticated collective right model", held that the Second Amendment recognizes some limited individual right. However, this individual right could be exercised only by actively participating members of a functioning, organized state militia. Some scholars have argued that the "sophisticated collective rights model" is, in fact, the functional equivalent of the "collective rights model". Other commentators have observed that prior to Emerson, five circuit courts specifically endorsed the "sophisticated collective right model".

The third, known as the "standard model", held that the Second Amendment recognized the personal right of individuals to keep and bear arms. Supporters of this model argued that "although the first clause may describe a general purpose for the amendment, the second clause is controlling and therefore the amendment confers an individual right 'of the people' to keep and bear arms". Additionally, scholars who favored this model argued the "absence of founding-era militias mentioned in the Amendment's preamble does not render it a 'dead letter' because the preamble is a 'philosophical declaration' safeguarding militias and is but one of multiple 'civic purposes' for which the Amendment was enacted".

The question of a collective right versus an individual right was progressively resolved in favor of the individual rights model, beginning with the Fifth Circuit ruling in United States v. Emerson (2001), along with the Supreme Court's rulings in District of Columbia v. Heller (2008), and McDonald v. Chicago (2010). In Heller, the Supreme Court resolved any remaining circuit splits by ruling that the Second Amendment protects an individual right. Although the Second Amendment is the only Constitutional amendment with a prefatory clause, such linguistic constructions were widely used elsewhere in the late eighteenth century.

Warren E. Burger, a conservative Republican appointed chief justice of the United States by President Richard Nixon, wrote in 1990 following his retirement:

The Constitution of the United States, in its Second Amendment, guarantees a "right of the people to keep and bear arms". However, the meaning of this clause cannot be understood except by looking to the purpose, the setting and the objectives of the draftsmen ... People of that day were apprehensive about the new "monster" national government presented to them, and this helps explain the language and purpose of the Second Amendment ... We see that the need for a state militia was the predicate of the "right" guaranteed; in short, it was declared "necessary" in order to have a state military force to protect the security of the state.

And in 1991, Burger stated:

If I were writing the Bill of Rights now, there wouldn't be any such thing as the Second Amendment ... that a well regulated militia being necessary for the defense of the state, the peoples' rights to bear arms. This has been the subject of one of the greatest pieces of fraud – I repeat the word 'fraud' – on the American public by special interest groups that I have ever seen in my lifetime.

In a 1992 opinion piece, six former American attorneys general wrote:

For more than 200 years, the federal courts have unanimously determined that the Second Amendment concerns only the arming of the people in service to an organized state militia; it does not guarantee immediate access to guns for private purposes. The nation can no longer afford to let the gun lobby's distortion of the Constitution cripple every reasonable attempt to implement an effective national policy toward guns and crime.

Research by Robert Spitzer found that every law journal article discussing the Second Amendment through 1959 "reflected the Second Amendment affects citizens only in connection with citizen service in a government organized and regulated militia." Only beginning in 1960 did law journal articles begin to advocate an "individualist" view of gun ownership rights. The opposite of this "individualist" view of gun ownership rights is the "collective-right" theory, according to which the amendment protects a collective right of states to maintain militias or an individual right to keep and bear arms in connection with service in a militia (for this view see for example the quote of Justice John Paul Stevens in the Meaning of "well regulated militia" section below). In his book, Six Amendments: How and Why We Should Change the Constitution, Justice John Paul Stevens for example submits the following revised Second Amendment: "A well regulated militia, being necessary to the security of a free state, the right of the people to keep and bear arms when serving in the militia shall not be infringed."

=== Meaning of "well regulated militia" ===
An early use of the phrase "well-regulated militia" may be found in Andrew Fletcher's 1698 A Discourse of Government with Relation to Militias, as well as the phrase "ordinary and ill-regulated militia". Fletcher meant "regular" in the sense of regular military, and advocated the universal conscription and regular training of men of fighting age. Jefferson thought well of Fletcher, commenting that "the political principles of that patriot were worthy the purest periods of the British constitution. They are those which were in vigour."

The term "regulated" means "disciplined" or "trained". In Heller, the U.S. Supreme Court stated that "[t]he adjective 'well-regulated' implies nothing more than the imposition of proper discipline and training."

In the year before the drafting of the Second Amendment, in Federalist No. 29 ("On the Militia"), Alexander Hamilton wrote the following about "organizing", "disciplining", "arming", and "training" of the militia as specified in the enumerated powers:

If a well regulated militia be the most natural defence of a free country, it ought certainly to be under the regulation and at the disposal of that body which is constituted the guardian of the national security ... confiding the regulation of the militia to the direction of the national authority ... [but] reserving to the states ... the authority of training the militia ... A tolerable expertness in military movements is a business that requires time and practice. It is not a day, or even a week, that will suffice for the attainment of it. To oblige the great body of the yeomanry, and of the other classes of the citizens, to be under arms for the purpose of going through military exercises and evolutions, as often as might be necessary to acquire the degree of perfection which would entitle them to the character of a well-regulated militia, would be a real grievance to the people, and a serious public inconvenience and loss ... Little more can reasonably be aimed at, with respect to the People at large, than to have them properly armed and equipped; and in order to see that this be not neglected, it will be necessary to assemble them once or twice in the course of a year.

Justice Scalia, writing for the Court in Heller:

In Nunn v. State, 1 Ga. 243, 251 (1846), the Georgia Supreme Court construed the Second Amendment as protecting the 'natural right of self-defence' and therefore struck down a ban on carrying pistols openly. Its opinion perfectly captured the way in which the operative clause of the Second Amendment furthers the purpose announced in the prefatory clause, in continuity with the English right". ... Nor is the right involved in this discussion less comprehensive or valuable: "The right of the people to bear arms shall not be infringed." The right of the whole people, old and young, men, women and boys, and not militia only, to keep and bear arms of every description, not such merely as are used by the militia, shall not be infringed, curtailed, or broken in upon, in the smallest degree; and all this for the important end to be attained: the rearing up and qualifying a well-regulated militia, so vitally necessary to the security of a free State. Our opinion is, that any law, State or Federal, is repugnant to the Constitution, and void, which contravenes this right, originally belonging to our forefathers, trampled under foot by Charles I. and his two wicked sons and successors, reestablished by the revolution of 1688, conveyed to this land of liberty by the colonists, and finally incorporated conspicuously in our own Magna Charta! And Lexington, Concord, Camden, River Raisin, Sandusky, and the laurel-crowned field of New Orleans, plead eloquently for this interpretation! And the acquisition of Texas may be considered the full fruits of this great constitutional right.

Justice Stevens in dissent:

When each word in the text is given full effect, the Amendment is most naturally read to secure to the people a right to use and possess arms in conjunction with service in a well-regulated militia. So far as appears, no more than that was contemplated by its drafters or is encompassed within its terms. Even if the meaning of the text were genuinely susceptible to more than one interpretation, the burden would remain on those advocating a departure from the purpose identified in the preamble and from settled law to come forward with persuasive new arguments or evidence. The textual analysis offered by respondent and embraced by the Court falls far short of sustaining that heavy burden. And the Court's emphatic reliance on the claim "that the Second Amendment ... codified a pre-existing right," ante, at 19 [refers to p. 19 of the opinion], is of course beside the point because the right to keep and bear arms for service in a state militia was also a pre-existing right.

=== Meaning of "the right of the People" ===
Justice Antonin Scalia, writing for the majority in Heller, stated:

Nowhere else in the Constitution does a "right" attributed to "the people" refer to anything other than an individual right. What is more, in all six other provisions of the Constitution that mention "the people", the term unambiguously refers to all members of the political community, not an unspecified subset. This contrasts markedly with the phrase "the militia" in the prefatory clause. As we will describe below, the "militia" in colonial America consisted of a subset of "the people" – those who were male, able bodied, and within a certain age range. Reading the Second Amendment as protecting only the right to "keep and bear Arms" in an organized militia therefore fits poorly with the operative clause's description of the holder of that right as "the people".

Scalia further specifies who holds this right:

[The Second Amendment] surely elevates above all other interests the right of law-abiding, responsible citizens to use arms in defense of hearth and home.

An earlier case, United States v. Verdugo-Urquidez (1990), dealt with nonresident aliens and the Fourth Amendment, but led to a discussion of who are "the People" when referred to elsewhere in the Constitution:

The Second Amendment protects "the right of the people to keep and bear Arms", and the Ninth and Tenth Amendments provide that certain rights and powers are retained by and reserved to "the people" ... While this textual exegesis is by no means conclusive, it suggests that "the people" protected by the Fourth Amendment, and by the First and Second Amendments, and to whom rights and powers are reserved in the Ninth and Tenth Amendments, refers to a class of persons who are part of a national community or who have otherwise developed sufficient connection with this country to be considered part of that community.

According to the majority in Heller, there were several different reasons for this amendment, and protecting militias was only one of them; if protecting militias had been the only reason then the amendment could have instead referred to "the right of the militia to keep and bear arms" instead of "the right of the people to keep and bear arms".

=== Meaning of "keep and bear arms" ===
In Heller the majority rejected the view that the term "to bear arms" implies only the military use of arms:

Before addressing the verbs "keep" and "bear", we interpret their object: "Arms". The term was applied, then as now, to weapons that were not specifically designed for military use and were not employed in a military capacity. Thus, the most natural reading of "keep Arms" in the Second Amendment is to "have weapons". At the time of the founding, as now, to "bear" meant to "carry". In numerous instances, "bear arms" was unambiguously used to refer to the carrying of weapons outside of an organized militia. Nine state constitutional provisions written in the 18th century or the first two decades of the 19th, which enshrined a right of citizens "bear arms in defense of themselves and the state" again, in the most analogous linguistic context – that "bear arms" was not limited to the carrying of arms in a militia. The phrase "bear Arms" also had at the time of the founding an idiomatic meaning that was significantly different from its natural meaning: "to serve as a soldier, do military service, fight" or "to wage war". But it unequivocally bore that idiomatic meaning only when followed by the preposition "against". Every example given by petitioners' amici for the idiomatic meaning of "bear arms" from the founding period either includes the preposition "against" or is not clearly idiomatic. In any event, the meaning of "bear arms" that petitioners and Justice Stevens propose is not even the (sometimes) idiomatic meaning. Rather, they manufacture a hybrid definition, whereby "bear arms" connotes the actual carrying of arms (and therefore is not really an idiom) but only in the service of an organized militia. No dictionary has ever adopted that definition, and we have been apprised of no source that indicates that it carried that meaning at the time of the founding. Worse still, the phrase "keep and bear Arms" would be incoherent. The word "Arms" would have two different meanings at once: "weapons" (as the object of "keep") and (as the object of "bear") one-half of an idiom. It would be rather like saying "He filled and kicked the bucket" to mean "He filled the bucket and died."

In a dissent, joined by justices Souter, Ginsburg, and Breyer, Justice Stevens said:

The Amendment's text does justify a different limitation: the "right to keep and bear arms" protects only a right to possess and use firearms in connection with service in a state-organized militia. Had the Framers wished to expand the meaning of the phrase "bear arms" to encompass civilian possession and use, they could have done so by the addition of phrases such as "for the defense of themselves".

A May 2018 analysis by Dennis Baron contradicted the majority opinion:

A search of Brigham Young University's new online Corpus of Founding Era American English, with more than 95,000 texts and 138 million words, yields 281 instances of the phrase "bear arms". BYU's Corpus of Early Modern English, with 40,000 texts and close to 1.3 billion words, shows 1,572 instances of the phrase. Subtracting about 350 duplicate matches, that leaves about 1,500 separate occurrences of "bear arms" in the 17th and 18th centuries, and only a handful don't refer to war, soldiering or organized, armed action. These databases confirm that the natural meaning of "bear arms" in the framers' day was military.

A paper from 2008 found that before 1820, the use of the phrase "bear arms" was commonly used in a civilian context, such as hunting and personal self-defense, in both American and British law. One scholar suggests that the right to "keep and bear arms" further includes a right to privately manufacture firearms.

== Analysis of grammar and syntax ==
The Second Amendment is viewed by scholars as divided into two clauses, a prefatory clause, and an operative clause.

The prefatory clause includes the text:

A well regulated Militia, being necessary to the security of a free State,

Followed by the operative clause:

the right of the people to keep and bear Arms, shall not be infringed.

Under the standard model, the prefatory clause is understood to be merely amplifying the operative clause. The prefatory clause was meant as a non-exclusive example – one of many justifications for the Second Amendment. This interpretation is consistent with the position that the Second Amendment protects an individual right.

Under the collective right models, the prefatory clause was considered essential as a pre-condition for the main clause. This interpretation claimed that this was a grammar structure common during the era the Second Amendment was written and that this grammar dictated that the Second Amendment protected a collective right to firearms to the extent necessary for militia duty. Many linguistic scholars reject this interpretation of the grammar and syntax, asserting, "...that the prefatory clause is neither internal nor conditional; instead, it's temporal and external, meaning the opening words introduce its context and purpose."

The comma between the word "Arms" and "shall" also has been involved in debate centered around the meaning and interpretation of this one comma between the two words. Some argue that "...long-standing British tradition minimized punctuation's effect on laws" and that therefore this comma has little significance on the real meaning of the Second Amendment.

The Second Amendment uses "passive voice" in its language as opposed to "active voice." Only the First Amendment to the United States Constitution uses "active voice" ("Congress shall make no law"). Debate around whom the Second Amendment applies to has also centered around this "passive voice" used in its wording. A Reason magazine analysis from January 2025 stated on the subject of the "passive" versus "active" voice used in the Second Amendment that:

The Bill of Rights' passive voice consistently elevates one object: individual rights. As for the subject, the Framers could neither specify nor predict what or who could infringe upon said rights. Thus, the Constitution, especially following the 14th Amendment's ratification, safeguards these rights from an exhaustive catalog of unscrupulous subjects—namely, state actors (e.g., cops, Congress, presidents, judges, city councils, etc.) that could violate these freedoms.

== Supreme Court cases ==
In the century following the ratification of the Bill of Rights, the intended meaning and application of the Second Amendment drew less interest than it does in modern times. The vast majority of regulation was done by states, and the first case law on weapons regulation dealt with state interpretations of the Second Amendment. A notable exception to this general rule was Houston v. Moore, 18 U.S. 1 (1820), where the U.S. Supreme Court mentioned the Second Amendment in an aside. (Note: Justice Story "misidentified" it as the "5th Amendment". Several public officials, including James Madison and Supreme Court Justice Joseph Story, retained the confusing practice of referring to each of the ten amendments in the Bill of Rights by the enumeration found in the first draft; the fifth article is the Second Amendment.) In the Dred Scott decision (1857), the opinion of the court stated that if African Americans were considered U.S. citizens, "It would give to persons of the negro race, who were recognised as citizens in any one State of the Union, the right ... to keep and carry arms wherever they went."

State and federal courts historically have used two models to interpret the Second Amendment: the "individual rights" model, which holds that individuals hold the right to bear arms, and the "collective rights" model, which holds that the right is dependent on militia membership. The "collective rights" model has been rejected by the Supreme Court, in favor of the individual rights model, beginning with its District of Columbia v. Heller (2008) decision.

The Supreme Court's primary Second Amendment cases include United States v. Miller, (1939); District of Columbia v. Heller (2008); and McDonald v. Chicago (2010).

Heller and McDonald supported the individual rights model, under which the Second Amendment protects the right to keep and bear arms much as the First Amendment protects the right to free speech. Under this model, the militia is composed of members who supply their own arms and ammunition. This is generally recognized as the method by which militias have historically been armed, as the Supreme Court in Miller said:

The signification attributed to the term Militia appears from the debates in the Convention, the history and legislation of Colonies and States, and the writings of approved commentators. These show plainly enough that the Militia comprised all males physically capable of acting in concert for the common defense. 'A body of citizens enrolled for military discipline.' And further, that ordinarily when called for service these men were expected to appear bearing arms supplied by themselves and of the kind in common use at the time.

Of the collective rights model that holds that the right to arms is based on militia membership, the Supreme Court in Heller said:

A purposive qualifying phrase that contradicts the word or phrase it modifies is unknown this side of the looking glass (except, apparently, in some courses on Linguistics). If "bear arms" means, as we think, simply the carrying of arms, a modifier can limit the purpose of the carriage ("for the purpose of self-defense" or "to make war against the King"). But if "bear arms" means, as the petitioners and the dissent think, the carrying of arms only for military purposes, one simply cannot add "for the purpose of killing game". The right "to carry arms in the militia for the purpose of killing game" is worthy of the mad hatter.

=== United States v. Cruikshank ===
In the Reconstruction Era case of United States v. Cruikshank, 92 U.S. 542 (1875), the defendants were white men who had killed more than sixty black people in what was known as the Colfax massacre and had been charged with conspiring to prevent blacks from exercising their right to bear arms. The Court dismissed the charges, holding that the Bill of Rights restricted Congress but not private individuals. The Court concluded, "[f]or their protection in its enjoyment, the people must look to the States."

The Court stated that "[t]he Second Amendment ... has no other effect than to restrict the powers of the national government ..." Likewise, the Court held that there was no state action in this case, and therefore the Fourteenth Amendment was not applicable:

The fourteenth amendment prohibits a State from depriving any person of life, liberty, or property, without due process of law; but this adds nothing to the rights of one citizen as against another.

Thus, the Court held a federal anti-Ku-Klux-Klan statute to be unconstitutional as applied in that case.

=== Presser v. Illinois ===
In Presser v. Illinois, 116 U.S. 252 (1886), Herman Presser headed a German-American paramilitary shooting organization and was arrested for leading a parade group of 400 men, training and drilling with military weapons with the declared intention to fight, through the streets of Chicago as a violation of Illinois law that prohibited public drilling and parading in military style without a permit from the governor.

At his trial, Presser argued that the State of Illinois had violated his Second Amendment rights. The Supreme Court reaffirmed Cruikshank, and also held that the Second Amendment prevented neither the States nor Congress from barring private militias that parade with arms; such a right "cannot be claimed as a right independent of law". This decision upheld the States' authority to regulate the militia and that citizens had no right to create their own militias or to own weapons for semi-military purposes. The Court however observed with respect to the reach of the Amendment on the national government and the federal states and the role of the people therin: "It is undoubtedly true that all citizens capable of bearing arms constitute the reserved military force or reserve militia of the United States as well as of the states, and, in view of this prerogative of the general government, as well as of its general powers, the states cannot, even laying the constitutional provision in question out of view, prohibit the people from keeping and bearing arms so as to deprive the United States of their rightful resource for maintaining the public security, and disable the people from performing their duty to the general government." In essence the court said: "A state cannot prohibit the people therein from keeping and bearing arms to an extent that would deprive the United States of the protection afforded by them as a reserve military force."

=== Miller v. Texas ===
In Miller v. Texas, 153 U.S. 535 (1894), Franklin Miller was convicted and sentenced to be executed for shooting a police officer to death with an illegally carried handgun in violation of Texas law. Miller sought to have his conviction overturned, claiming his Second Amendment rights were violated and that the Bill of Rights should be applied to state law. The Supreme Court ruled that the Second Amendment did not apply to state laws such as the Texas law, writing: "As the proceedings were conducted under the ordinary forms of criminal prosecutions there certainly was no denial of due process of law."

=== Robertson v. Baldwin ===
In Robertson v. Baldwin, 165 U.S. 275 (1897), the Supreme Court stated in dicta that "the right of the people to keep and bear arms (Art. II) is not infringed by laws prohibiting the carrying of concealed weapons."

=== United States v. Schwimmer ===
United States v. Schwimmer, 279 U.S. 644 (1929), concerned a pacifist applicant for naturalization who in the interview declared not to be willing to "take up arms personally" in defense of the United States. The Supreme Court cited the Second Amendment indirectly by declaring that the United States Constitution obliges citizens "to defend our government against all enemies whenever necessity arises is a fundamental principle of the Constitution" and by declaring further that the "common defense was one of the purposes for which the people ordained and established the Constitution."

=== United States v. Miller ===
In United States v. Miller, 307 U.S. 174 (1939), the Supreme Court rejected a Second Amendment challenge to the National Firearms Act prohibiting the interstate transportation of unregistered Title II weapons:

Jack Miller and Frank Layton "did unlawfully ... transport in interstate commerce from ... Claremore ... Oklahoma to ... Siloam Springs ... Arkansas a certain firearm ... a double barrel ... shotgun having a barrel less than 18 inches in length ... at the time of so transporting said firearm in interstate commerce ... not having registered said firearm as required by Section 1132d of Title 26, United States Code ... and not having in their possession a stamp-affixed written order ... as provided by Section 1132C ..."

In a unanimous opinion authored by Justice McReynolds, the Supreme Court stated "the objection that the Act usurps police power reserved to the States is plainly untenable." As the Court explained:

In the absence of any evidence tending to show that possession or use of a 'shotgun having a barrel of less than eighteen inches in length' at this time has some reasonable relationship to any preservation or efficiency of a well regulated militia, we cannot say that the Second Amendment guarantees the right to keep and bear such an instrument. Certainly it is not within judicial notice that this weapon is any part of the ordinary military equipment or that its use could contribute to the common defense.

Gun rights advocates claim that the Court in Miller ruled that the Second Amendment protected the right to keep arms that are part of "ordinary military equipment". They also claim that the Court did not consider the question of whether the sawed-off shotgun in the case would be an applicable weapon for personal defense, instead looking solely at the weapon's suitability for the "common defense". Law professor Andrew McClurg states, "The only certainty about Miller is that it failed to give either side a clear-cut victory. Most modern scholars recognize this fact."

=== District of Columbia v. Heller ===
==== Judgment ====
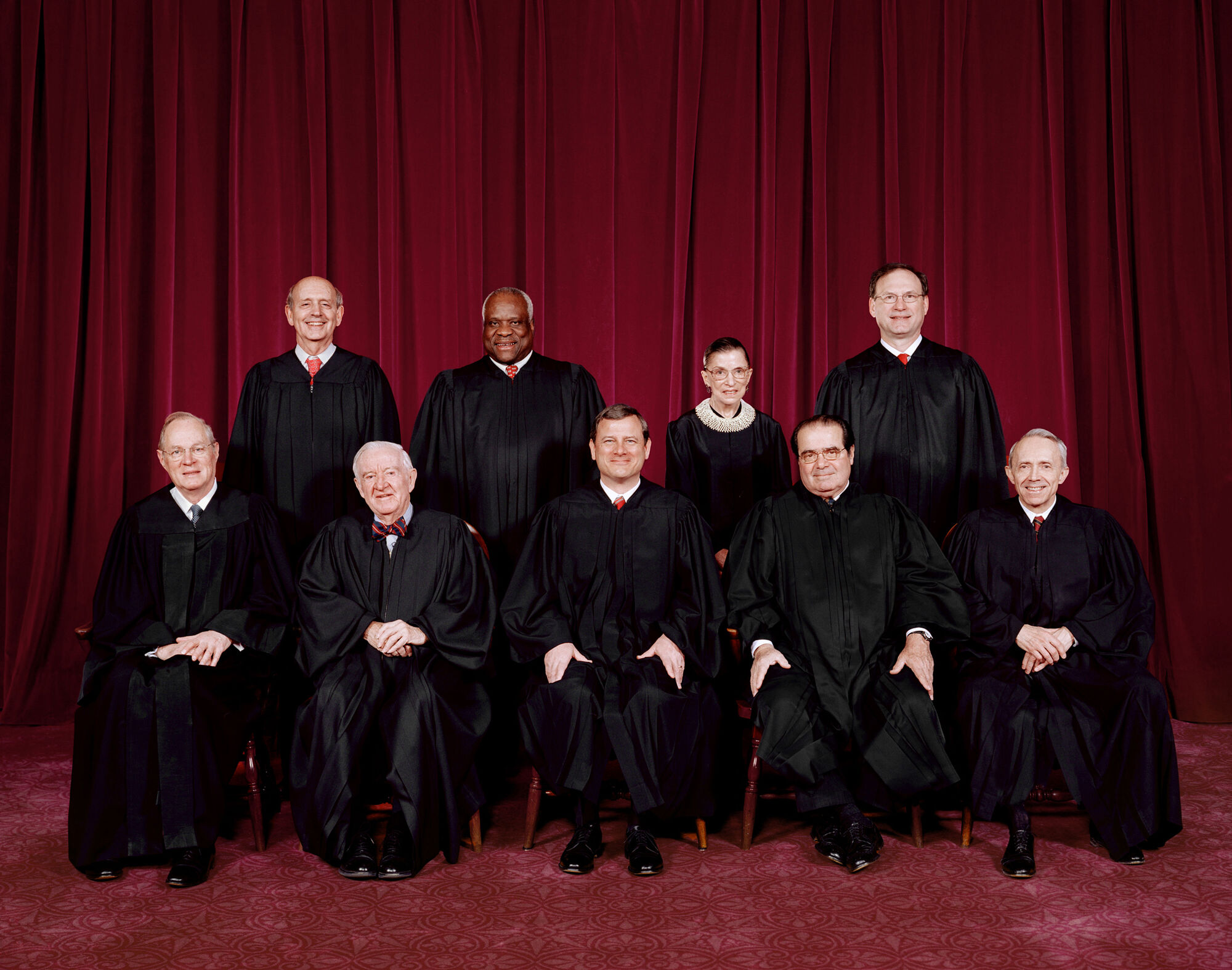
The justices who decided Heller

According to the syllabus prepared by the U.S. Supreme Court Reporter of Decisions, in District of Columbia v. Heller, 554 U.S. 570 (2008), the Supreme Court held:

1. The Second Amendment protects an individual right to possess a firearm unconnected with service in a militia, and to use that arm for traditionally lawful purposes, such as self-defense within the home. pp. 2–53.
  1. The Amendment's prefatory clause announces a purpose, but does not limit or expand the scope of the second part, the operative clause. The operative clause's text and history demonstrate that it connotes an individual right to keep and bear arms. pp. 2–22.
  2. The prefatory clause comports with the Court's interpretation of the operative clause. The "militia" comprised all males physically capable of acting in concert for the common defense. The Antifederalists feared that the Federal Government would disarm the people in order to disable this citizens' militia, enabling a politicized standing army or a select militia to rule. The response was to deny Congress power to abridge the ancient right of individuals to keep and bear arms, so that the ideal of a citizens' militia would be preserved. pp. 22–28.
  3. The Court's interpretation is confirmed by analogous arms-bearing rights in state constitutions that preceded and immediately followed the Second Amendment. pp. 28–30.
  4. The Second Amendment's drafting history, while of dubious interpretive worth, reveals three state Second Amendment proposals that unequivocally referred to an individual right to bear arms. pp. 30–32.
  5. Interpretation of the Second Amendment by scholars, courts and legislators, from immediately after its ratification through the late 19th century also supports the Court's conclusion. pp. 32–47.
  6. None of the Court's precedents forecloses the Court's interpretation. Neither United States v. Cruikshank, 92 U.S. 542, nor Presser v. Illinois, 116 U.S. 252, refutes the individual-rights interpretation. United States v. Miller, 307 U.S. 174, does not limit the right to keep and bear arms to militia purposes, but rather limits the type of weapon to which the right applies to those used by the militia, i.e., those in common use for lawful purposes. pp. 47–54.
2. Like most rights, the Second Amendment right is not unlimited. It is not a right to keep and carry any weapon whatsoever in any manner whatsoever and for whatever purpose: For example, concealed weapons prohibitions have been upheld under the Amendment or state analogues. The Court's opinion should not be taken to cast doubt on longstanding prohibitions on the possession of firearms by felons and the mentally ill, or laws forbidding the carrying of firearms in sensitive places such as schools and government buildings, or laws imposing conditions and qualifications on the commercial sale of arms. Miller's holding that the sorts of weapons protected are those "in common use at the time" finds support in the historical tradition of prohibiting the carrying of dangerous and unusual weapons. pp. 54–56.
3. The handgun ban and the trigger-lock requirement (as applied to self-defense) violate the Second Amendment. The District's total ban on handgun possession in the home amounts to a prohibition on an entire class of "arms" that Americans overwhelmingly choose for the lawful purpose of self-defense. Under any of the standards of scrutiny the Court has applied to enumerated constitutional rights, this prohibition – in the place where the importance of the lawful defense of self, family, and property is most acute – would fail constitutional muster. Similarly, the requirement that any lawful firearm in the home be disassembled or bound by a trigger lock makes it impossible for citizens to use arms for the core lawful purpose of self-defense and is hence unconstitutional. Because Heller conceded at oral argument that the D. C. licensing law is permissible if it is not enforced arbitrarily and capriciously, the Court assumes that a license will satisfy his prayer for relief and does not address the licensing requirement. Assuming he is not disqualified from exercising Second Amendment rights, the District must permit Heller to register his handgun and must issue him a license to carry it in the home. pp. 56–64.

The Heller court also stated (Heller, 554 U.S. 570 (2008), at 632) its analysis should not be read to suggest "the invalidity of laws regulating the storage of firearms to prevent accidents." The Supreme Court also defined the term arms used in the Second Amendment. "Arms" covered by the Second Amendment were defined in District of Columbia v. Heller to include "any thing that a man wears for his defence, or takes into his hands, or useth in wrath to cast at or strike another". 554 U. S., at 581." The Michigan Court of Appeals 2012 relied on Heller in the case People v. Yanna to state certain limitations on the right to keep and bear arms:

In some respects, these limitations are consistent with each other. However, they are not identical, and the United States Supreme Court neither fully harmonized them nor elevated one over another. First, the Court stated that "the Second Amendment does not protect those weapons not typically possessed by law-abiding citizens for lawful purposes." Id. at 625, 128 S.Ct. 2783. The Court further stated that "the sorts of weapons protected were those 'in common use at the time.'" Id. at 627, 128 S.Ct. 2783 (citation omitted). As noted, however, this included weapons that did not exist when the Second Amendment was enacted. Id. at 582, 128 S.Ct. 2783. Third, the Court referred to "the historical tradition of prohibiting the carrying of 'dangerous and unusual weapons.'" Id. at 627, 128 S.Ct. 2783 (citation omitted).

There are similar legal summaries of the Supreme Court's findings in Heller as the one quoted above. For example, the Illinois Supreme Court in People v. Aguilar (2013), summed up Heller's findings and reasoning:

In District of Columbia v. Heller, 554 U.S. 570 (2008), the Supreme Court undertook its first-ever "in-depth examination" of the second amendment's meaning Id. at 635. After a lengthy historical discussion, the Court ultimately concluded that the second amendment "guarantee[s] the individual right to possess and carry weapons in case of confrontation" (id. at 592); that "central to" this right is "the inherent right of self-defense" (id. at 628); that "the home" is "where the need for defense of self, family, and property is most acute" (id. at 628); and that, "above all other interests", the second amendment elevates "the right of law-abiding, responsible citizens to use arms in defense of hearth and home" (id. at 635). Based on this understanding, the Court held that a District of Columbia law banning handgun possession in the home violated the second amendment Id. at 635.

==== Notes and analysis ====
Heller has been widely described as a landmark decision because it was the first time the Court affirmed an individual's right to own a gun. To clarify that its ruling does not invalidate a broad range of existing firearm laws, the majority opinion, written by Justice Antonin Scalia, said:

Like most rights, the right secured by the Second Amendment is not unlimited ... Although we do not undertake an exhaustive historical analysis today of the full scope of the Second Amendment, nothing in our opinion should be taken to cast doubt on longstanding prohibitions on the possession of firearms by felons and the mentally ill, or laws forbidding the carrying of firearms in sensitive places such as schools and government buildings, or laws imposing conditions and qualifications on the commercial sale of arms.

The Court's statement that the right secured by the Second Amendment is limited has been widely discussed by lower courts and the media. According to Justice John Paul Stevens he was able to persuade Justice Anthony M. Kennedy to ask for "some important changes" to Justice Scalia's opinion, so it was Justice Kennedy, who was needed to secure a fifth vote in Heller, "who requested that the opinion include language stating that Heller 'should not be taken to cast doubt' on many existing gun laws." The majority opinion also said that the amendment's prefatory clause (referencing the "militia") serves to clarify the operative clause (referencing "the people"), but does not limit the scope of the operative clause, because "the 'militia' in colonial America consisted of a subset of 'the people'. ... "

Justice Stevens' dissenting opinion, which was joined by the three other dissenters, said:

The question presented by this case is not whether the Second Amendment protects a "collective right" or an "individual right". Surely it protects a right that can be enforced by individuals. But a conclusion that the Second Amendment protects an individual right does not tell us anything about the scope of that right.

Stevens went on to say the following:

The Second Amendment was adopted to protect the right of the people of each of the several States to maintain a well-regulated militia. It was a response to concerns raised during the ratification of the Constitution that the power of Congress to disarm the state militias and create a national standing army posed an intolerable threat to the sovereignty of the several States. Neither the text of the Amendment nor the arguments advanced by its proponents evidenced the slightest interest in limiting any legislature's authority to regulate private civilian uses of firearms. Specifically, there is no indication that the Framers of the Amendment intended to enshrine the common-law right of self-defense in the Constitution.

This dissent called the majority opinion "strained and unpersuasive" and said that the right to possess a firearm exists only in relation to the militia and that the D.C. laws constitute permissible regulation. In the majority opinion, Justice Stevens' interpretation of the phrase "to keep and bear arms" was referred to as a "hybrid" definition that Stevens purportedly chose in order to avoid an "incoherent" and "[g]rotesque" idiomatic meeting.

Justice Breyer, in his own dissent joined by Stevens, Souter, and Ginsburg, stated that the entire Court subscribes to the proposition that "the amendment protects an 'individual' right – i.e., one that is separately possessed, and may be separately enforced, by each person on whom it is conferred".

Regarding the term "well regulated", the majority opinion said, "The adjective 'well-regulated' implies nothing more than the imposition of proper discipline and training." The majority opinion quoted Spooner from The Unconstitutionality of Slavery as saying that the right to bear arms was necessary for those who wanted to take a stand against slavery. The majority opinion also stated that:

A purposive qualifying phrase that contradicts the word or phrase it modifies is unknown this side of the looking glass (except, apparently, in some courses on Linguistics). If "bear arms" means, as we think, simply the carrying of arms, a modifier can limit the purpose of the carriage ("for the purpose of self-defense" or "to make war against the King"). But if "bear arms" means, as the petitioners and the dissent think, the carrying of arms only for military purposes, one simply cannot add "for the purpose of killing game". The right "to carry arms in the militia for the purpose of killing game" is worthy of the mad hatter.

The dissenting justices were not persuaded by this argument.

Reaction to Heller has varied, with many sources giving focus to the ruling referring to itself as being the first in Supreme Court history to read the Second Amendment as protecting an individual right. The majority opinion, authored by Justice Scalia, gives explanation of the majority legal reasoning behind this decision. The majority opinion made clear that the recent ruling did not foreclose the Court's prior interpretations given in United States v. Cruikshank, Presser v. Illinois, and United States v. Miller though these earlier rulings did not limit the right to keep and bear arms solely to militia purposes, but rather limits the type of weapon to which the right applies to those used by the militia (i.e., those in common use for lawful purposes).

Heller pertained to three District of Columbia ordinances involving restrictions on firearms amounting to a total ban. These three ordinances were a ban on handgun registration, a requirement that all firearms in a home be either disassembled or have a trigger lock, and licensing requirement that prohibits carrying an unlicensed firearm in the home, such as from one room to another:

Under any of the standards of scrutiny the Court has applied to enumerated constitutional rights, this prohibition – in the place where the importance of the lawful defense of self, family, and property is most acute – would fail constitutional muster. ... Because Heller conceded at oral argument that the District's licensing law is permissible if it is not enforced arbitrarily and capriciously, the Court assumed that a license will satisfy his prayer for relief and did not address the licensing requirement. Assuming he is not disqualified from exercising Second Amendment rights, the District must permit Heller to register his handgun and must issue him a license to carry it in the home."

Justice Ginsburg was a vocal critic of Heller. Speaking in an interview on public radio station WNYC, she called the Second Amendment "outdated", saying:

When we no longer need people to keep muskets in their home, then the Second Amendment has no function ... If the Court had properly interpreted the Second Amendment, the Court would have said that amendment was very important when the nation was new; it gave a qualified right to keep and bear arms, but it was for one purpose only – and that was the purpose of having militiamen who were able to fight to preserve the nation.

According to adjunct professor of law at Duquesne University School of Law Anthony Picadio, who said he's not anti-gun but rather "anti-bad-judging", Justice Scalia's reasoning in Heller is the product of an erroneous reading of colonial history and the drafting history of the Second Amendment. He argued that the Southern slave states would never have ratified the Second Amendment if it had been understood as creating an individual right to own firearms because of their fear of arming free blacks. After a lengthy historical and legal analysis Anthony Picadio concluded: "If the Second Amendment had been understood to have the meaning given to it by Justice Scalia, it would not have been ratified by Virginia and the other slave states." Picadio pointed out that the right acknowledged in Heller was not originally to be an enumerated right. Instead, he argues, there would be more respect for the Heller decision, if the right acknowledged in Heller would have been forthrightly classified as an unenumerated right and if the issue in Heller would have been analysed under the Ninth Amendment to the United States Constitution. He finished with the following observation: "The pre-existing right that the Heller Court incorporated into the Second Amendment is very narrow. As recognized by Justice Alito in the McDonald case, it protects only "the right to possess a handgun in the house for the purposes of self-defense." This narrow right has never been extended by the Supreme Court."

=== McDonald v. City of Chicago ===
On June 28, 2010, the Court in McDonald v. City of Chicago, 561 U.S. 742 (2010), held that the Second Amendment was incorporated, saying that "[i]t is clear that the Framers and ratifiers of the Fourteenth Amendment counted the right to keep and bear arms among those fundamental rights necessary to our system of ordered liberty." This means that the Court ruled that the Second Amendment limits state and local governments to the same extent that it limits the federal government. It also remanded a case regarding a Chicago handgun prohibition. Four of the five justices in the majority voted to do so by way of the Due Process Clause of the Fourteenth Amendment, while the fifth justice, Clarence Thomas, voted to do so through the amendment's Privileges or Immunities Clause. In United States v. Rahimi (2024) the Supreme Court stated "that the right to keep and bear arms is among the "fundamental rights necessary to our system of ordered liberty." McDonald v. Chicago, 561 U. S. 742, 778 (2010)."

Justice Thomas, in his concurring opinion, noted that the Privileges or Immunities Clause refers to "citizens" whereas the Due Process Clause refers more broadly to any "person", and therefore Thomas reserved the issue of non-citizens for later decision. After McDonald, many questions about the Second Amendment remain unsettled, such as whether non-citizens are protected through the Equal Protection Clause.

In People v. Aguilar (2013), the Illinois Supreme Court summed up the central Second Amendment findings in McDonald:

Two years later, in McDonald v. City of Chicago, 561 U.S. 742, ___, 130 S. Ct. 3020, 3050 (2010), the Supreme Court held that the second amendment right recognized in Heller is applicable to the states through the due process clause of the fourteenth amendment. In so holding, the Court reiterated that "the Second Amendment protects the right to keep and bear arms for the purpose of self-defense" (id. at ___, 130 S. Ct. at 3026); that "individual self-defense is 'the central component' of the Second Amendment right" (emphasis in original) (id. at ___, 130 S. Ct. at 3036 (quoting Heller, 554 U.S. at 599)); and that "[s]elf-defense is a basic right, recognized by many legal systems from ancient times to the present day" (id. at ___, 130 S. Ct. at 3036).

=== Caetano v. Massachusetts ===
On March 21, 2016, in a per curiam decision the Court vacated a Massachusetts Supreme Judicial Court decision upholding the conviction of a woman who carried a stun gun for self-defense. The Court reiterated that the Heller and McDonald decisions saying that "the Second Amendment extends, prima facie, to all instruments that constitute bearable arms, even those that were not in existence at the time of the founding", that "the Second Amendment right is fully applicable to the States", and that the protection is not restricted to "only those weapons useful in warfare". The term "bearable arms" was defined in District of Columbia v. Heller, 554 U.S. 570 (2008) and includes not only firearms, but any "[w]eapo[n] of offence" or "thing that a man wears for his defence, or takes into his hands", that is "carr[ied] ... for the purpose of offensive or defensive action". 554 U. S., at 581, 584 (internal quotation marks omitted)."

=== New York State Rifle & Pistol Association, Inc. v. City of New York, New York ===
The Court heard New York State Rifle & Pistol Association Inc. v. City of New York, New York on December 2, 2019, to decide whether a New York City ordinance that prevents the transport of guns, even if properly unloaded and locked in containers, from within city limits to outside of the city limits is unconstitutional. The New York Rifle & Pistol Association challenged the ordinance on the basis of the Second Amendment, the Dormant Commerce Clause, and the right to travel. However, as the city had changed its rule to allow transport while the case was under consideration by the Court, the Court ruled the case moot in April 2020, though it remanded the case so the lower courts could review the new rules under the petitioners new claims.

=== New York State Rifle & Pistol Association, Inc. v. Bruen ===
New York law prohibits the concealed carry of firearms without a permit. The issuance of such permits was previously at the discretion of state authorities, and permits were not issued absent 'proper cause'. The New York State Rifle & Pistol Association and two individuals who had been denied permits on the grounds that they lacked proper cause, challenged the licensing regime as a violation of the Second Amendment, with the District Court and the Second Circuit Court of Appeals ruling in favor of the state. The Supreme Court ruled on June 23, 2022, in a 6–3 decision that the New York law, as a "may-issue" regulation, was unconstitutional, affirming that public possession of firearms was a protected right under the Second Amendment. The majority stated that states may still regulate firearms through "shall-issue" regulations that use objective measures such as background checks. In its June 2024 United States v. Rahimi decision, the Court refined the Bruen test, stating that in comparing modern gun control laws to historic tradition, courts should use similar analogues and general principles rather than strict matches.

== United States Courts of Appeals decisions before and after Heller ==
=== Before Heller ===
Until District of Columbia v. Heller (2008), United States v. Miller (1939) had been the only Supreme Court decision that "tested a congressional enactment against [the Second Amendment]". Miller did not directly mention either a collective or individual right, but for the 62-year period from Miller until the Fifth Circuit's decision in United States v. Emerson (2001), federal courts recognized only the collective right, with "courts increasingly referring to one another's holdings ... without engaging in any appreciably substantive legal analysis of the issue".

Emerson changed this by addressing the question in depth, with the Fifth Circuit determining that the Second Amendment protects an individual right. Subsequently, the Ninth Circuit conflicted with Emerson in Silveira v. Lockyer, and the D.C. Circuit supported Emerson in Parker v. District of Columbia. Parker evolved into District of Columbia v. Heller, in which the U.S. Supreme Court determined that the Second Amendment protects an individual right.

=== After Heller ===
Since Heller, the United States courts of appeals have ruled on many Second Amendment challenges to convictions and gun control laws.

==== D.C. Circuit ====
- Heller v. District of Columbia, Civil Action No. 08-1289 (RMU), No. 23., 25 – On March 26, 2010, the D.C. Circuit denied the follow-up appeal of Dick Heller who requested the court to overturn the new District of Columbia gun control ordinances newly enacted after the 2008 Heller ruling. The court refused to do so, stating that the firearms registration procedures, the prohibition on assault weapons, and the prohibition on large capacity ammunition feeding devices were found to not violate the Second Amendment. On September 18, 2015, the D.C. Circuit ruled that requiring gun owners to re-register a gun every three years, make a gun available for inspection or pass a test about firearms laws violated the Second Amendment, although the court upheld requirements that gun owners be fingerprinted, photographed, and complete a safety training course.
- Wrenn v. District of Columbia, No. 16-7025 – On July 25, 2017, the D.C. Circuit ruled that a District of Columbia regulation that limited conceal-carry licenses only to those individuals who could demonstrate, to the satisfaction of the chief of police, that they have a "good reason" to carry a handgun in public was essentially designed to prevent the exercise of the right to bear arms by most District residents and so violated the Second Amendment by amounting to a complete prohibition on firearms possession.

==== First Circuit ====
- United States v. Rene E., 583 F.3 d 8 (1st Cir. 2009 ) – On August 31, 2009, the First Circuit affirmed the conviction of a juvenile for the illegal possession of a handgun as a juvenile, under 18 U.S.C. § 922(x)(2)(A) and 18 U.S.C. § 5032, rejecting the defendant's argument that the federal law violated his Second Amendment rights under Heller. The court cited "the existence of a longstanding tradition of prohibiting juveniles from both receiving and possessing handguns" and observed "the federal ban on juvenile possession of handguns is part of a longstanding practice of prohibiting certain classes of individuals from possessing firearms – those whose possession poses a particular danger to the public."

==== Second Circuit ====
- Kachalsky v. County of Westchester, 11-3942 – On November 28, 2012, the Second Circuit upheld New York's may-issue concealed carry permit law, ruling that "the proper cause requirement is substantially related to New York's compelling interests in public safety and crime prevention."

==== Third Circuit ====
- Range v. Attorney General of the United States, Civil Action No. 21-2835 – On June 6, 2023, the Third Circuit ruled that the Second Amendment prohibited a lifetime ban on firearms possession as a result of a conviction for a nonviolent crime.

==== Fourth Circuit ====
- United States v. Hall, 551 F.3 d 257 (4th Cir. 2009 ) – On August 4, 2008, the Fourth Circuit upheld as constitutional the prohibition of possession of a concealed weapon without a permit.
- United States v. Chester, 628 F.3d 673 (4th Cir. 2010) – On December 30, 2010, the Fourth Circuit vacated William Chester's conviction for possession of a firearm after having been convicted of a misdemeanor crime of domestic violence, in violation of 18 U.S.C. § 922(g)(9). The court found that the district court erred in perfunctorily relying on Heller's exception for "presumptively lawful" gun regulations made in accordance with "longstanding prohibitions".
- Kolbe v. Hogan, No. 14-1945 (4th Cir. 2016) – On February 4, 2016, the Fourth Circuit vacated a U.S. District Court decision upholding a Maryland law banning so called "high-capacity" magazines and semi-automatic rifles, ruling that the District Court was wrong to have applied intermediate scrutiny. The Fourth Circuit ruled that the higher strict scrutiny standard is to be applied on remand. On March 4, 2016, the court agreed to rehear the case en banc on May 11, 2016.

==== Fifth Circuit ====
- United States v. Dorosan, 350 Fed. Appx. 874 (5th Cir. 2009) – On June 30, 2008, the Fifth Circuit upheld 39 CFR 232.1, which bans weapons on postal property, sustaining restrictions on guns outside the home, specifically in private vehicles parked in employee parking lots of government facilities, despite Second Amendment claims that were dismissed. The employee's Second Amendment rights were not infringed since the employee could have instead parked across the street in a public parking lot, instead of on government property.
- United States v. Bledsoe, 334 Fed. Appx. 771 (5th Cir. 2009) – The Fifth Circuit affirmed the decision of a U.S. District Court decision in Texas, upholding 18 U.S.C. § 922(a)(6), which prohibits "straw purchases". A "straw purchase" occurs when someone eligible to purchase a firearm buys one for an ineligible person. Additionally, the court rejected the request for a strict scrutiny standard of review.
- United States v. Scroggins, 551 F.3 d 257 (5th Cir. 2010 ) – On March 4, 2010, the Fifth Circuit affirmed the conviction of Ernie Scroggins for possession of a firearm as a convicted felon, in violation of 18 U.S.C. § 922(g)(1). The court noted that it had, prior to Heller, identified the Second Amendment as providing an individual right to bear arms, and had already, likewise, determined that restrictions on felon ownership of firearms did not violate this right. Moreover, it observed that Heller did not affect the longstanding prohibition of firearm possession by felons.

==== Sixth Circuit ====
- Tyler v. Hillsdale Co. Sheriff's Dept., 775 F.3 d 308 (6th Cir. 2014 ) – On December 18, 2014, the Sixth Circuit ruled that strict scrutiny should be applied to firearms regulations when regulations burden "conduct that falls within the scope of the Second Amendment right, as historically understood". At issue in this case was whether the Second Amendment is violated by a provision of the Gun Control Act of 1968 that prohibits possession of a firearm by a person who has been involuntarily committed to a psychiatric hospital. The court did not rule on the provision's constitutionality, instead remanding the case to the United States district court that has earlier heard this case. On April 21, 2015, the Sixth Circuit voted to rehear the case en banc, thereby vacating the December 18 opinion.

==== Seventh Circuit ====
- United States v. Skoien, 587 F.3 d 803 (7th Cir. 2009 ) – Steven Skoien, a Wisconsin man convicted of two misdemeanor domestic violence convictions, appealed his conviction based on the argument that the prohibition violated the individual rights to bear arms, as described in Heller. After initial favorable rulings in lower court based on a standard of intermediate scrutiny, on July 13, 2010, the Seventh Circuit, sitting en banc, ruled 10–1 against Skoien and reinstated his conviction for a gun violation, citing the strong relation between the law in question and the government objective. Skoien was convicted and sentenced to two years in prison for the gun violation, and will thus likely be subject to a lifetime ban on gun ownership. Editorials favoring gun rights sharply criticized this ruling as going too far with the enactment of a lifetime gun ban, while editorials favoring gun regulations praised the ruling as "a bucket of cold water thrown on the 'gun rights' celebration".
- Moore v. Madigan (Circuit docket 12-1269) – On December 11, 2012, the Seventh Circuit ruled that the Second Amendment protected a right to keep and bear arms in public for self-defense. This was an expansion of the Supreme Court's decisions in Heller and McDonald, each of which referred only to such a right in the home. Based on this ruling, the court declared Illinois's ban on the concealed carrying of firearms to be unconstitutional. The court stayed this ruling for 180 days, so Illinois could enact replacement legislation. On February 22, 2013, a petition for rehearing en banc was denied by a vote of 5–4. On July 9, 2013, the Illinois General Assembly, overriding Governor Quinn's veto, passed a law permitting the concealed carrying of firearms.

==== Ninth Circuit ====
- Nordyke v. King, 2012 WL 1959239 (9th Cir. 2012) – On July 29, 2009, the Ninth Circuit vacated an April 20 panel decision and reheard the case en banc on September 24, 2009. The April 20 decision had held that the Second Amendment applies to state and local governments, while upholding an Alameda County, California ordinance that makes it a crime to bring a gun or ammunition on to, or possess either while on, county property. The en banc panel remanded the case to the three-judge panel. On May 2, 2011, that panel ruled that intermediate scrutiny was the correct standard by which to judge the ordinance's constitutionality and remanded the case to the United States District Court for the Northern District of California. On November 28, 2011, the Ninth Circuit vacated the panel's May 2 decision and agreed to rehear the case en banc. On April 4, 2012, the panel sent the case to mediation. The panel dismissed the case on June 1, 2012, but only after Alameda County officials changed their interpretation of the challenged ordinance. Under the new interpretation, gun shows may take place on county property under the ordinance's exception for "events", subject to restrictions regarding the display and handling of firearms.
- Teixeira v. County of Alameda, (Circuit docket 13-17132) – On May 16, 2016, the Ninth Circuit ruled that the right to keep and bear arms included being able to buy and sell firearms. The court ruled that a county law prohibiting a gun store being within 500 feet of a "[r]esidentially zoned district; elementary, middle or high school; pre-school or day care center; other firearms sales business; or liquor stores or establishments in which liquor is served" violated the Second Amendment.
- Peruta v. San Diego No. 10-56971 (9th Cir. 2016), (Circuit docket 13-17132) – On June 9, 2016, pertaining to the legality of San Diego County's restrictive policy regarding requiring documentation of "good cause" before issuing a concealed carry permit, the Ninth Circuit upheld the policy, finding that "there is no Second Amendment right for members of the general public to carry concealed firearms in public."
- Young v. State of Hawaii No. 12-17808 (9th Cir. 2021) – An en banc ruling of the Ninth Circuit on March 26, 2021, upheld the validity of Hawaii's law that barred open carry of guns outside of one's home without a license. The Ninth Circuit ruled that there was no right to carry weapons in public spaces, and states have a compelling interest for public safety to restrict public possession of guns.

== See also ==
- 2nd Amendment Day
- Second Amendment sanctuary
- Gun ownership#United States gun ownership
- Gun culture in the United States
- Gun law in the United States#Second Amendment
- Gun politics in the United States
- List of amendments to the United States Constitution
- Right to keep and bear arms (worldwide)
- Second Amendment Caucus – a Congressional caucus dedicated to supporting the right to bear arms
- Uniform Firearms Act – a set of statutes in Pennsylvania that define and amplify the right to bear arms in that state's Constitution
