= 3D2A =

3D printed gun rights advocacy movement

The Come and Take It (Folder) flag, by Defense Distributed.

3D2A is a term for the 3D-printed gun rights movement. The "3D" is taken from 3D printing, which can be used to make firearms and other weapons, and the "2A" is an acronym for the Second Amendment to the United States Constitution. The movement does not adhere to one monolithic ideology, but it maintains a commitment to free speech and open-source software design principles.

== History ==
3D2A's "History and Value."

The 3D2A movement was born from the efforts of American and European designers attempting to share the files and build guides for 3D-printed firearms online in the face of legal restrictions. Since Defense Distributed and the days of the Liberator pistol, world governments have attempted to block, censor, and surveil the distribution of 3D gun files on the Internet.

As of December 2025, 3D2A has been called "a massive movement" and is seen as growing rapidly in many online communities primarily (but not exclusively) based in the United States. The prevalence and availability of 3D-printed guns is seen to be rising rapidly, with 19,000 so called "ghost guns" recovered by law enforcement in 2021. 3D-printed receivers and complete guns such as the FGC-9 can now be made entirely with 3D-printing and home building techniques, which places authorities in a position where strict gun control or law enforcement becomes in many cases impossible.

In 2026, states like California began cracking down on sharing 3D2A files online without restriction, targeting the movement's popular file hubs. States like New York have legally required that 3D printers sold in their state scan for 3D2A files in advance of printing them.

In August 2026, federal district judge Reed O'Connor ruled in Defense Distributed v. Blanche that the private making of firearms was activity protected by the Second Amendment of the U.S. Constitution.

== Beliefs ==
Courtney Nilan, Deputy Chief of the NYPD Intelligence Division, leads the NYPD's "ghost guns unit" -- the most active investigation of 3D2A adherents in the United States. She has stated:

“If they put out their manifesto/constitution, they call 3D2A the ‘New Second Amendment.’ They are heavy into their ideology, big, anti-government, anti-establishment. They believe everybody, everybody should be able to have a gun, should be able to make a gun label, and they’re calling it the ‘New Second Amendment.’”

== Criticism ==
Critics have labeled the movement and its activities as a kind of "memed accelerationism," and have labeled the movement as part of a greater "accelerationist" tendency coming from entities without a clear political agenda or motive.

== Books and Films Featuring 3D2A ==
- Wilson, Cody (2026). GunCAD: 3D2A History and Value. DEFCAD. ISBN 979-8988553823.

== See also ==
- Gun control in the United States on 3D printed firearms
- Defense Distributed
- Electronic Frontier Foundation
- Cody Wilson
- Accelerationism
