= 3D-printed firearm =

Firearm created using 3D printing

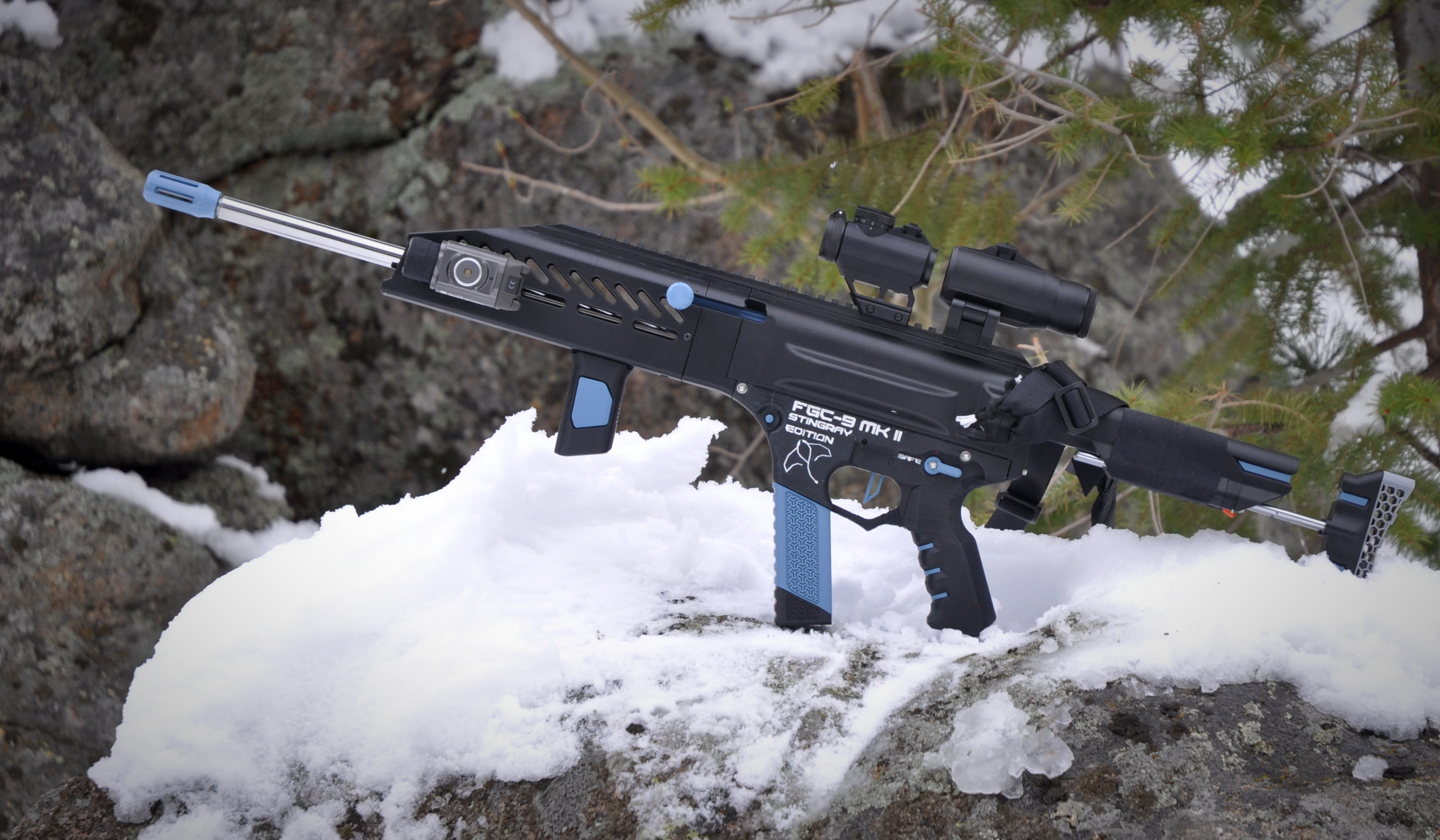
A side photo of the FGC-9 MKII Stingray.

A 3D-printed firearm is a firearm that is partially or primarily produced with a 3D printer. While plastic printed firearms are associated with improvised firearms, or the politics of gun control, digitally-produced metal firearms are more associated with commercial manufacturing or experiments in traditional firearms design.

Although it is possible to create fully printed plastic firearms and silencers, these tend to have short operating lives. 3D-printed gun culture is built around the printing of open-source firearm frames and receivers, the use of standard, metal commercial components (such as an action and barrel), and other parts that can be made or purchased in a parts kit. (Note: In the United States, the firearm's identity is defined by its receiver (frame). Just printing a frame creates a "firearm" in the legal definition.)

While 3D-printed parts are made in the development and production of conventional firearms, they are more commonly associated with homemade firearms and the 3D2A movement in American gun politics. 3D-printed parts complicate the debates regarding high-capacity magazine and assault weapon bans, as well as federal regulations, such as the ATF's pistol brace rule.

== History ==
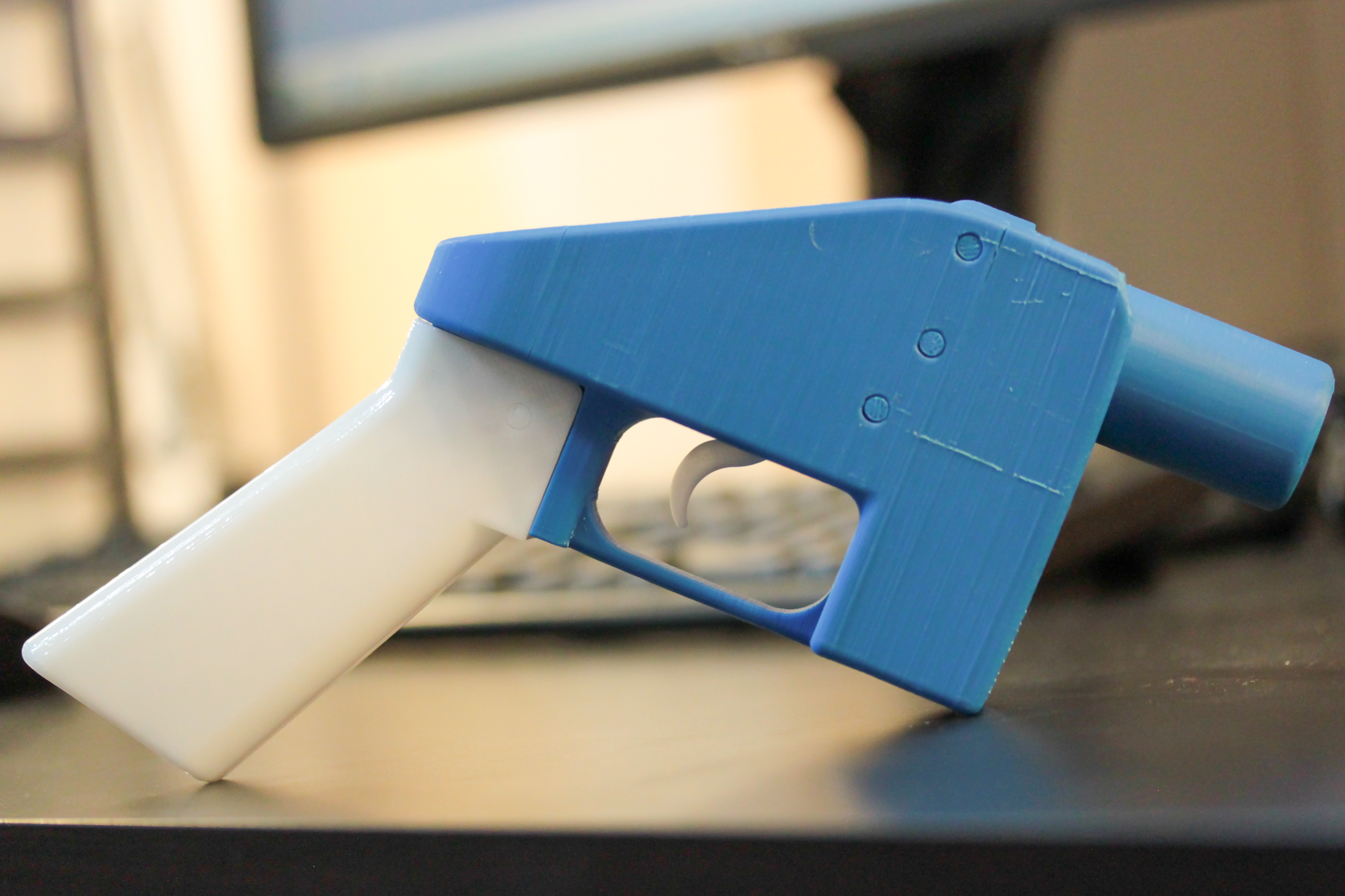
Liberator single-shot pistol, the first 3D-printable firearm widely available online.

In May 2013, the American company Defense Distributed published plans for the first complete firearm that could be downloaded and reproduced by anyone with a desktop 3D printer. Defense Distributed also designed the first generation of 3D-printed AR-15–type rifle receivers and magazines. With these early online publications, the United States Department of State demanded removal of the files from the company's website DEFCAD, deeming the activity a violation of the Arms Export Control Act. In 2015, Defense Distributed sued the State Department on free speech grounds, and in 2018, the Department of Justice settled, acknowledging the American right to publish instructions for the production of 3D-printed firearms online.

Legal action against Defense Distributed inspired the creation of additional decentralized 3D-printed firearm communities, including Deterrence Dispensed in 2019, and the modern 3D2A movement. Members of these communities are generally anonymous and are often based in non-U.S. jurisdictions.

In October 2020, Jacob Duygu, a Kurdish German gun designer known by the pseudonym "JStark1809," released the FGC-9, which became the world's most popular printed gun. A second model was later made in April 2021, and both could be made in a matter of weeks with less than $500 in tools and materials.

Rebels in the 2021 phase of the Myanmar Civil War used 3D-printed firearms against the military junta, but the frequency lessened as funds and conventional weaponry became more available.

In December 2024, UnitedHealthcare CEO Brian Thompson was allegedly killed with a printed pistol and printed silencer. The gun appeared to be a "Chairmanwon V1", a remix of a 2021 Glock-pattern design called "FMDA 19.2".

In January 2026, the California Attorney General sued a group called "The Gatalog" for illegally distributing hundreds of 3D gun files to individuals across the state. Attorney General Rob Bonta and San Francisco City Attorney David Chiu announced the lawsuit as a "landmark" event that would hold the defendants accountable for spreading machine gun conversion devices, "Glock switches," large-capacity magazines, and other illegal products to individuals without a license to manufacture firearms in California, which had recently criminalized the distribution of 3D2A files.

In August 2026, federal district judge Reed O'Connor ruled in Defense Distributed v. Blanche that the private making of firearms was activity protected by the Second Amendment of the U.S. Constitution.

The U.S. Army has also experimented with this technology, as seen in the case of the 3D-printed "RAMBO" (Rapid Additively Manufactured Ballistics Ordnance) grenade launcher and its 3D-printed ammunitions.

During recent conflicts – such as those in Myanmar and Ukraine – 3D-printing technology has made it possible to manufacture not only firearms and firearm parts, but also improvised explosive devices (IEDs) and related components, such as bombs, grenades, drone-dropped mines, shells and casings, stabilizing fins and fuzes.

== Effect on gun control ==
After Defense Distributed released the first generation of files, world media questioned the effects that 3D printing and widespread, consumer-level CNC machining would have on international gun control laws.

The U.S. Department of Homeland Security and the Joint Regional Intelligence Center released a memo stating "Significant advances in three-dimensional (3D) printing capabilities, availability of free digital 3D printer files for firearms components, and difficulty regulating file sharing may present public safety risks from unqualified gun seekers who obtain or manufacture 3D-printed guns," and that "proposed legislation to ban 3D printing of weapons may deter, but cannot completely prevent their production. Even if the practice is prohibited by new legislation, online distribution of these digital files will be as difficult to control as any other illegally traded music, movie or, software files."

Internationally, where gun control laws are generally stricter than in the United States, some commentators have predicted the impact of 3D-printed firearms may be more strongly felt, since commercial firearms are not as easily obtained. European officials have noted that producing a 3D-printed gun would be illegal under their gun control laws, and that criminals have access to other sources of weapons, but noted that as the technology improved, the risks of an effect would increase. Over the past decade, authorities and law enforcement agencies in many countries, including Brazil, Germany, Spain, and the United Kingdom, reported a heavy surge in downloads of digital blueprints for 3D-printed firearms.

Attempts to restrict the distribution of digital blueprints for 3D-printed firearms over the Internet have been likened to the futility of preventing the widespread distribution of DeCSS, which enabled DVD ripping. After the U.S. government had Defense Distributed take down the digital blueprints, they were still widely available via The Pirate Bay and other file-sharing sites. Some US legislators have proposed regulations on 3D printers to prevent their use for printing guns. 3D printing advocates have suggested that such regulations would be futile, could cripple the 3D printing industry, and could infringe on free speech rights.

3D printing pioneer Professor Hod Lipson suggested that gunpowder could be controlled instead.

Chelsea Parsons at the Center for American Progress advocated technical countermeasures designed to prevent owners from printing guns. The EURion constellation is used in a similar way to prevent color photocopiers from producing counterfeit currency, and the Counterfeit Deterrence System is used in image editing software.

In 2022, 3D-printing led to the proliferation of the Glock switch, which converts a Glock pistol into a select-fire machine pistol. The ATF commented in February 2023 that converted Glocks were found "on a weekly basis".

== Legal status ==
=== Australia ===
In Australia, New South Wales' state law criminalizes the possession of digital blueprints and files to 3D print firearms under Section 51F of the Firearms Act 1996. In one case in 2015, a loaded, 3D-printed firearm was found during a police raid on a meth lab.

In another case in February 2017, Sicen Sun was arrested on charges related to 3D printable guns. During the trial in December 2017, he pleaded guilty to charges including possessing a digital blueprint for the manufacture of firearms, manufacturing a pistol without a licence permit, and possessing an unauthorised pistol. In a sentence hearing on August 6, 2018, he told the court he initially wanted to replicate a gun from the videogame Halo, and when he started searching blueprints online, he downloaded plans for other guns that looked "cool". Sun had previously posted an advertisement on the internet to sell one of his imitation weapons for "$1 million negotiable" on a Facebook buy, swap, and sell group, which set off the investigation.

=== Canada ===
The Canadian Criminal Code makes it a crime for a person to manufacture (or offer to manufacture) any firearm or ammunition knowing that the person is not authorized to do so under Canadian laws or regulations. Authorizations to manufacture can be obtained, for example, as a capability attached to a firearms business license. Moreover, the Canadian government has stated that "regardless of manufacturing method, a business licence is required to produce a firearm." At least two separate cases during 2020 have led to charges for 3D printing of firearms.

In 2023, a further ban was placed on computer data pertaining to certain firearms and prohibited devices, making it illegal to 1) possess or access such data for the purpose of manufacturing or trafficking, and/or 2) distribute such data knowing that the computer data are intended to be used for the purpose of manufacturing or trafficking. This ban was targeted at 3D-printed firearms, but legally includes any other manufacturing method, and includes prohibited devices (e.g., suppressors, high-capacity magazines, short barrels, and objects that resemble real firearms).

=== Germany ===
The Halle synagogue shooting gained particular notoriety for the use of improvised firearms by the perpetrator. 3D-printed magazines and a hybrid gun with a 3D-printed lower receiver were carried by the shooter, though left unused. The shooter was later found to have 3D printed several additional guns. This sparked questions about the legal status of such firearms, though the consensus in most parties represented in the Bundestag was that no additional legislation would be necessary, as the current German gun law explicitly prohibits the unlicensed manufacture of firearms regardless of method.

=== Ireland ===
On 12 May 2026, Craig McKeever was sentenced to four years and six months, with the final six months suspended, after pleading guilty to possession of a 3D printed .22 calibre pistol and three rounds of ammunition. Detective Garda Niall White told the court that 3d printed firearms were becoming "more prevalent".

=== Italy ===
3D-printed firearms in Italy are subjected to the same laws as typical gunsmithed firearms, only requiring a license, as long as the firearms stay within legal limits. In November 2021, it was reported that in Naples and other areas of Campania, the local Camorra has begun using 3D-printed firearms and ammunition due to ease of access and for selling on to other gangs. This was found out via the discovery of videos and images on a seized iPhone of said firearms.

=== Japan ===
In Japan, in May 2014, Yoshitomo Imura was the first person to be arrested for possessing printed guns. Imura had five guns, two of which were capable of being fired, but had no ammunition. Imura had previously posted blueprints and video of his Zig Zag revolvers to the Internet, which set off the investigation.

=== Singapore ===
The Singaporean government passed a law in January 2021 that made it an offence for anyone in Singapore to possess a digital blueprint of a gun or gun part without a license under the Guns, Explosives and Weapons Control Act.

=== United Kingdom ===
In the United Kingdom, the Firearms Act 1968 bans the manufacturing of guns and gun parts without government approval. Hence, 3D printed weapons are de facto banned because the law bans all manufacturing, regardless of method. However, the Home Office updated its Guide on Firearms Licensing Law to specifically mention the ban on 3D printed weapons.

In June 2019, Tendai Muswere, aged 26, became the first person in the United Kingdom charged with making a gun with a 3D printer. The firearm in question, which he claims was merely a prop for a dystopian film he was working on, was found during a raid following claims he was growing and selling cannabis. Originally in October 2017, he claimed he was only printing gun-like models, however in February 2018, following another raid, it was found his intentions were to make a working firearm based on his browser history and some working gun components found in his house along with homemade gunpowder.

Border Security, Asylum and Immigration Act 2025 explicitly criminalised the possession, creation, and distribution of 3D-printed firearm templates.

=== United States ===
Under the Undetectable Firearms Act, any firearm that cannot be detected by a metal detector is illegal to manufacture, so legal designs for firearms such as the Liberator require a metal plate to be inserted into the printed body. The Act was renewed for five years in 1998, ten years in 2003 and 2013, and most recently until March 8, 2031 in 2024. The subject of 3D-printed guns gained such attention that in 2014, Netflix included it in its documentary "Print the Legend", a film about the significance of 3D printing technology.

In 2013, the company Defense Distributed, founded by Cody Wilson, began posting digital blueprints for 3D-printed firearms online. In 2015, the Obama Administration decided to amend the International Traffic in Arms Regulations to include 3D-printed firearms. With these changes in place, the United States Department of State Directorate of Defense Trade Controls ordered Defense Distributed to remove digital blueprints since it was not licensed to export them. Various federal courts ruled in Defense Distributed v. United States Department of State, which claimed the regulations violated the First and Second Amendments to the United States Constitution. The State Department settled the case by giving an export license to Defense Distributed, prevailing despite lawsuits from several states to prevent it.

On August 1, 2018, the US District Court blocked the re-publication of digital blueprints for 3D-printed firearms online due to the potential risk to the public. In January 2020, the Trump Administration published a rule change to remove 3D-printed gun blueprints from the munitions list and transfer administrative authority over them to the Commerce Department. A U.S. District judge blocked the rule change on procedural grounds in March 2020, but the Ninth Circuit Court of Appeals overturned that ruling in April 2021. As a result, online posting of plans for 3D-printed firearms now requires a license under the Export Administration Regulations issued by the Bureau of Industry and Security.

Laws related to the manufacture, sale, and possession of firearms generally apply to 3D-printed firearms. Some state and local laws apply more specifically to 3D-printed guns:

- California requires (under a 2018 law) homemade guns to have a small piece of stainless steel embedded, with a serial number issued by the California Justice Department, and regulations with regard to safety classes and background checks apply.
- Massachusetts bans "concealed" weapons, defined as ones that cannot be found with metal detectors or that resemble other objects. Attorney General Maura Healey states that this rule "prohibits" 3D-printed guns, which is dubious considering most contain metal.
- New Jersey restricts the manufacturing of 3D-printed guns and distributions for blueprints to licensed firearm manufacturers. In 2018, New Jersey Attorney General Gurbir Grewal sent a cease and desist letter to Defense Distributed ordering it not to distribute its plans to people in New Jersey. The company sued on First Amendment grounds; as of March 2021, the case Defense Distributed v. Gurbir Grewal had been remanded to a district court after higher courts settled jurisdictional issues.
- Philadelphia banned the manufacture and possession of 3D-printed firearms in November 2013.

Currently, it is not federally prohibited by law to manufacture firearms for personal use in the United States, as long as the firearm is not produced with the intent to be sold or transferred, and meets a few basic requirements. A license is required to manufacture firearms for sale or distribution. The law prohibits a person from assembling a non-sporting semiautomatic rifle or shotgun from 10 or more imported parts, as well as firearms that cannot be detected by metal detectors or X-ray machines. In addition, manufacturing an NFA firearm requires a tax payment and advance approval from the ATF.

== See also ==
- 3D printing
- Code as speech
- FGC-9
- Forensic examination of 3D-printed firearms
- Gun control
- Gun politics in the United States
- Improvised explosive device
- Improvised firearm
- List of 3D printed weapons and parts
- Urutau (3D Printable Firearm)
