= The WASP =

3D printed firearm design

WASP
- Type: Single-shot pistol
- Place of origin: United States

Production history
- Designer: Defense Distributed
- Designed: October 2026
- Produced: 2026–present

Specifications
- Cartridge: .22 LR
- Action: Single-shot

The WASP is a 3D-printable single-shot handgun, the first such printable firearm design claimed to have been produced entirely with an AI and made available online. Defense Distributed, its creator, claimed to have made it with an AI agent called "GatGPT."

== See also ==
- Code as speech
- List of notable 3D printed weapons and parts
- 3D2A
