= Bondi v. VanDerStok =

2025 United States Supreme Court case

- Supreme Court of the United States

Argued October 8, 2024 Decided March 26, 2025
- Full case name: Pamela Bondi, Attorney General, et al., Petitioners v. Jennifer VanDerStok, et al.
- Docket no.: 23-852
- Citations: 604 U.S. 458 (more)
- Argument: Oral argument
- Decision: Opinion

Case history
- Prior: Preliminary injunction granted. VanDerStok v. Garland, 625 F. Supp. 3d 570 (N.D. Tex. 2022).; Affirmed in part and vacated and remanded in part. VanDerStok v. Garland, 86 F.4th 179 (5th Cir. 2023).
- Subsequent: Defense Distributed v. Blanche (N.D. Tex. 2026)

Questions presented
- 1. Whether "a weapon parts kit that is designed to or may readily be completed, assembled, restored, or otherwise converted to expel a projectile by the action of an explosive", 27 C.F.R. 478.11, is a "firearm" regulated by the Act.; 2. Whether "a partially complete, disassembled, or nonfunctional frame or receiver" that is "designed to or may readily be completed, assembled, restored, or otherwise converted to function as a frame or receiver", 27 C.F.R. 478.12(c), is a "frame or receiver" regulated by the Act.

Holding
- The ATF’s rule is not facially inconsistent with the GCA.

Court membership
- Chief Justice John Roberts Associate Justices Clarence Thomas · Samuel Alito; Sonia Sotomayor · Elena Kagan; Neil Gorsuch · Brett Kavanaugh; Amy Coney Barrett · Ketanji Brown Jackson

Case opinions
- Majority: Gorsuch, joined by Roberts, Sotomayor, Kagan, Kavanaugh, Barrett, and Jackson
- Concurrence: Sotomayor
- Concurrence: Kavanaugh
- Concurrence: Jackson
- Dissent: Thomas
- Dissent: Alito

Laws applied
- 18 U.S.C. § 921; 27 C.F.R. §§ 478.11, 478.12(c)

Bondi v. VanDerStok, 604 U.S. 458 (2025), is a United States Supreme Court case regarding the Bureau of Alcohol Tobacco and Firearms (ATF) 2021 regulations revising its interpretation of the Gun Control Act of 1968's use of the terms "firearm", "firearm frame", and "receiver" to cover "ghost gun" kits of weapon parts. In a 7–2 decision, the Supreme Court held that because facial challenges against regulations require all applications to be inconsistent with the underlying statute, the ATF's regulations could not be struck down under this standard.

== History ==
In August 2022, Jennifer VanDerStok, Tactical Machining, the Mountain States Legal Foundation, and the Firearms Policy Coalition sued in the U.S. District Court for the Northern District of Texas to block enforcement of the Gun Control Act on homemade firearms (also known as "ghost guns") made from a weapon parts kit. Between September 2022 and January 2023, Blackhawk Manufacturing Group, Defense Distributed, the Second Amendment Foundation, JSD Supply, and Polymer80 filed motions to intervene based on their unique interests in the case.

The plaintiffs argued that the ATF's 2021 regulations applying provisions of the Gun Control Act violated the Second Amendment and Administrative Procedure Act. Over the course of six months, Judge Reed O'Connor granted partial injunctive relief to many of the plaintiffs before ultimately deciding cross-motions for summary judgment against the ATF, striking down the agency's final rule.

On August 8, 2023, the Supreme Court of the United States issued a stay of Judge O'Connor's nationwide injunction while the case was on appeal before the Fifth Circuit Court of Appeals. On October 2, 2023, the Fifth Circuit upheld that order, leading the Supreme Court to reissue its stay on a nationwide injunction pending its appeal. On April 22, 2024, the Supreme Court of the United States granted certiorari to hear the case on appeal.

== Supreme Court ==
=== Oral arguments ===
During oral arguments held on October 8, 2024, Solicitor General Elizabeth Prelogar highlighted that the Gun Control Act's serial numbering, record-keeping, and background check requirements must be uniformly applied to all firearm sales to support investigations of gun crimes and deny firearm possession to minors, felons, and domestic abusers. In her view, the ATF's regulation interpreting the Gun Control Act to cover easy-to-assemble weapon parts kits as firearms was consistent with prior regulations that similarly analyzed the assembly time, requisite skill, and availability of additional components in classifying frames and receivers. Associate Justice Amy Coney Barrett agreed with Prelogar's position, noting that while ghost guns are a recent phenomenon, the Gun Control Act was enacted with the intent to regulate grenades and machine guns that were typically purchased as their component parts.

Citing the Supreme Court's 1991 decision in INS v. National Center for Immigrants' Rights, Justice Sonia Sotomayor highlighted that this case's facial pre-enforcement challenge would require the plaintiffs to show that the ATF's regulation deviated from the Gun Control Act's statutory text, rather than simply identifying a product that would be improperly covered under the new regulation. Sotomayor further noted that since the Gun Control Act specifically stakes its authority over starting pistols designed to fire blank cartridges, weapon parts kits similarly qualify for regulation because of their capacity to be readily converted into a working firearm.

Prelogar cited the Supreme Court's 2014 decision in Abramski v. United States, which held that the Gun Control Act's statutorily ambiguous provisions should be interpreted in ways that do not circumvent its purpose of regulating access to firearms. In his opposing argument, Peter A. Patterson rebutted that Congress' decision to not regulate the secondary market of resold firearms, despite its larger role in criminals acquiring weapons, makes that case's anti-circumvention principle an insufficient defense for this regulation on weapon parts kits.

Patterson advocated for returning to the ATF's prior "critical machining test", which evaluates whether the purchaser must use tools to further modify the frame or receiver before it becomes usable in a firearm. However, most of the justices explicitly rejected this proposal on the basis that agencies are not required to adopt de minimis regulatory interpretations of statutes. In response to questioning on the appeal of weapon parts sold one drilling hole away from assembling a firearm, Patterson claimed that requiring the purchaser to use tools catered to a hobbyist market, which Prelogar rejected because the marketing for these products has focused on their untraceability.

Justice Ketanji Brown Jackson noted that in applying the Supreme Court's 2024 decision in Loper Bright Enterprises v. Raimondo, which ended Chevron deference to agency interpretations of statutes, courts should only judge whether the agency has acted within its statutory authority, not whether the regulation's scope matches the judge's statutory interpretation.

=== Decision ===
In a majority opinion written by Associate Justice Neil Gorsuch, the Supreme Court ruled that the ATF's 2021 regulations were not facially inconsistent with the Gun Control Act, remanding the case to the Fifth Circuit for further proceedings. Under a facial challenge, the plaintiffs needed to prove that the regulations would be inconsistent with the statute in all applications, whereas Gorsuch considered Polymer80's kits comparable to the starting pistols explicitly covered as weapons under the statute. Gorsuch similarly deemed the Gun Control Act's use of "frame" and "receiver" as referring to some unfinished products, given that the ATF had regulated some unfinished frames and receivers in prior decades.

==== Concurrences ====
Associate Justices Sonia Sotomayor, Brett Kavanaugh, and Ketanji Brown Jackson filed concurring opinions. Kavanaugh advised the federal government to not charge those unaware that a weapon parts kit must be sold with a background check, while Sotomayor's concurrence considered such mens rea concerns negligible because firearm manufacturers regularly submit their products to the ATF for clarification on whether they are covered entities.

==== Dissents ====
Associate Justices Clarence Thomas and Samuel Alito filed dissenting opinions. Thomas argued that whereas the Federal Firearms Act of 1938 explicitly covered weapon parts, the wording of the Gun Control Act of 1968 did not. Furthermore, Thomas opined that whereas United States v. Salerno required facial challenges against a statute to prove that all applications would be unconstitutional, facial challenges against a regulatory definition should only involve comparison against the statutory text. Alito reiterated the latter point, claiming that facial challenges should be easier to mount against agencies than legislatures because only the latter are mentioned in the Constitution.

=== Subsequent developments ===
On remand the case continued as Defense Distributed v. Blanche (2026).
