= Forensic examination of 3D-printed firearms =

Forensic examination of 3D-printed firearms covers the methods investigators use to examine and trace guns made on 3D printers. Regular guns are bought from licensed dealers and have a serial number, so they can be traced from the manufacturer to the store to the buyer. Homemade firearms, sometimes called "ghost guns", do not have the same serial number requirements, so there is usually nothing to trace. Matching marks on bullets does not solve this problem either. Many printed guns have plastic barrels, and while these can leave some marks on a bullet, the marks are not reliable enough for matching.

== Background ==
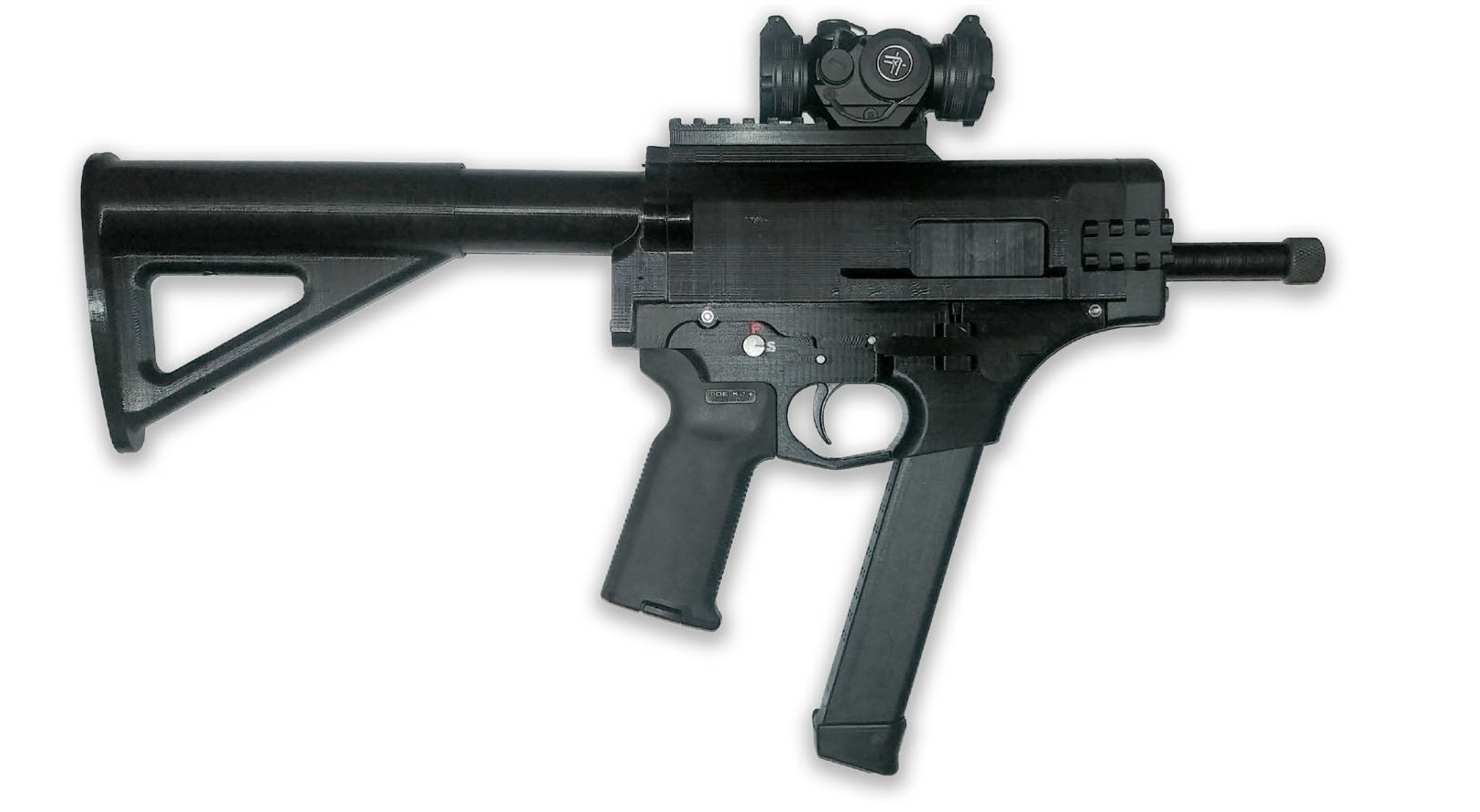
An FGC-9, a partly 3D-printed design. FGC-9s were among the guns used in a 2026 study on recovering DNA from printed guns.

3D-printed guns have been showing up in crimes more often. One study found 225 incidents between 2013 and July 2024, with most of the growth happening after 2020. In the United States, around 2.9 million adults own a homemade gun. About 16% of those guns were 3D printed, and about half had no serial number at all.

Printed guns are usually split into two types. Fully printed guns, such as the Liberator, are made almost entirely of plastic, with only a few small non-printed parts like a firing pin, nails, screws, or rubber bands. Hybrid guns combine printed parts with metal parts such as springs, screws, or metal tubing, which makes them stronger and more reliable.

Normal tracing does not work well on these guns. Even when a homemade gun does have a number, it may be fake or a copy of another gun's number, which can send police after false leads. Since 2020, the ATF has given police guidance on how to recognize homemade guns and submit them for tracing. Because most of these guns cannot be traced back to a buyer, the ATF mainly uses these submissions to keep count of how many homemade guns are being recovered in crimes. Printed guns can also get past security. In a 2021 ATF case, a printed plastic .22 pistol did not set off a TSA-approved metal detector.

== Identifying the plastic ==
The plastic a gun is printed from can sometimes be used to connect it to other evidence. 3D-printing filaments are made of plastics, and the three most common types are polylactic acid (PLA), acrylonitrile butadiene styrene (ABS), and polyethylene terephthalate glycol (PETG). Labs can test the plastic using infrared spectroscopy, which shines infrared light at a sample and records which parts of the light it absorbs. Each type of plastic absorbs light in its own pattern, so PLA, ABS, and PETG can be told apart. Filaments made of the same plastic can sometimes be told apart as well, since small amounts of added ingredients change the pattern slightly, even if the filaments look the same.

Telling apart filaments that look identical could let investigators link a printed gun to filament found at a suspect's home, or link two guns to each other.

This method has limits. A 2026 study tested 67 filaments sold in Australia using infrared analysis and statistics. It identified the type of plastic every time. It could only separate filaments of the same type in some cases, when they contained different additives. It could not identify which company made a filament at all. The study also found that raw filament has an outer coating that is chemically different from its core and from printed parts, which makes matching filament to a gun harder.

== Linking a part to a printer ==
Marks left by the printer itself can sometimes connect a printed part to the machine that made it. Most modern 3D printers use a removable build plate, which is usually made for a specific printer or brand. Many build plates are textured so parts stick better and do not warp. When a part is printed, the first layer takes on the opposite shape of the plate it sits on.

Every plate of the same type has the same texture, so the texture alone only narrows down the source. However, plates also pick up random fine scratches over time, and these are different on every plate. A 2021 study found that these scratches copy onto the bottom of printed parts in fine detail, about as clearly as the casting materials examiners normally use to copy toolmarks. The researchers compared the bottoms of parts using a stereo microscope and a comparison microscope, the same tools used in normal toolmark examination. This way, they were able to match two parts to each other and match a part to a suspected printer.

== Marks after firing ==
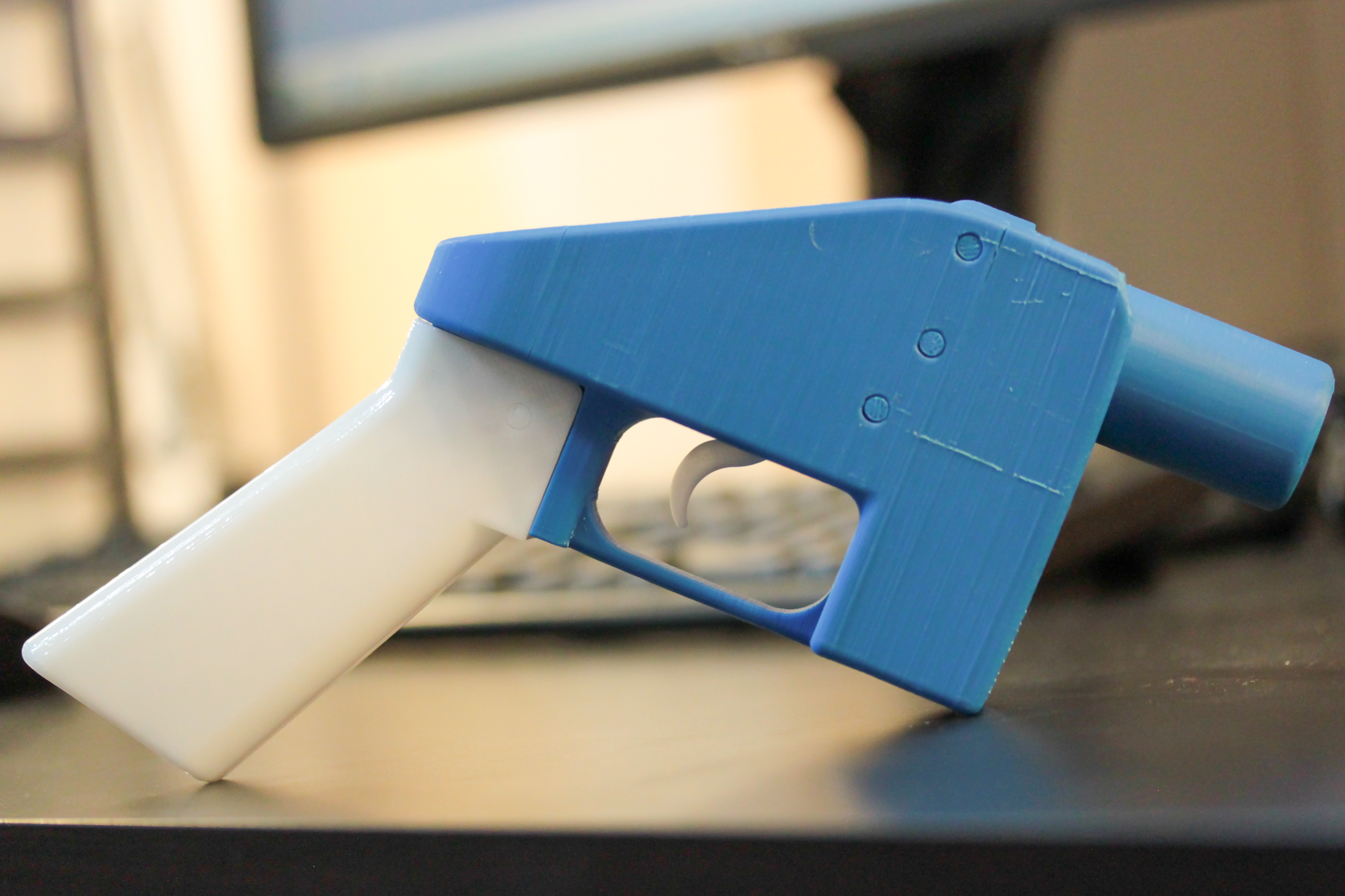
The Liberator, an almost fully 3D-printed single-shot pistol

Firing a printed gun leaves different traces than firing a regular gun. If a printed gun is not found at a shooting, small amounts of plastic may still be found on the bullet or casing, or as broken pieces nearby.

A 2023 study printed six different fully printed gun designs out of PLA on the same printer and test-fired each one. All six were damaged badly enough that they could not fire again unless the broken pieces were replaced. The broken pieces were thrown into the area around the gun, and they could be fitted back together to show which gun they came from. Melted plastic was found on the ammunition, and the cartridge cases had tears or swelling.

A 2024 study printed a Liberator from files downloaded online, using PLA and ABS plastic, and fired it remotely into stacks of newspaper. The gun worked reliably for one shot. The bullet and casing did not have marks that could be matched to the gun, but both had plastic deposits on them.

== Other evidence ==
Investigators can also look for DNA and use scans to study a gun without damaging it. A 2026 study tested how DNA moves onto printed pistols and FGC-9 carbines in handling situations based on real cases. DNA from the person who assembled a gun could be found on its internal parts, with much more found on internal grip pieces than on internal trigger parts. Test-firing a gun up to 25 times did not move the shooter's DNA onto these internal parts. Since these parts are inside the gun, it has to be taken apart to swab them, which can affect test-firing it later.

Some labs use micro-CT scans, a detailed type of X-ray scan, to look inside seized guns before taking them apart. In one UK case involving two hybrid guns, the scans helped experts see how the guns worked and which parts were printed and which were made another way. The scans also kept a digital copy of the guns in case they were damaged during test-firing. Animations and images made from the scans were later shown as evidence in court.

== See also ==
- 3D-printed firearm
- Forensic firearm examination
- National Integrated Ballistic Information Network
