= Polymer80 =

American manufacturer of firearm parts kits

Polymer80, Inc.
- Industry: Firearms
- Founded: May 2013; 13 years ago
- Founders: Loran L. Kelley Jr; David Borges
- Defunct: July 25, 2024
- Fate: Bankruptcy from legal costs
- Headquarters: 134 Lakes Blvd, Dayton, Nevada, United States
- Key people: Loran L. Kelley Jr - President, CEO
- Products: Firearm parts kits
- Owner: Loran Kelley Jr.
- Number of employees: 50 (2022)
- Website: www.polymer80.com

Polymer80, Inc. was an American manufacturer of firearms parts kits that included unfinished receivers (also known as "80 percent" receivers) used for making privately made firearms. The company was founded in 2013 by Loran Kelley Jr. and David Borges and was headquartered in Dayton, Nevada. Polymer80 received press attention for the frequent use of its products in crimes involving so-called "ghost guns", which in specific cases resulted in lawsuits being brought against the company. In July 2024, Polymer80 ceased operations and began liquidating its assets.

== Background ==
Since 1968, U.S. persons involved in the business of the manufacture or distribution of firearms must have a Federal Firearms License and serialize their products. However, the creation and possession of unserialized firearms for non-commercial purposes (i.e. personal use) is generally legal and unregulated under federal law. Typically, only a single, finished part of a weapon is considered to be a "firearm" according to the Gun Control Act, and this is most often the weapon's frame or receiver. While some states have passed controversial laws restricting the creation of privately made firearms, the sale of "unfinished" receivers does not usually require a federal or state background check.

Finishing unfinished receivers may be performed with a common drill press, hand-held rotary tools such as the popular Dremel, or even speciality machine tools like the Ghost Gunner CNC. To assist the home building of private made firearms, unfinished receiver companies would usually sell kits that included drill bits, stencils, or jigs.

In the 2010s, companies like Polymer80 began to sell unfinished frames and receivers that, because they were made from polymer, could be completed with the simplest hand tools. The company's name became synonymous with another term for the trade, known as "80 percent receivers.

== History ==
The company was founded by Loran Kelley Jr. and David Borges in March 2013. The first project undertaken by the company was an injection molded AR-15 rifle lower receiver. The company then moved to AR-10 style rifle lower receivers, and finally pistol receivers. The name of the company refers to the injection molding process combined with the common designation of unfinished receivers as "80% receivers".

The first version of the Glock compatible handgun debuted in 2016, with a follow up that arrived in 2017. The company expanded the options available to consumers in 2019 by offering more Glock compatible frames in more colors and with more options for grip feel.

In 2019, Defense Distributed announced that their Ghost Gunner automated CNC milling machines would be able to mill Glock 19-style Polymer80 compact frames.

The company marketed their kits as "Buy Build Shoot".

Co-founder David Borges retired in 2021. Loran Kelley Sr., who became a partner in the first year of Polymer80, died in January 2022. Loran Kelly Jr. is the current President and CEO of the company.

According to The Daily Beast, Polymer80 received a $371,000 PPP loan in mid-2021 for their reported 31 employees during the COVID-19 pandemic.

As of around July 25, 2024, Polymer80 has ceased business reportedly due to the overwhelming cost of defending itself in court. This is despite the fact that 80% gun frames continue to be proven legal in court.

== Products ==
Polymer80 sold a variety of lower frames and receivers compatible with various models of Glock handguns. They include:

- PF940v2 – full-frame pistol kit, compatible with Glock 17, 34, 17L in 9×19mm; Glock 22, 35, 24 in .40 S&W; and Glock 31 in .357 SIG
- PF940c – compact pistol kit, compatible with Gen3 Glock 19 in 9×19mm and Glock 23 in .40 S&W
- PF940sc – subcompact kit, compatible with Glock 26, chambered in 9×19mm
- PF9SS – subcompact kit, compatible with Glock 43, Gen 4, chambered in 9×19mm
- PF45 – large frame, compatible with Glock G21SF, chambered in .45 ACP

== Controversies ==
The ATF raided the company's headquarters on December 10, 2020. Washington, D.C. Attorney General Karl Racine filed a civil lawsuit against the company for advertising its products within D.C. in June 2019, apparently for the company violating D.C.'s gun laws.

The company sought to intervene in a lawsuit brought forth by the state and parents of the victims in the 2019 Saugus High School shooting against the Department of Justice for their failure to classify receiver blanks like the type Polymer80 sells as firearms under federal law.

In February 2021, the Los Angeles City Attorney Mike Feuer announced that the city along with advocacy group Everytown Law filed a lawsuit against the company for allegedly selling their kits in violation of federal and state law. In June 2021, two Los Angeles County Sheriff's Department deputies injured in a shooting by a felon using a Polymer80 handgun sued the company for "negligently and unlawfully [selling] an untraceable home-assembled gun kit that resulted in the September attack in Compton."

The company opposed a Nevada state law that would criminalize receiver blank sellers and buyers. The law was struck down by Nevada's state courts, which then CEO David Borges called "a significant victory". On May 21, 2021, the Nevada Legislature passed Assembly Bill 286 to prohibit the sale of privately made firearms and the receiver blanks used to make them.

The Los Angeles Police Department reported that nearly 90 percent of privately made firearms recovered by the department in 2021 were from Polymer80.

The city of Baltimore filed a lawsuit against the company for making worse a "public health crisis" of violence associated with the use of privately made firearms. The lawsuit was filed on June 1, 2022, the same day that Maryland's law reclassifying "unfinished receivers" as firearms went into effect.

A 2022 study collected data about firearms recovered by police after being used in a crime. In the twelve American cities studied, Polymer80 was the fifth most commonly found brand, at 3.8%.

On July 5, 2023, the city of Philadelphia filed a lawsuit against Polymer80 and another receiver blank supplier following a mass shooting two days prior that left five people dead.
