= Alan Gura =

American litigator

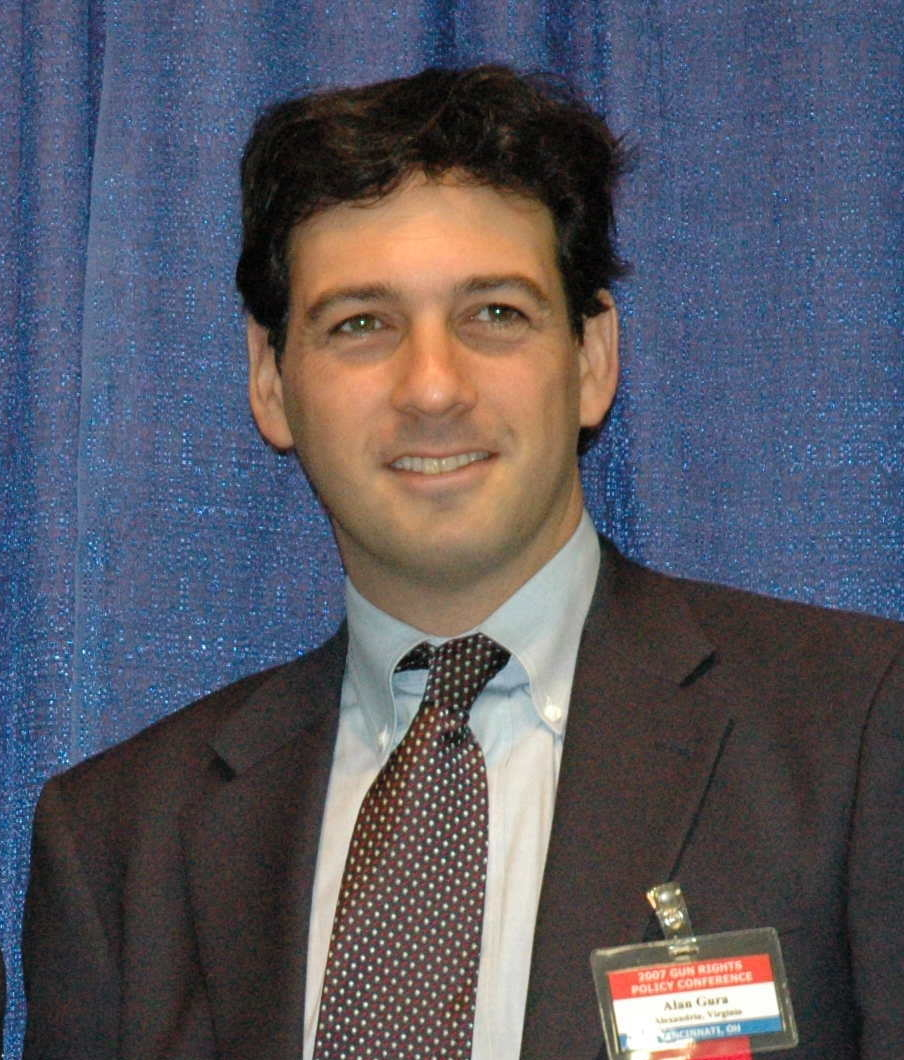
- Education: Cornell University (BA); Georgetown University (JD)

Alan Gura is an American litigator practicing in the areas of civil litigation, appellate litigation, and civil rights law at Gura P.L.L.C. Gura successfully argued two landmark constitutional cases before the United States Supreme Court involving firearms, District of Columbia v. Heller and McDonald v. Chicago.

== Early life and education ==
Gura was born in Israel and settled in Los Angeles, California with his family when he was seven years old. Gura received his BA from Cornell University in 1992 and received his JD from the Georgetown University Law Center in 1995.

== Career ==
Prior to founding Gura & Possessky, PLLC, Gura began his career by serving as a law clerk to the Honorable Terrence W. Boyle, United States District Judge for the Eastern District of North Carolina. Subsequently, as a Deputy Attorney General for the State of California, Gura defended the State of California and its employees in state and federal courts. Thereafter, Gura entered the private practice of law with the Washington, D.C. offices of Sidley & Austin. In February 2000, he left the firm to serve for a year as Counsel to the United States Senate Committee on the Judiciary, Subcommittee on Criminal Justice Oversight.

On July 13, 2009, Legal Times named Gura to the list of “40 Under 40” of Washington D.C.’s rising legal stars. On March 22, 2013, the National Law Journal named Mr. Gura one of "The 100 Most Influential Lawyers in America." On June 6, 2016, he argued for the plaintiff, Defense Distributed, in court against the United States State Department in Defense Distributed v. U.S. Dept. of State. In February 2021, he was named Vice President for Litigation of the Institute for Free Speech.
