= Defense Distributed v. United States Department of State =

2018 US federal court case about 3D printing of firearms

Defense Distributed I
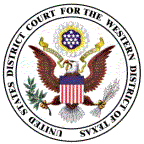
- Court: United States District Court for the Western District of Texas
- Full case name: Defense Distributed et al., v. United States Department of State et al.
- Decided: July 30, 2018
- Citation: 1:15-cv-00372-RP (W.D. Tex.)

Case history
- Subsequent action: dismissed with prejudice

Court membership
- Judge sitting: Robert Pitman

Defense Distributed v. U.S. Dept. of State is a set of court cases brought by Defense Distributed challenging the federal export control of 3D gun files on the Internet.

== History ==
The case was brought in 2015, two years after Cody Wilson and Defense Distributed were banned from sharing the files for the first 3D printed gun, Liberator, on the Internet. In May 2013, Wilson had been a law student at the University of Texas, and had published the Liberator plans on his organization's website when the Obama administration asserted export control of the files under the ITAR and directed Wilson and Defense Distributed to remove them from public availability.

Making First, Second, and Fifth Amendment claims, Defense Distributed was represented by attorney Alan Gura, and had local counsel and other assistance from attorneys Josh Blackman, Matthew Goldstein, and the law firm Fish & Richardson, P.C. In August 2015, the District Court for the Western District of Texas denied Defense Distributed's preliminary injunction request. In September 2016, the United States Court of Appeals for the Fifth Circuit similarly ruled against the motion and subsequently denied a request for rehearing en banc. Defense Distributed appealed this ruling to the Supreme Court in August 2017, who declined to hear the case on January 8, 2018.

On remand to the district court, and on the eve of changes to the federal export regulations, the U.S. State Department offered to settle the case, and on July 27, 2018, Defense Distributed accepted a license to publish its files along with a sum of almost $40,000.

== Reception ==
When later asked to justify the settlement in a press conference, State Department spokesperson Heather Nauert defended the agency's decision, saying:

We were informed that we would have lost this case in court, or would have likely lost this case in court, based on First Amendment grounds … The Department of Justice suggested that the State Department and the U.S. government settle this case, and so that is what was done.

— Heather Nauert, United States Department of State (July 31, 2018)

Over its life, the case drew frequent comparisons to Bernstein v. United States, a successful First Amendment challenge to the ITAR from 1996 where the Ninth Circuit held source code to be protected speech.

== Aftermath ==
The announcement of the settlement, which involved a temporary modification of the ITAR, came as a surprise to many in the gun control movement and was immediately challenged by over 20 state attorneys general in various federal venues. Cases prompted as a reaction to Defense Distributed I include:

- State of Washington v. U.S. Dept. of State
- Gurbir Grewal v. Defense Distributed
- Commonwealth of Pennsylvania v. Defense Distributed
- Defense Distributed v. Gurbir Grewal
- Defense Distributed v. Bruck
