= Zig Zag revolver =

Zig Zag
- Type: Pepper-box Revolver
- Place of origin: Japan

Production history
- Designer: Yoshitomo Imura
- Designed: 2014
- Variants: None

Specifications
- Cartridge: .38 Special
- Caliber: .38
- Action: Single-action
- Feed system: 6-round cylinder
- Sights: None

The Zig Zag revolver is a 3D-printed .38-caliber pepperbox type revolver made public in May 2014. It was created using a $500 plastic 3D-printer, however the name of the printer was not revealed by the creator.

== History ==
It was created by Yoshitomo Imura, who hails from Kawasaki. He was arrested in May 2014 after he had posted a video online of himself firing a 3D-printed Zig Zag revolver. It is the first known 3D-printed gun design from Japan.

After Imura's arrest, a gun called the Imura Revolver was designed and printed by FOSSCAD members and was named in honor of Yoshitomo Imura.

== Design ==
It holds a capacity of 6 bullets and can fire .38 caliber bullets. The grip of the weapon is based on the Mauser C96 and the fact that the weapon fires from the bottom barrel is based on the Mateba Autorevolver.

=== Name ===
The creator decided to call it the Zig Zag, after its ratcheted barrel modeled on the Mauser Zig-Zag.

=== Assembly ===
According to the Wired Magazine "Imura assembles the handgun from plastic 3D printed pieces, a few metal pins, screws and rubber bands, then test fires it with blanks".

=== Operating cycle ===
To fire, the operator loads the rounds into the barrel, and re-attaches the barrel to the rest of the weapon. Once reattached, the operator pulls back the slide where the firing pin is attached, pulls the trigger, which releases the slide into the round, firing the weapon.

== See also ==
- List of notable 3D printed weapons and parts
- Liberator (gun)
