= 2023 Kingsessing shooting =

Mass shooting in Pennsylvania, U.S.

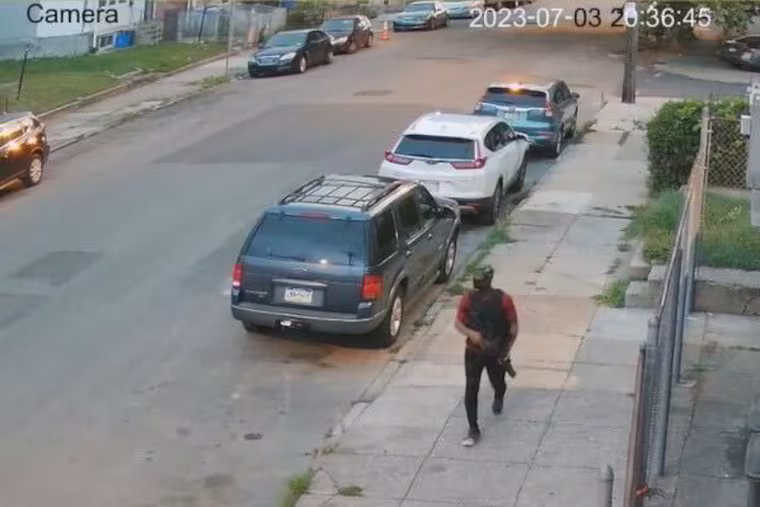
- CCTV still of the shooter
- Location: Kingsessing, Philadelphia, Pennsylvania, U.S.
- Date: July 2–3, 2023
- Attack type: Spree shooting and mass shooting, mass murder
- Weapons: Two “ghost guns”: AR-15–style rifle; 9mm Glock style handgun
- Deaths: 5
- Injuries: 4 (2 by gunfire)
- Perpetrator: Kimbrady Carriker
- Motive: Unknown
- Charges: First-degree murder (5 counts); Attempted first-degree murder; Assault; Reckless endangerment; Criminal possession of a weapon
- Verdict: Pleaded guilty to the lesser charge of third degree murder as well as attempted murder and firearm violations

On July 2–3, 2023, a spree shooting occurred in the Kingsessing neighborhood of Philadelphia, Pennsylvania, United States. Five people were killed and four people were injured. The police apprehended the suspected shooter without incident.

== Shooting ==
The first victim, Joseph Wamah Jr., was killed around 12:30 a.m. EDT on July 2, 2023. The subsequent victims were killed around 8:30 p.m. on July 3, 2023. The shooter, wearing body armor and armed with an AR-15–style rifle and a pistol, opened fire in southwest Kingsessing. He shot randomly at people and occupied cars, killing four more people and wounding four others, two of whom were wounded by gunfire, and two of whom were wounded by shattered glass. Police officers were flagged down and rendered first aid to victims until hearing more gunshots. The accused was then taken into custody.

At some point during the shooting, the brother of one of the victims returned fire in the direction of the shooter. He was temporarily taken into custody, but later released without charges.

== Victims ==
Those killed were Dajuan Brown, 15; Lashyd Merritt, 20; Ralph Moralis, 59, Dymir Stanton, 29; and Joseph Wamah Jr., 31.

== Perpetrator ==
Kimbrady Carriker, age 40, of Philadelphia, was charged with five counts of murder and six other counts. He was denied bail. It was reported that he made violent and disturbing posts on social media. On a now-deleted Facebook profile, Carriker posted about "evil spirits" and stated that he went on "patrols" in his neighborhood to fight crime. According to two law enforcement officers, Carriker told police that he carried out the incident to "clean up the neighborhood". The prosecution revealed that a will dated June 23 was found in Carriker's house, but have not disclosed further details. People who knew Carriker said he was acting "agitated" in the days before the shooting, and was wearing a bulletproof vest around his house. He was convicted of a misdemeanor in 2005, preventing him from possessing firearms. On August 29, 2023, a judge ruled that Carriker was not able to stand trial due to his mental health. On March 19, 2024, the Philadelphia District Attorney's office said that Carriker was deemed competent for trial. On December 17, 2025, Carriker pleaded guilty in the shooting and was sentenced to 37½ to 75 years in prison. The charges in which he pleaded guilty to were third-degree murder, attempted murder and firearm violations.

== Investigation ==
Both the AR-15–style rifle and 9mm handgun in the possession of the perpetrator were privately made firearms, according to the Philadelphia Police Department. The firearms did not have any manufacturer's markings.

The city of Philadelphia filed a lawsuit on July 5 against two firearm component suppliers, Polymer80 and JSD Supply, which are among the largest suppliers of such parts in the city.

== Reactions ==
Philadelphia mayor Jim Kenney expressed outrage over the shooting, saying "This country needs to reexamine its conscience and find out how to get guns out of dangerous people's hands."
