= DEFCAD =

American technology company

DEFCAD, Inc
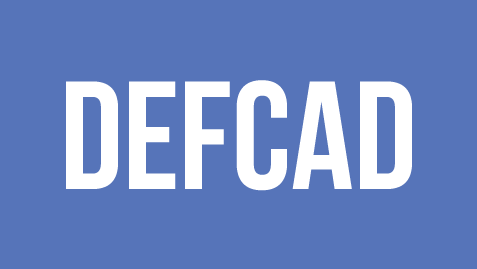
- Type: Private
- Industry: Internet, 3D printing
- Parent: Defense Distributed
- Website: www.defcad.com

DEFCAD, Inc. is an American startup that has created a search engine and web portal for designers and hobbyists to find and develop 3D printable and other CAD models online.

== History ==
=== Founding ===
When Makerbot Industries removed firearms-related 3D Printable files at the public repository Thingiverse in December 2012, open-source software entrepreneurs Cody Wilson and Ashley Tyson launched DEFCAD as a companion site to publicly host the removed files. Public and community submissions to DEFCAD rose quickly, and by March 2013, at the SXSW Interactive festival, DEFCAD announced a repurposed and expanded site that would serve as a 3D search engine and development publication platform.

DEFCAD has been called "The Pirate Bay of 3D Printing" and "the anti-Makerbot".

=== Community ===
DEFCAD began as a repository where users could upload and download CAD models, but quickly became a community with the addition of an IRC channel and public forums. The site has had over 2,500 community users and offered access to over 100,000 models in its history.

=== History ===
In August 2013, DEFCAD released the public alpha of its 3D search engine, which indexes public object repositories and allows users to add their own objects. The site soon closed down due to pressure from the United States State Department, claiming that distributing certain files online violates US Arms Export ITAR regulations.

From 2013 to 2018, DEFCAD remained offline, pending resolution to the legal case Defense Distributed brought against the U.S. State Department, namely that ITAR regulations placed a prior restraint on Defense Distributed's free speech, particularly since the speech in question regarded another constitutionally protected right: firearms. While the legal argument was not resolved in federal court, in a surprise reversal, the State Department agreed to settled its case with DEFCAD in 2018. Therefore, for a brief period in late 2018, DEFCAD was once again publicly available online.

Shortly thereafter, 20 states and Washington DC sued the State Department, in order to prevent DEFCAD from remaining online. At its core, this new suit cited a procedural error: the proper notice had not been given prior to enacting the change in how ITAR applied to small arms. As such, DEFCAD was once again taken offline, pending the State Department providing proper notice via the Federal Register.

In March 2020, the Wall Street Journal reported that DEFCAD had once again became publicly available online. The site implemented a new model to comply with arms export law in which users would be charged $50 and vetted to ensure they were located within the United States and that they were citizens or legal residents.

In August of 2026, Wilson explained that the site uses a process he nicknamed ¨Hochulization¨, altering the digital hash or file signature of 3D models to avoid their detection by security systems with hash-based detection methods. It is a form of signature evasion. The name is a jab against New York Governor Kathy Hochul, who had pushed for laws mandating 3D printing software that restricted ¨ghost gun¨ files.

== See also ==
- Privately made firearm
- 3D-printed firearm
