= Cody Wilson =

American gun rights activist and crypto-anarchist (born 1988)

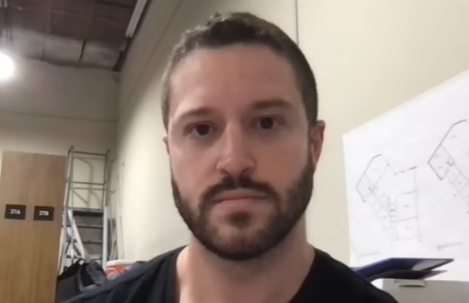
- Wilson in 2023
- Born: January 31, 1988 (age 38); Little Rock, Arkansas, U.S.
- Education: University of Central Arkansas (B.A., 2010)
- Known for: Defense Distributed

Cody Rutledge Wilson (born January 31, 1988) is an American gun rights activist and crypto-anarchist. He started Defense Distributed, a non-profit organization which develops and publishes open source gun designs, so-called "wiki weapons" created by 3D printing and digital manufacture. Defense Distributed gained international notoriety in 2013 when it published plans online for the Liberator, the first widely available functioning 3D-printed pistol.

== Career ==
=== Defense Distributed ===
In 2012, Wilson and associates at Defense Distributed began the Wiki Weapon Project to raise funds for designing and releasing the files for a 3D printable gun. Wilson was the company's first spokesperson, and called himself its "co-founder" and "director."

Learning of Defense Distributed's plans, 3D printer manufacturer Stratasys threatened legal action and demanded the return of a printer it had leased to Wilson. On September 26, 2012, before the printer was assembled for use, Wilson received an email from Stratasys suggesting he was using the printer "for illegal purposes". Stratasys immediately canceled its lease with Wilson and sent a team to confiscate the printer.

Wilson inquired at the ATF in Austin about the legal status of his project, where he was questioned by officers there. Six months later, he was given a Federal Firearms License (FFL) to manufacture and deal weapons.

In May 2013, Wilson successfully test-fired a pistol called "the Liberator", made using a Stratasys Dimension series 3D printer purchased on eBay. After test firing, he released the blueprints of the gun's design online through a Defense Distributed website. The State Department Office of Defense Trade Controls Compliance demanded he take the files down, threatening prosecution for violations of the International Traffic in Arms Regulations (ITAR). In October 2014, Defense Distributed began selling a miniature CNC (computer numerical control) mill named Ghost Gunner to finish "80 percent" receivers, like those used to build the AR-15 semi-automatic rifle.

In November 2014 Wilson was named to the Forbes 30 Under 30 list, a pick the publication would notably regret nine years later. On May 6, 2015, Defense Distributed and the Second Amendment Foundation filed Defense Distributed v. U.S. Dept. of State, a constitutional challenge of the ITAR regime used to control speech. On July 10, 2018, the State Department offered to settle the lawsuit and Wilson continued to work at DEFCAD. Wilson briefly resigned from the company in 2018 after being indicted for sexual assault. In September 2019, after accepting a plea deal and probation, he rejoined the company.

In August 2026, a federal district court ruled in Defense Distributed v. Blanche that two provisions of the ATF's 2022 "frame or receiver" rule are unconstitutional under the Second Amendment and void for vagueness under the Fifth Amendment. The court barred enforcement of those provisions against Defense Distributed and members of the Second Amendment Foundation but did not strike the rule down the whole rule.

=== Dark Wallet ===
In 2013, Wilson, along with Amir Taaki, began work on a Bitcoin cryptocurrency wallet called Dark Wallet, a project planned to anonymize financial transactions. He appeared at the SXSW festival in Austin in 2014 to discuss Dark Wallet.

=== Bitcoin Foundation ===
On U.S. election day, November 4, 2014, Wilson announced that he would stand for election to a seat on the board of directors of the Bitcoin Foundation, with "the sole purpose of destroying the Foundation." He said, "I will run on a platform of the complete dissolution of the Bitcoin Foundation and will begin and end every single one of my public statements with that message." The Bitcoin Foundation seats sought by Wilson were ultimately won by Jim Harper and Olivier Janssen.

=== Hatreon ===
In 2017, Wilson launched Hatreon.us, an "alt-right version of Patreon" providing crowdfunding and payment services for groups and individuals banned from platforms including Kickstarter, Patreon, PayPal, and Stripe. The site attracted notable alt-right and neo-Nazi figures such as Andrew Anglin and Richard B. Spencer. Wilson said that Hatreon clients included "right-wing women, people of color, and transgender people"; Bloomberg News reported that most donations went to white supremacists. According to Hannah Shearer, staff attorney at the Giffords Law Center to Prevent Gun Violence, Hatreon users incited violence contrary to Hatreon's terms of service, which forbid illegal activity.

Hatreon.us claimed to have received about $25,000 a month in donations (equivalent to $32,053 in 2025). The site took a five percent cut of donations. Several months after Hatreon's launch, Visa, the site's payments processor, suspended its financial services. With no means of processing payments, the site became inactive.

== Political and economic views ==
Wilson claims an array of influences from anti-state and libertarian political thinkers including mutualist theorist Pierre-Joseph Proudhon, paleolibertarian anarcho-capitalists like Austrian School economist Hans-Hermann Hoppe, and classical liberals such as Frederic Bastiat. His political thought has been compared to the "conservative revolutionary" ideas of Ernst Jünger. Jacob Siegel wrote that "Cody Wilson arrives at a place where left, right—and democracy—disappear" and that he oscillates "somewhere between anarch and anarchist".

Wilson is an avowed crypto-anarchist, and has discussed his work in relation to the cypherpunks and Timothy May's vision. He did not vote in the 2016 United States presidential election. He frequently cites the work of post-Marxist thinkers in public comments, especially that of Jean Baudrillard, whom he has claimed as his "master". Asked during an interview with Popular Science if the Sandy Hook Elementary School shooting affected his thinking or plans in any way, Wilson responded: "understanding that rights and civil liberties are something that we protect is also understanding that they have consequences that are also protected, or tolerated. The exercise of civil liberties is antithetical to the idea of a completely totalizing state. That's just the way it is."

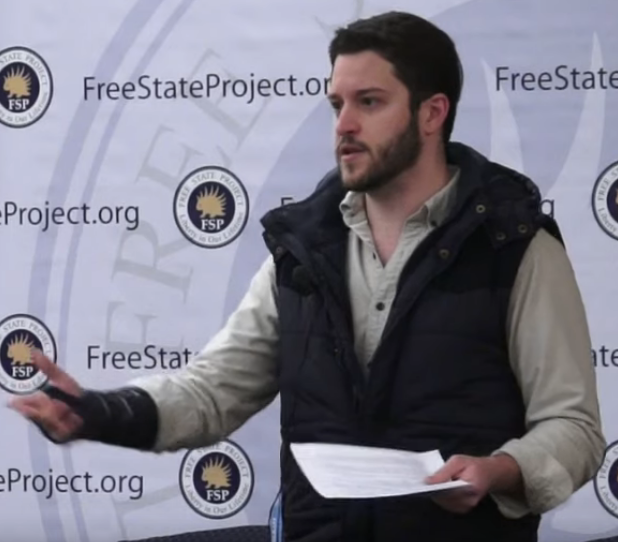
Cody Wilson discussing 3D printed guns at Liberty Forum in Nashua, New Hampshire in February 2014

In a January 2013 interview with Glenn Beck about the nature of and motivations behind his effort to develop and share gun 3D printable files Wilson said: "(It's) a real political act, giving you a magazine, telling you that it will never be taken away... That's real politics. That's radical equality. That's what I believe in... I'm just resisting. What am I resisting? I don't know, the collectivization of manufacture? The institutionalization of the human psyche? I'm not sure. But I can tell you one thing: this is a symbol of irreversibility. They can never eradicate the gun from the earth."

=== Intellectual Property ===
Wilson's "Black Flag White Paper."

Wilson is generally opposed to intellectual property rights. He has indicated a primary goal of the subversion of state structures and the dismantling of the existing system of capitalist property relations. Wilson rejects the concept of copyrighting gun designs. As he put it in his 2024 Black Flag White Paper, Defense Distributed used open-source licenses for its work because they "frustrate state and world government attempts to control 3D gun files." He draws a direct line between copyright registration and gun confiscation:

"Everybody knows registration of your firearms is the prelude—the first step toward confiscation. How does that not apply to registering your 3D printed gun files with the federal government? It's noxious."

== Personal life ==
Originally from Little Rock, Arkansas, Wilson was student body president at Cabot High School in Cabot, Arkansas and graduated in 2006. He received a bachelor's degree in English from the University of Central Arkansas (UCA) in 2010, where he had a scholarship. While at UCA, Wilson was a member of Sigma Phi Epsilon fraternity and was the president of UCA's student government association. He traveled to China with UCA's study-abroad program.

In 2012, he studied at the University of Texas School of Law but left the university in May 2013 after two years.

=== 2018 criminal case ===
In August 2018, Wilson was accused of paying a 16-year-old girl $500 for sex in a hotel room in Austin, Texas. When police issued a warrant for his arrest on September 19, 2018, Wilson was in Taipei, Taiwan. He was arrested by Taiwanese authorities after the U.S. cancelled his passport and therefore he no longer held a valid visa. Taiwan's National Immigration Agency subsequently deported him to the United States. After his return on September 23, 2018, he was released on $150,000 bond (equivalent to $192,320 in 2025) from Harris County Jail in Houston.

On December 28, 2018, Wilson was indicted by the State of Texas for sexual assault, a second-degree felony. Wilson's defense attorney, F. Andino Reynal, stated that Wilson believed the girl to be a consenting adult, and that SugarDaddyMeet.com, the website where they met, required users to declare they are at least 18 years of age before they could create an account.

On August 9, 2019, Wilson pleaded guilty to injury of a child, a third-degree felony, in exchange for a deferred adjudication and a seven-year term of probation. He was sentenced to seven years of probation, 475 hours of community service, and a $1,200 fine. As part of his probation terms, Wilson was required to register as a sex offender for the duration of his probation. During the sentencing hearing, Judge Brad Urrutia noted there was "sufficient evidence to find you guilty beyond a reasonable doubt" for more than the negotiated charge.

In 2023, Vice reported that Wilson completed his probation in November 2022, after which the charges and case were dismissed as provided for under the terms of his plea agreement.

== Works ==
=== Bibliography ===
- Come and Take It: The Gun Printer's Guide to Thinking Free. New York: Gallery Books (2016). ISBN 978-1476778266.
- Black Flag White Paper. Austin: DEFCAD (2024). ISBN 979-8988553816.

=== Filmography ===
As himself

- After Newtown: Guns in America (2013)
- Print the Legend (2014)
- Deep Web (2015)
- No Control (2015)
- The New Radical (2017)
- Death Athletic: A Dissident Architecture (2023)

As producer

- TFW NO GF (2020) A documentary by Alex Lee Moyer.
