= Joint Regional Intelligence Center =

The Joint Regional Intelligence Center (JRIC) was established in 2006 as a cooperative effort between United States federal, state, and local law enforcement and public safety agencies to centralize the intake, analysis, synthesis, and appropriate dissemination of terrorism-related threat intelligence for the greater Los Angeles region. In 2010, the JRIC merged with the Los Angeles Joint Drug Intelligence Group (JDIG) component of the Los Angeles High Intensity Drug Trafficking Area (LA HIDTA), Intelligence Support System (ISS), which includes the Los Angeles Regional Criminal Information Clearinghouse (LA CLEAR) and the Inland Narcotics Clearing House (INCH) to create a consolidated regional all-crimes intelligence fusion entity in accordance with the HIDTA mission. The JRIC also serves as the Regional Threat Assessment Center (RTAC) for the Central District of California as part of the California State Threat Assessment System (STAS). The center follows guidelines established by the US Department of Justice and US Department of Homeland Security, and contributes to the national Criminal Intelligence Sharing Plan.

The JRIC area of responsibility includes the counties of Los Angeles, Orange, Riverside, San Bernardino, San Luis Obispo, Santa Barbara, and Ventura. Covering nearly 40,000 square miles, and home to more than 18.5 million people, the region contains nationally critical assets and key resources whose smooth functioning directly affect the day-to-day health of the US economy, including national supply chains, logistics backbones, and energy security.

== Sources ==
https://www.jric.org/default.aspx/MenuItemID/285/MenuGroup/_Home.htm
