= Ghost Gunner =

American manufacturer of desktop CNC mills

- Industry: CNC Milling
- Founded: October 1, 2014
- Founders: Cody Wilson; Defense Distributed
- Headquarters: Austin, Texas
- Key people: Cody R. Wilson (CEO)
- Products: Ghost Gunner; Ghost Gunner 2 Ghost Gunner 3
- Parent: Defense Distributed
- Website: ghostgunner.net

Ghost Gunner is an American desktop CNC mill manufactured in Austin, Texas. It specializes in the making of firearms as well as finishing 0%–80% receivers. It was launched in October 2014 by Cody Wilson and the founders of Defense Distributed.

== History ==
Ghost Gunner began as a limited series of CNC mills produced by Defense Distributed in a crowdfunding sale to its mailing list in October 2014. Spring 2015 shipments sold out almost immediately, and its first media reviewer noted the machine "...worked so well that it may signal a new era in the gun control debate, one where the barrier to legally building an untraceable, durable, and deadly semi-automatic rifle has reached an unprecedented low point in cost and skill."

== Products ==
Since 2014, Ghost Gunner has issued 3 generations of its CNC mill, with the latest being the Ghost Gunner 3. The second version, named Ghost Gunner 2, is open-source hardware, allowing third-party manufacturers to sell their own versions. As of July 2018, Ghost Gunner had sold over 6,000 units worldwide. The most recent version of the Ghost Gunner accepts "Zero Percent Receivers," solid blocks of aluminum that are milled into a partial lower receiver of an AR-15 style rifle. These are in contrast to the 80 percent receivers first released with the Ghost Gunner.

== Political controversy ==
Ghost Gunner is cited by politicians and the media as the most popular machine tool used to produce ghost guns.

In May 2024, San Diego County, joined by The Giffords Law Center, brought suit against Ghost Gunner in California state court arguing that it violated a state law "blocking gun-making milling machines" in developing and selling the Coast Runner CNC.
