= Defense Distributed =

American non-profit developing digital firearm schematics

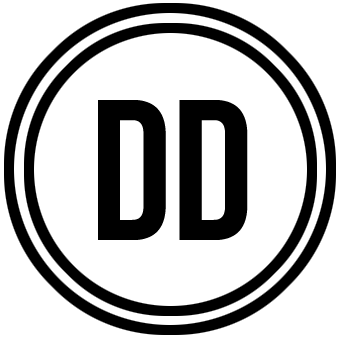
- Type: Nonprofit
- Founded: October 16, 2012; 14 years ago in Austin, Texas, U.S.
- Founders: Cody Wilson; Benjamin Denio
- Products: Ghost Gunner; DEFCAD
- Website: defdist.org

Defense Distributed is an online, open-source hardware and software organization that develops digital schematics for firearms as CAD files that may be downloaded from the Internet and used in 3D printing or CNC milling applications. Its purpose is to support and defend the popular production of homemade firearms.

The company is best known for developing and releasing the files for the Liberator, the world's first completely 3D printed gun. When Defense Distributed first published these printable STL files in 2013, the United States Department of State demanded they be removed from the Internet, citing a violation of the International Traffic in Arms Regulations.

In 2015, Defense Distributed, joined by the Second Amendment Foundation (SAF), filed Defense Distributed v. U.S. Dept. of State in the Western District of Texas, leading the United States to offer a settlement in 2018. Since July 2018, Defense Distributed has released its files to the public domain at DEFCAD while federal courts have been petitioned to stop it. On April 27, 2021, the United States Court of Appeals for the Ninth Circuit ordered the dismissal of the last suit challenging the settlement in Defense Distributed I, and the company has been publishing ever since. Multiple federal and state laws and lawsuits now challenge the legality of these publications, and the protected speech content of 3D printable gun files.

== History ==
=== Founding ===
After raising US$2,000 via a suspended crowd-funding appeal, suffering the confiscation of its first 3D printer, and partnering with private manufacturing firms, Defense Distributed began live-fire testing of the first generation of printable firearms in December 2012.

In its first year of operation the organization produced a durable printed receiver for the AR-15, the first printed standard capacity AR-15 magazine, and the first printed magazine for the AK-47. These 3D printable files were made available for download at the organization's publishing site DEFCAD, and are widely hosted on file-sharing websites.

Defense Distributed has been predominantly represented in public since July 2012 by Cody Wilson, the company's founder and spokesperson. In September 2018, Wilson briefly resigned from the company while under indictment for sexual assault, returning to his role in late 2019.

=== Purpose ===
According to the Defense Distributed website, the nonprofit was founded as "the first private defense contractor in service of the general public," in order to "[advance] the state of the art in small scale, digital, personal gunsmithing." In court records the organization claims "to publish and distribute... such information and knowledge in promotion of the public interest."

The organization's motivations have been described as "less about [a] gun... than about democratizing manufacturing technology," In an interview with Slashdot, Cody Wilson described the Wiki Weapon project as a chance to "experiment with Enlightenment ideas… to literally materialize freedom."

At Bitcoin 2012 in London, Wilson described the organization as interested in inspiring libertarian forms of social organization and technologically-driven inversions of authority.

== Products ==
=== DEFCAD ===
In December 2012, as a response to Makerbot Industries' removal of firearms-related 3D printable files at the popular repository Thingiverse, Defense Distributed launched a companion site at defcad.org to publicly host the removed 3D files alongside its own. Public and community submissions to DEFCAD rose rapidly, and in March 2013, at the SXSW Interactive festival, Wilson announced a repurposed and expanded DEFCAD as a separate entity that would serve as a 3D search engine and development hub, while maintaining the spirit of access endemic to Defense Distributed. DEFCAD has been called "The Pirate Bay of 3D Printing" and "the anti-Makerbot".

=== Ghost Gunner ===
In October 2014, Defense Distributed began selling to the public a miniature CNC mill for completing receivers for the AR-15 semi-automatic rifle. For a review of the machine in Wired, reporter Andy Greenberg manufactured a series of lower receivers and called the machine "absurdly easy to use." Since 2016 the Ghost Gunner has been recognized as the most popular machine tool for the production of privately made firearms.

=== G80 ===
In 2025, Defense Distributed released the G80, an 80% receiver platform designed to comply with the requirements established in Bondi v. VanDerStok, which established that firearm receiver kits are legal if they: (a) ship without every necessary component, (b) require uncommon tools, and (c) take an hour or more to complete.

The G80 platform consists of three components: an unfinished receiver made from heat-treated billet steel, a grip module manufactured using Multi Jet Fusion PA11 Black material, and a specialized jig designed for either manual or CNC completion methods. The system is compatible with Glock G19 Gen3 components and magazines.

The G80's release came after major competitors in the 80% receiver market ceased operations due to legal challenges. Polymer80, once the largest manufacturer of 80% firearm kits, shut down in July 2024 following numerous lawsuits and regulatory pressures. Defense Distributed positioned the G80 as "the new standard in federal compliance" for privately made firearms.

In August 2026, U.S. District judge Reed O'Connor issued a judgment legalizing G80 built kits and receivers nationwide.

=== GatGPT ===
In October 2026, Defense Distributed released an AI coding agent and software development environment named "GatGPT-2." Its agent features are described as an "AI gunsmith" "trained on DEFCAD’s expansive library of gun files" that can "carry out multi-step programming tasks from natural-language instructions." The company claimed to have used GatGPT to develop "The WASP," a .22 caliber 3D-printed firearm hailed as the first to be made entirely by an AI.

== Administration ==
=== Legal history ===
Defense Distributed once sought 501(c)(3) federal tax exemption, but its application was denied by the IRS.

The organization operates to publish intellectual property and information developed by licensed firearms manufacturers and the public.

Cody Wilson has had a Type 7 Federal Firearms License (FFL).

== Legal challenges ==
=== Stratasys confiscation ===
Learning of Defense Distributed's plans in 2012, manufacturer Stratasys, Ltd threatened legal action and demanded the return of a 3D printer it had leased to Wilson. On September 26, before the printer was assembled for use, Wilson received an email from Stratasys suggesting that he might use the printer "...for illegal purposes..." Stratasys canceled its lease with Wilson and sent a team to confiscate the printer. Wilson was subsequently questioned by the ATF when visiting an agency field office in Austin, Texas to inquire about legalities and regulations related to the Wiki Weapon project.

=== The Undetectable Firearms Act ===
Defense Distributed's efforts have prompted renewed discussion of the Undetectable Firearms Act. The Liberator pistol was cited in White House and Congressional calls to renew the Act in 2013.

=== International Traffic in Arms Regulations ===
Letter from the United States Department of State to Defense Distributed (May 8, 2013).

On May 9, 2013, The United States Department of State Directorate of Defense Trade Controls (DDTC) directed Defense Distributed to remove the download links to its publicly accessible CAD files. The State Department's letter, prompted by the Liberator Pistol, referenced § 127.1 of the International Traffic in Arms Regulations (ITAR), interpreted the regulations to impose a prior approval requirement on the publication of Defense Distributed's files into the public domain, a legal position noted at the time to suffer from First and Second Amendment infirmities.

=== Code as Speech ===
==== Defense Distributed v. U.S. Dept. of State ====
On May 6, 2015, Defense Distributed, joined by the Second Amendment Foundation, filed a Constitutional challenge against the State Department in the Western District of Texas, suing agents of the DDTC and accusing the federal government of knowingly violating the company's First, Second, and Fifth amendment rights.

After years of litigation, on July 10, 2018, Wired magazine reported Defense Distributed and SAF had accepted a settlement offer from the Department of State. Cody Wilson announced the immediate relaunch of DEFCAD and the release 3D gun files into the public domain. These releases occurred on July 27, 2018.

==== State of Washington et al v. United States Department of State et al ====
A coalition of state attorneys general sued to enjoin the 2018 settlement in Defense Distributed v. U.S. Dept. of State, citing "...irreparable harm if the [firearm CAD files] [were] published on the internet." Defense Distributed joined the suit as a necessary party, claiming the states lacked Article III standing, and the protection of its activity under the First Amendment. U.S. District Judge Robert Lasnik issued a temporary restraining order against the State Department on July 31, 2018, and granted a permanent injunction on November 12, 2019. He ruled the State Department had failed to give an adequate explanation of its settlement with Defense Distributed, as required by the Administrative Procedure Act.

Defense Distributed appealed Lasnik's injunction to the Ninth Circuit Court of Appeals, which rejected the case in July 2020, ruling the organization lacked the standing to appeal a decision directed at the State Department. On April 27, 2021, however, the Ninth Circuit vacated an injunction in a related case, holding that Congress had expressly prohibited judicial review of the agency decisions in question. Defense Distributed again released its library of 3D files to the public domain.

==== Defense Distributed v. Gurbir Grewal ====
In July 2018, at the same time as State of Washington v. Department of State, Defense Distributed filed a civil lawsuit under section 1983 of the Civil Rights Act against New Jersey Attorney General Gurbir Grewal, who sent a cease and desist letter directing the firm not to publish the files subject to their settlement with the U.S. Department of State. Defense Distributed argued New Jersey law had no power over its settlement and that using its laws to fight the file publication was unconstitutional.

Though originally dismissed in district court over a question of personal jurisdiction, on appeal in August 2020 the Fifth Circuit Court of Appeals reversed the lower court and allowed the lawsuit to proceed in Texas. On March 29, 2021, the Supreme Court denied Grewal's petition for a writ of certiorari, affirming the Fifth Circuit's decision, and remanding the case to the district court.

==== Defense Distributed v. Bruck ====
After remand to Texas, and after Andrew Bruck succeeded Gurbir Grewal as Attorney General, the district court severed Defense Distributed's claims against New Jersey and transferred them to a federal court there. Defense Distributed again appealed the district court to the Fifth Circuit Court of Appeals, who reversed the lower court and held its order severing and transferring the claims against the AG to the District of New Jersey was an abuse of discretion. In its opinion, the Fifth Circuit made the rare request to the district court in New Jersey to transfer the 3D gun case back to Texas, which the court refused, creating an unprecedented judicial "turf fight."

==== Defense Distributed v. Attorney General of New Jersey ====
The New Jersey district court refused to transfer the case against Attorney General Bruck back to Texas and dismissed the case in 2023, triggering an appeal to the Third Circuit Court of Appeals. A panel for the Third Circuit heard arguments concerning Defense Distributed's First Amendment claims, which it called “the heart of the case" in its 2026 opinion. In a landmark decision, the court acknowledged that “whether regulations of computer code trigger constitutional scrutiny under the First Amendment” raised “a complicated question of first impression” for the Third Circuit. It began with a “fresh appraisal” of First Amendment cases dealing with computer code from the Ninth, Sixth, and Second Circuits. The Third Circuit agreed with its sister circuits that computer code can be covered by the First Amendment, but it emphasized that “coverage cannot be assumed.”

=== Definition of Frame or Receiver ===
In late 2022, Defense Distributed, joined by the Second Amendment Foundation, intervened in VanDerStok v. Garland, a suit challenging the ATF's 2021 "Frame or Receiver" rule, ATF2021R-05F. On March 3, 2023, Judge Reed O'Connor of the Northern District of Texas granted Defense Distributed injunctive relief against the ATF, and on June 30, 2023, he granted the company's motion for summary judgment against the agency. On appeal, the U.S. Supreme Court ultimately reversed the District court and the Fifth Circuit, ruling 7–2 that the agency had not exceeded its statutory authority in creating the new rule, and remanded the case back to Texas for further proceedings.

==== Defense Distributed v. Blanche ====
Upon remand to Texas, Defense Distributed and the Second Amendment Foundation in Defense Distributed v. Blanche moved for summary judgment against the Biden-era "frame or receiver" rule on Second Amendment and Fifth Amendment grounds. In August 2026, District judge Reed O'Connor granted the plaintiffs' motion for summary judgment and issued injunctive and declaratory relief against ATF. Defense Distributed was authorized to sell its products nationwide.

== Reception ==
Despite a decade of legal challenges, Defense Distributed's (and other) firearms CAD files have always been on the internet. The files remain available on mirror websites, Twitter, Thingiverse, and GitHub, and have been downloaded millions of times worldwide from Odysee and via peer-to-peer torrent services.

The company has been supported by the Second Amendment Foundation, the Firearms Policy Coalition, and Gun Owners of America (GOA).

Open-source software advocate Eric S. Raymond endorsed the organization and its efforts, calling Defense Distributed "friends of freedom" and writing "I approve of any development that makes it more difficult for governments and criminals to monopolize the use of force. As 3D printers become less expensive and more ubiquitous, this could be a major step in the right direction."

Aaron Timms of Blouin News wrote Defense Distributed has performed "...the greatest piece of political performance art of [the 21st] century."

Defense Distributed has been accused by critics of endangering public safety and attempting to frustrate and alter the U. S. system of government. However, critics have also noted that Defense Distributed has capitalized on the necessary social consequences of new technology, similar to those the printing press had on the spread of information and the decentralization of power in the Renaissance.

== See also ==
- 3D printed firearms
- Right to keep and bear arms
- Code as speech
- Gun control
- Gun politics in the United States
- List of notable 3D printed weapons and parts
- Deterrence Dispensed
