= Homemade firearm =

Firearm made by a private individual

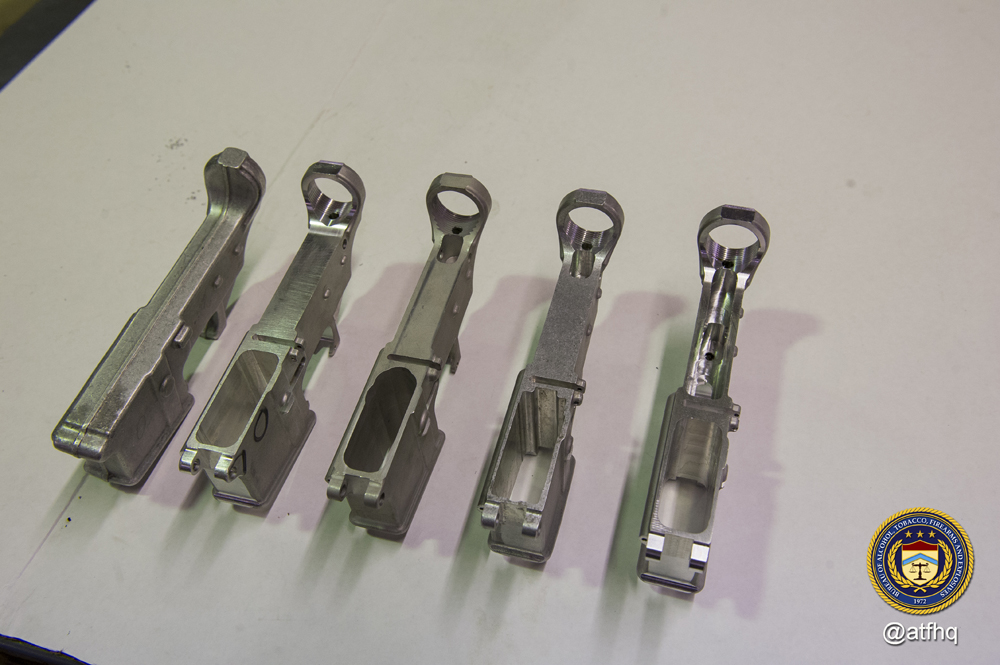
Receiver blanks in various stages of completion. Receiver blanks are often used in the manufacture of homemade firearms.

A homemade firearm, also called a ghost gun or privately made firearm (PMF), is a firearm made by a private individual, in contrast to one produced by a corporate or government entity. The term ghost gun is used mostly in the United States, where it was coined by gun control advocates to describe the untraceability of such weapons, but has also been reappropriated by the Bureau of Alcohol, Tobacco, Firearms, and Explosives (ATF), some gun rights advocates and the firearm industry.

== Production ==
=== United States ===
Under U.S. federal law, the creation of a firearm for non-commercial purposes (i.e., personal use) has, almost without exception, been unlicensed and legal. Second Amendment scholars note unconstitutional attempts to restrict access to homemade firearms is a problem as old as the Constitution itself. Since the passage of the Gun Control Act of 1968, however, anyone intending to manufacture firearms for sale or distribution is required to obtain a Federal Firearms License, and each firearm made is required to bear a unique serial number.

In 2022, the Bureau of Alcohol, Tobacco, Firearms, and Explosives (ATF) issued a rule that determined "buy build shoot" kits, which the ATF claimed could be assembled into functioning firearms in as little as 20 minutes, fit within the definition of "frame or receiver" used in the Gun Control Act of 1968. The ATF regulation, Final Rule 2021-05F, went into effect on August 24, 2022. This regulation expanded upon the current terms used in the Code of Federal Regulations by addition of the following:

"The term [firearm] shall [also] include a weapon parts kit that is designed to or may readily be completed, assembled, restored, or otherwise converted to expel a projectile by the action of an explosive." (Note: The term "readily" with respect to firearms is defined in another regulation (27 C.F.R. 478.12(c)), and the ATF stated in a December 2022 open letter that the same definition applies to all firearm frames and receivers.)

The ATF rule thus required such kits to have serial numbers, required manufacturers of such kits to be licensed, and required commercial sellers of such kits to conduct background checks for purchasers. Under U.S. law, the frame or receiver of a firearm is treated as though it were a firearm itself; accordingly, both are subject to similar regulations.

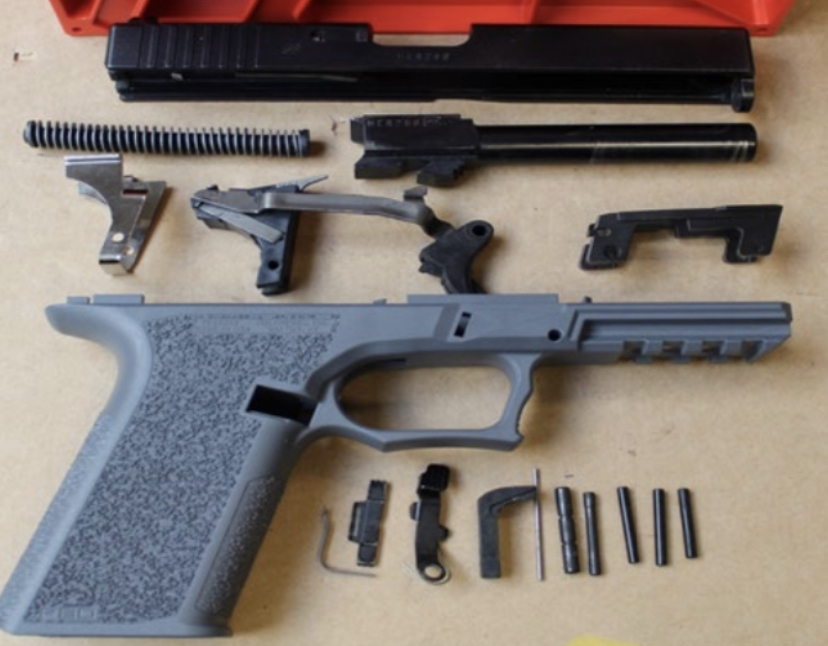
Example of a firearm parts kit regulated by ATF Rule 2021R-05F

The rule was challenged in court by gun advocacy groups, and a U.S. district judge in Texas, Reed O'Connor, ruled in 2023 that the ATF rule exceeded the agency's authority and issued a nationwide injunction blocking the rule. However, the U.S. has appealed to the Fifth Circuit, and O'Connor's injunction was stayed by the U.S. Supreme Court, allowing the rule to go into effect pending further proceedings.

While some states have passed laws restricting the creation of homemade firearms, in most states unfinished receivers are sold without requiring a federal or state background check.

==== History ====
Most receiver blanks from the 20th century could be finished with hand tools, a drill press, or machine tools. Certain companies in the 1990s began to sell receiver kits that could include drill bits, stencils, or jigs to aid the finishing process.

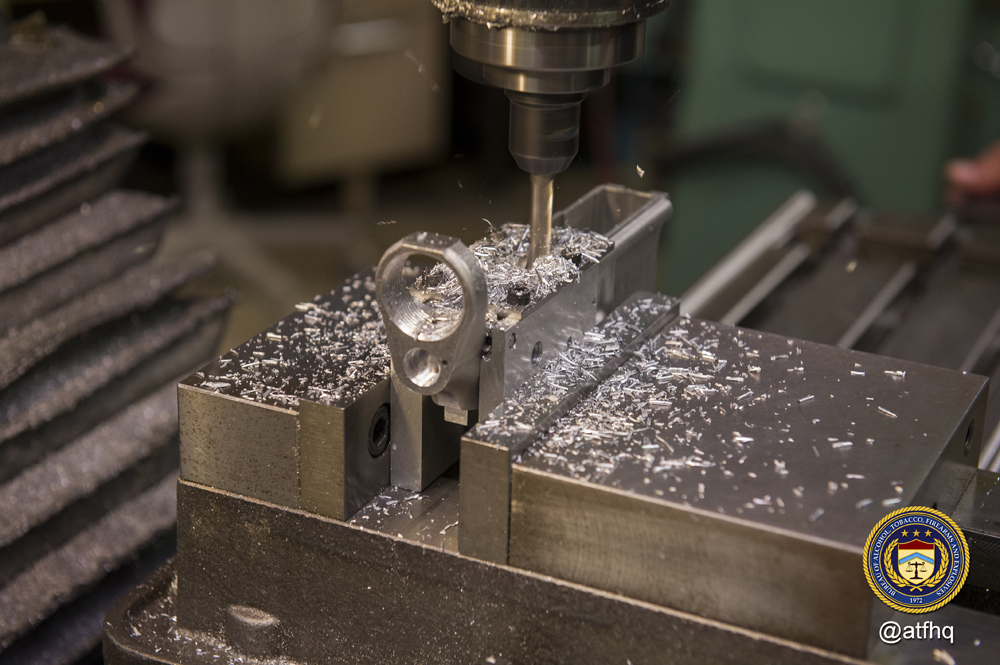
Milling of the fire-control group in a receiver blank

Starting in the 2010s, polymer receiver blanks and kits became popular, which require only hand tools for finishing. Polymer80, based in Dayton, Nevada, became well known for being a top producer of such receivers.

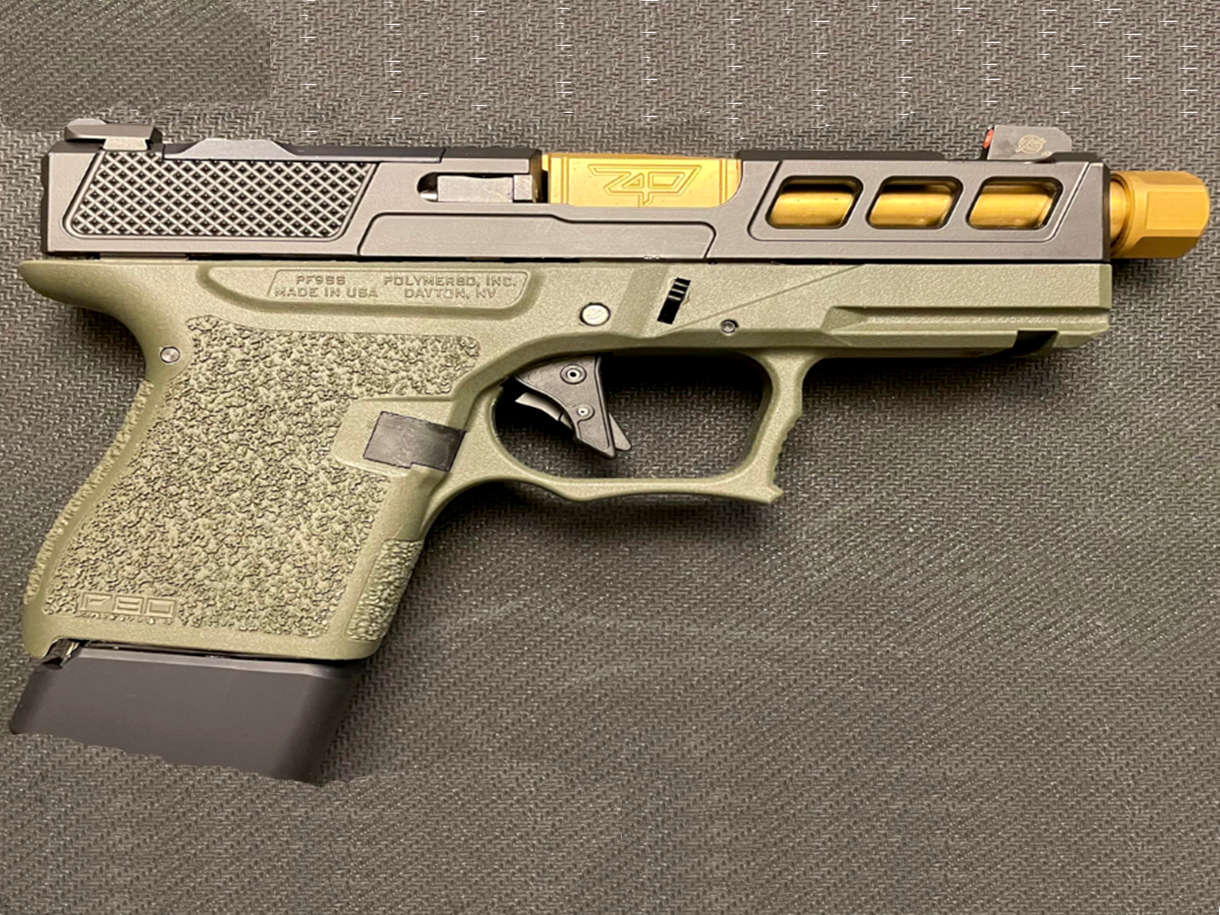
A privately made pistol with a polymer frame

It has always been possible to make firearms from raw materials, and more recently it has become popular among firearms hobbyists to produce receivers from plastic with a 3D printer, though the variety of materials and methods used to create these receivers are of varying quality.

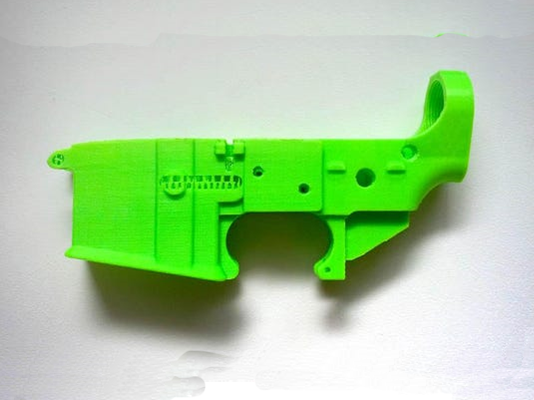
An AR-15-esque (lower) receiver blank created using a 3D printer

A popular machine tool for completing receiver blanks is a CNC mill. The company Defense Distributed sells a CNC milling machine named the Ghost Gunner for this purpose. The Ghost Gunner was first sold in 2014, when the term "ghost gun" became popularized.

AR-15-style firearms are often made as homemade firearms. AR-15s are modular firearms, and maker's marks are usually applied to the lower receiver, which houses the trigger group. A person with an AR-15 lower receiver can assemble a complete firearm using widely available, commercial and unregulated components, such as barrels, stocks, and upper receivers.

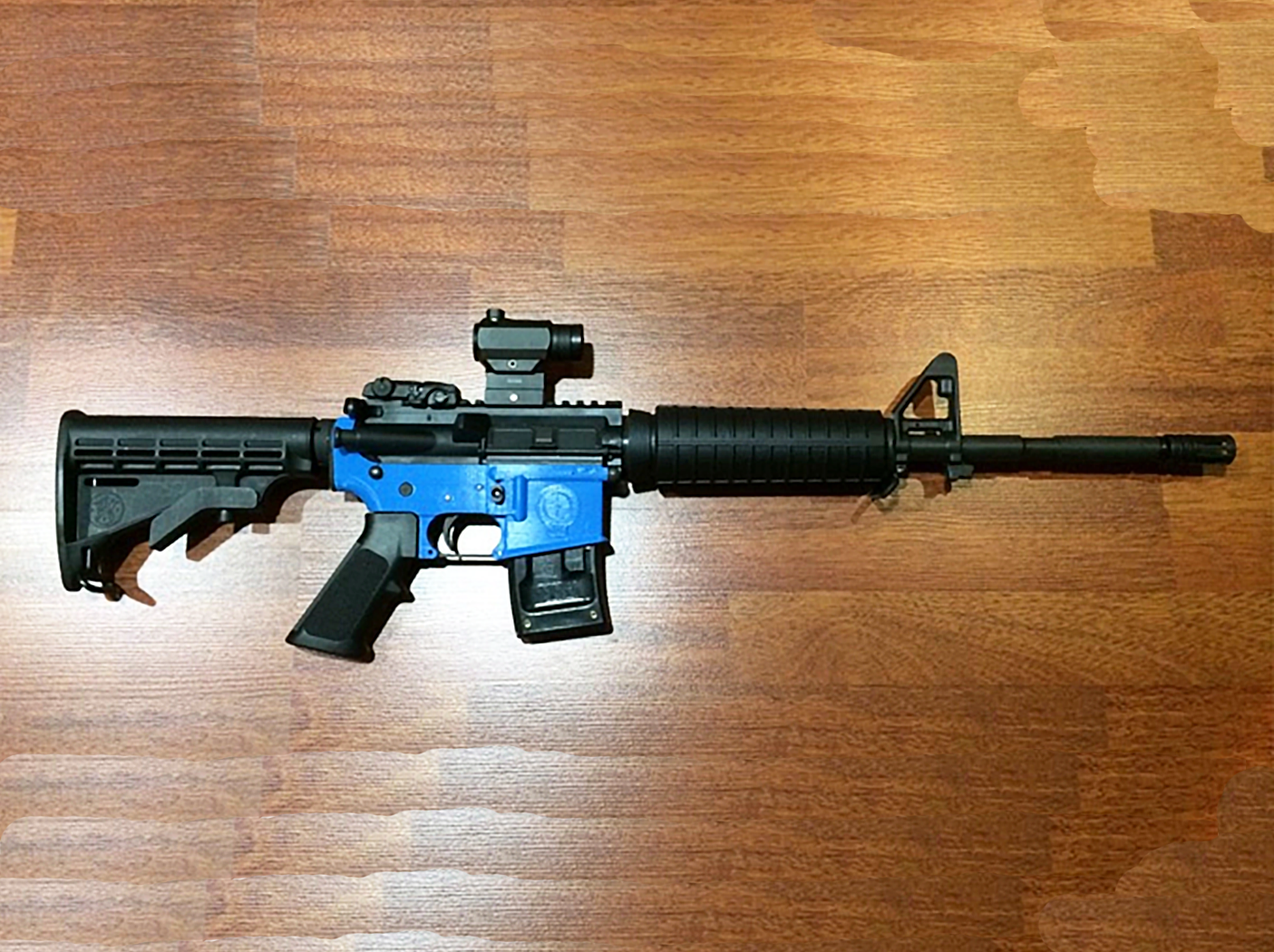
A homemade firearm built in the style of the ArmaLite Rifle 15

Pistols and AK-47-style semi-automatic rifles are also popularly made as homemade firearms. The Intelligence Division of the New York City Police Department has published a survey and compendium of homemade firearm types.

=== Non-U.S. jurisdictions ===
Overseas production centers of clandestine homemade firearms include China, the Khyber Pass area of Pakistan, and the Philippines; the Philippines are especially known for the production of .45 caliber semi-automatic pistols.

== Political controversy ==
=== Traceability ===
Because they lack serial numbers and manufacturer identification, homemade firearms are more difficult to trace than conventional firearms.

To help trace homemade firearms used in crime and assist detectives in criminal investigations, ATF officials have advised law enforcement agencies to submit evidence obtained in investigations to the National Integrated Ballistic Information Network (NIBIN).

In a 2021 commentary on firearms in the journal Injury Epidemiology, firearm violence expert Garen Wintemute wrote that "The potential for large-scale, clandestine firearm manufacture in support of armed extremist groups is cause for great concern." Wintemute wrote that the relative inexpensiveness of 3D-printing equipment could facilitate the growths of arsenals held by violent extremist organizations. Mexican drug cartels are reported to be developing 3D-printed grenade launchers.

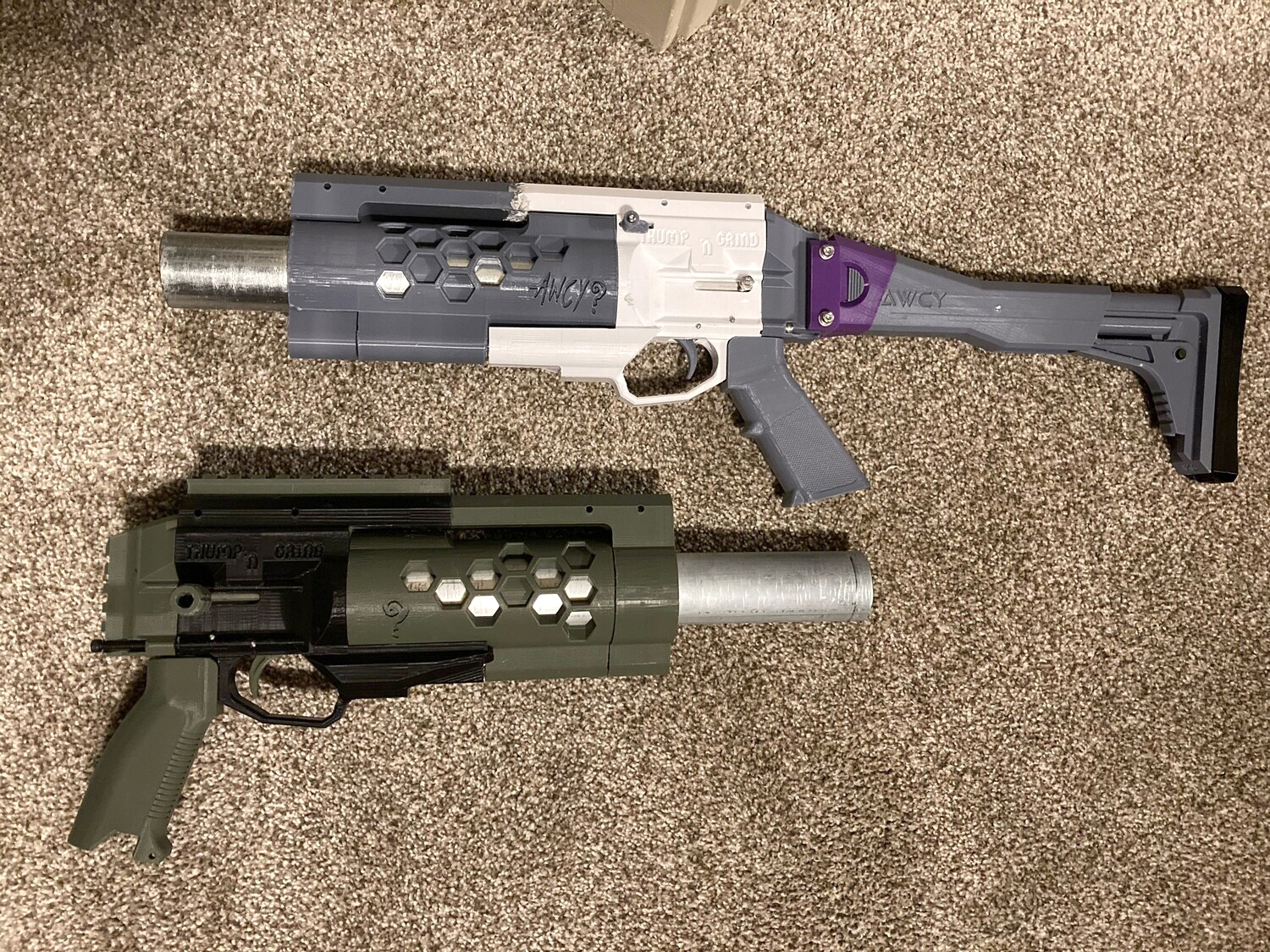
Two privately manufactured 37mm destructive devices

While there are no reliable statistics on how many homemade firearms are being recovered in crimes, since the issue rose to prominence in California, the ATF has documented recoveries of homemade firearms in 38 States plus DC, Puerto Rico, and the Virgin Islands. The ATF noted an increasing number of homemade firearm seizures every year since 2016, and over 1,600 of these firearms have been entered into NIBIN.

=== Advocates ===
Gun rights activists support the private production of firearms, claiming the practice as a constitutional right and a way to maintain the privacy of gun owners. Individuals have organized "build parties" where equipment and expertise are shared to help create homemade firearms. Advocates say that homemade firearms are rarely used in crime despite widespread ownership. Gun rights advocates and law enforcement assert that because of the cost and effort required to make homemade firearms, criminals would prefer to steal firearms for use in crime, a fact borne out by DOJ statistics. While the ATF does not track homemade firearms, the FBI reports that their use in crimes is increasing.

=== Notable crimes ===
Noted crimes in which homemade firearms were used include the shooting sprees in Rancho Tehama, California (2017), Baltimore, Maryland (2017), and Kingsessing, Philadelphia (2023). In each of these cases, the shooter used home-assembled AR-15–style rifles. The weapon allegedly used by the suspect in the 2024 killing of UnitedHealthcare CEO Brian Thompson is believed by authorities to have been homemade as well. Recently, law enforcement officials in the United States have begun encountering privately made machine gun conversion devices. Devices such as the Glock switch have been used in crimes such as the 2022 Sacramento shooting.

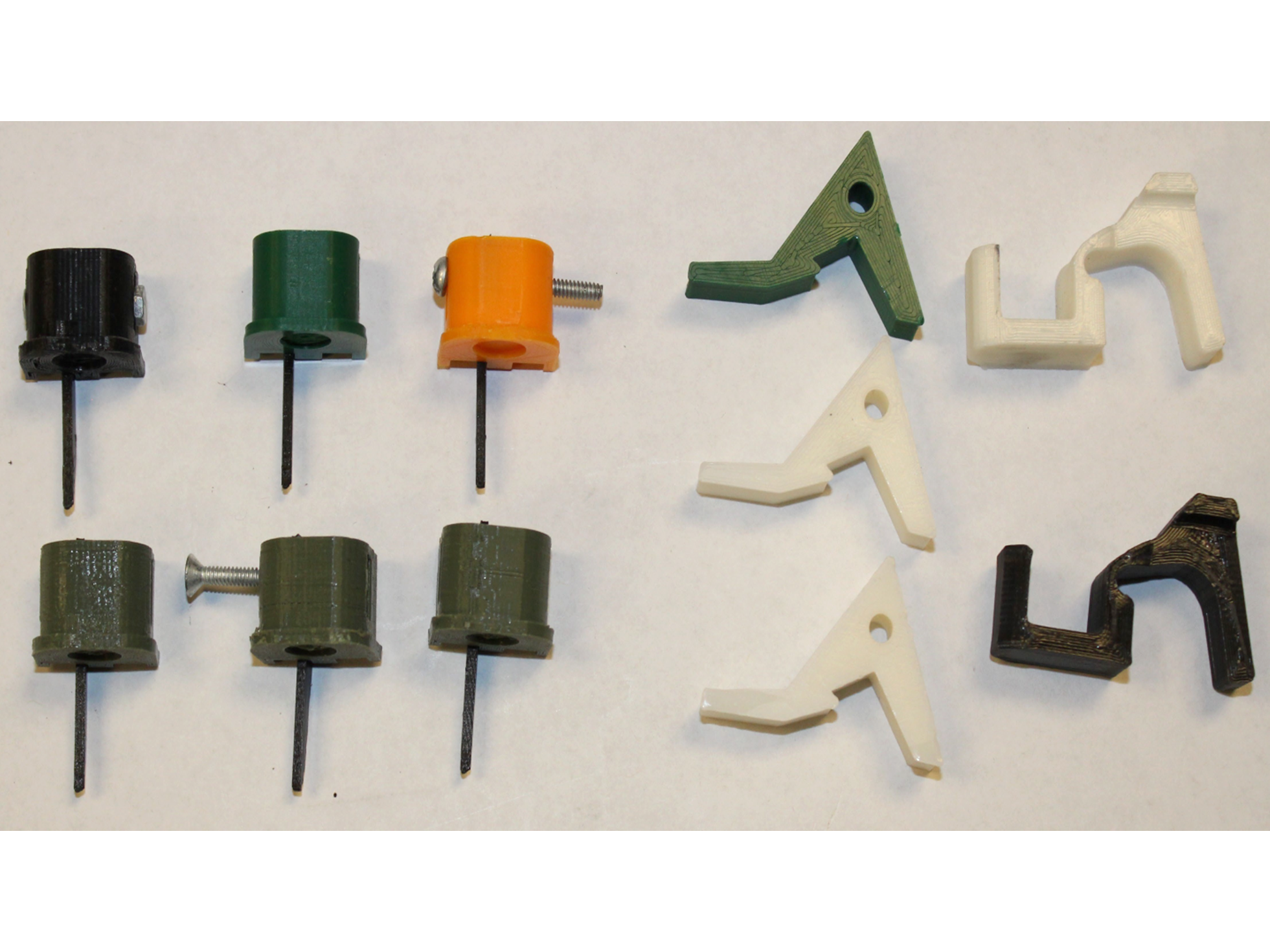
Example of privately made machinegun conversion devices. The devices on the left are Glock switches. The devices on the righthand side are known as 'swift links'. They are used in Glock handguns and AR-15–style rifles, respectively.

On July 8, 2022, former Japanese prime minister Shinzo Abe was assassinated in Nara, Japan, using a homemade "zip-gun" that was electrically fired via a metal filament wire heating up near the propellant.

== U.S. law ==
=== U.S. federal law ===
Congress passed the Gun Control Act of 1968 or the GCA to expand interstate commerce controls over common firearms like handguns, shotguns and rifles. The GCA requires those who are "engaged in the business" of manufacturing or dealing in firearms to be licensed by the ATF. Federal firearms licensees are required to mark their firearms' serial numbers and keep records of their transactions. The GCA also prohibits certain categories of persons, like convicted felons, domestic abusers, current users of illicit drugs and others, from possessing firearms.

To help enforce these prohibitions, Congress passed the Brady Act in 1993, creating the National Instant Criminal Background Check System, or NICS, and requiring FFLs to submit potential firearms purchaser information to NICS before transferring firearms.

While Congress passed the GCA as a response to the assassination of then-President John F. Kennedy, its drafters expressly added that the Act was not intended to place any undue burden on law-abiding citizens who use or make firearms for lawful, private purposes.

==== ATF enforcement and discretion ====
The ATF's involvement in regulating homemade firearms is primarily through its regulation of the receiver blanks commonly used to create such firearms. The ATF has exerted enforcement discretion in determining when it believes a receiver blank meets the statutory definition of a frame or receiver under the Gun Control Act of 1968. If a receiver blank is believed to be a frame or receiver, it is treated by ATF as a firearm and subjected to certain controls. The following graphic illustrates the features ATF considers preclude a receiver blank from regulation as a frame or receiver:

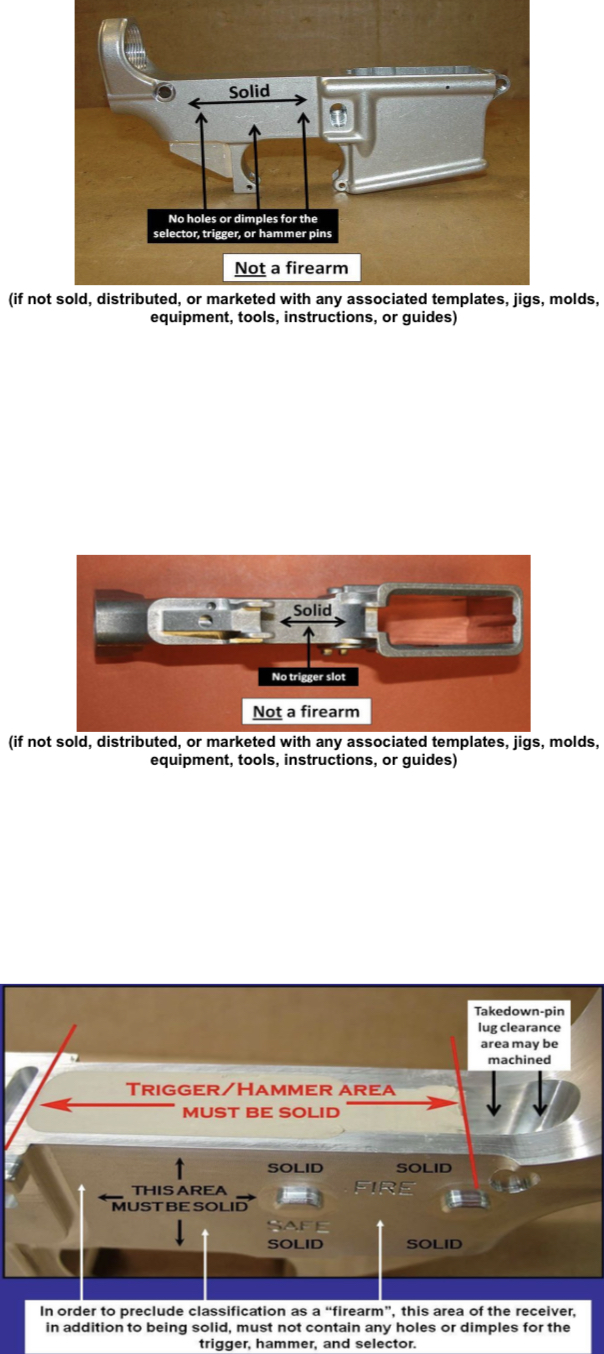
Features of a receiver blank that ATF does not consider as a 'firearm' under the Gun Control Act of 1968

Conversely, a receiver blank with the following features is considered by the agency to be a receiver subject to control as a 'firearm' under the Gun Control Act of 1968:

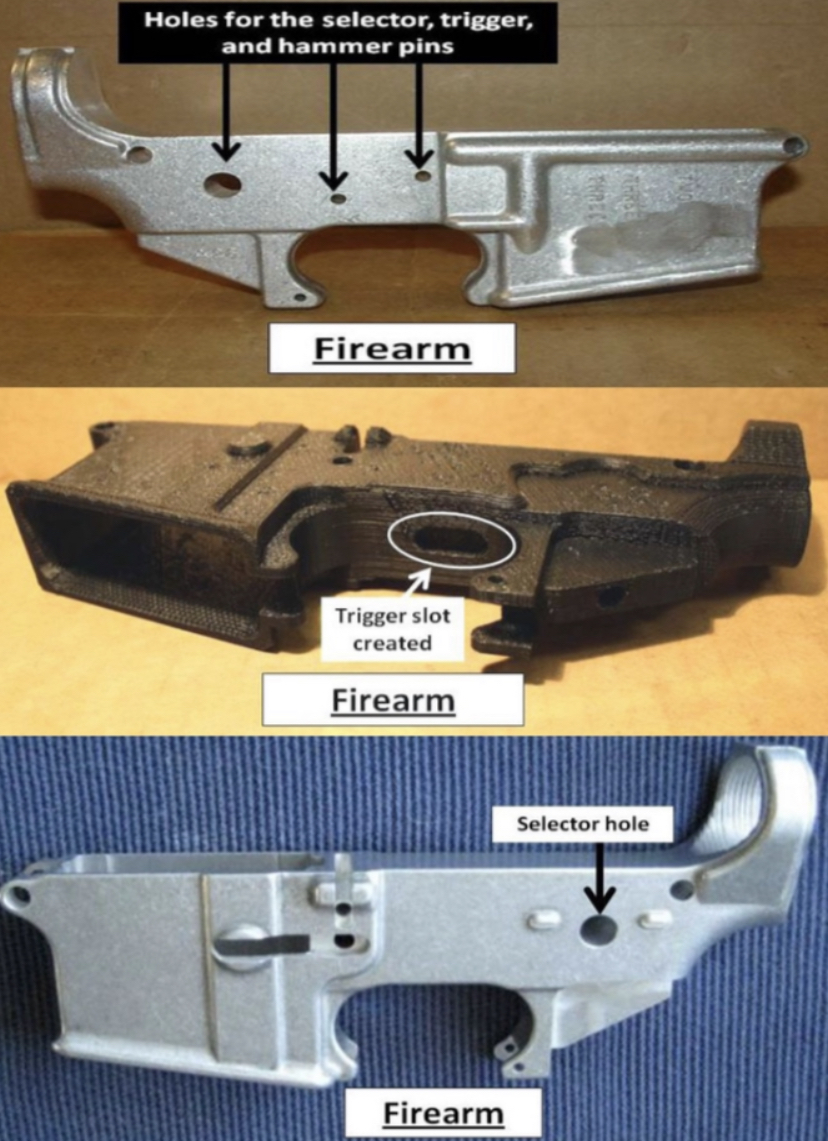
Features of a receiver blank that ATF considers as a 'firearm' under the Gun Control Act of 1968

=== U.S. state laws ===
==== California ====
In 2014, the California Legislature passed a bill to require serial numbers on receiver blanks and all other firearms, including antique guns, but it was vetoed by Governor Jerry Brown. However, in 2016, it passed a measure requiring anyone planning to build a homemade firearm to obtain a serial number from the state (de facto registration) and pass a background check. From July 1, 2024, "firearm precursor parts" may only be sold through a licensed dealer.

==== Colorado ====
On January 4, 2022, Mayor Michael B. Hancock signed into law a bill outlawing certain homemade firearms in Denver, Colorado. The law outlaws the creation, carriage, transportation, discharge, and sale of firearms without serial numbers.

On June 2, 2023, Governor Jared Polis signed Senate Bill 23-279 (Unserialized Firearms And Firearm Components) into law. The law bans the manufacture, possession and sale of unserialized firearms and unserialized frames/receivers, effective January 1, 2024. A violation is made a Class 1 misdemeanor, and a subsequent offense is a Class 5 felony. It also provides regulations requiring existing unserialized firearms to be serialized by a licensed firearms dealer (and for the owners to have background checks) by January 1, 2024.

==== Connecticut ====
Since October 1, 2019, all manufactured guns must have a serial number obtained from the Department of Emergency Services and Public Protection engraved. Any plastic gun that "after removal of grips, stocks and magazines, is not ... detectible" by metal detectors is banned under Connecticut law.

==== Delaware ====
On October 20, 2021, Governor John Carney signed House Bill 125 into law, which "establishes the crimes of possession of an unfinished firearm frame or receiver with no serial number, possession of and manufacturing a covert or undetectable firearm, possession of and manufacturing an untraceable firearm, and manufacturing or distributing a firearm using a three-dimensional printer." The bill effectively prohibits private manufacture of a firearm, by criminalizing possession of an untraceable firearm, including unfinished frames and receivers.

The Delaware law is being challenged in litigation by gun-rights activists, specifically the Firearms Policy Coalition and two individuals. In September 2022, in the case of Rigby v. Jennings, Federal District Court Judge Maryellen Noreika issued a preliminary injunction that barred Delaware from enforcing the portion of the law that restricts the possession and manufacture of untraceable firearms, siding with plaintiffs on their claim that they were likely to succeed on the merits of their Second Amendment claim. However, Noreika denied the plaintiffs' request for an injunction to block the parts of the law that regulate firearm distribution and prohibit distribution of computer code that would facilitate the manufacture of 3D-printed guns.

==== Illinois ====
With the signing of HB4383 in May 2022, building, selling, or possessing homemade firearms without serial numbers is prohibited in Illinois.

==== Maryland ====
In 2022 Maryland governor Larry Hogan allowed legislation that will, according to The Washington Post, "ban the sale, receipt and transfer of unfinished frames or receivers that are not serialized by the manufacturer" to become law without his signature. This law will also outlaw the mere possession of such items starting in March 2023.

==== New Jersey ====
S2465, enacted in November 2018, prohibits the manufacture and sale of guns or parts that are or can become a homemade firearm. Multiple arrests were made within months of this law going into effect. Then State Attorney General Gurbir Grewal aggressively prosecuted infractions of this law. New Jersey filed a lawsuit against U.S. Patriot Armory, a company that allegedly sold AR-15 build kits to New Jersey residents. In July 2019, S3897 was enacted, which criminalizes transferring or possessing unserialized firearms.

==== New York ====
In 2015, during the state of New York's first prosecution for sale of homemade firearms, Then State Attorney General Eric Schneiderman said that it was "easy" for "criminals to make completely untraceable, military-grade firearms." In 2019, New York passed a law to prohibit the making, selling, transporting or possessing 3D-printed guns or other undetectable firearms.

On October 28, 2021, New York Governor Kathy Hochul signed into law restrictions on homemade firearms. This consisted of The Scott J. Beigel Unfinished Receiver Act and The Jose Webster Untraceable Firearms Act.

==== Pennsylvania ====
In December 2019 Josh Shapiro, then Attorney General, issued a legal opinion that 80% lower receivers are considered firearms. After a legal challenge, in January 2020 the Commonwealth Court issued a preliminary injunction blocking AG Shapiro's opinion. A bill passed by the Pennsylvania House of Representatives in 2024 would make it a third-degree felony to sell or transfer firearm parts without serial numbers. The bill has not been passed by the Pennsylvania Senate.

=== Pending legislation ===
==== United States Congress ====
On July 1, 2020, Representatives Jamie Raskin (MD-08) and David Cicilline (RI-01) introduced House Resolution 7468, aiming to outlaw certain conduct in relation to homemade firearms. As of September 22, 2020, the most recent action taken on the bill was on July 1, when it was referred to the House Committee on the Judiciary.

==== Massachusetts ====
As of April 2020, there are at least two bills that aim to control the distribution of firearm kits as well as 3D printed firearms in the Commonwealth: Bill H.3843, "An Act relative to ghost guns", presented by Marjorie C. Decker of 25th Middlesex district, and Bill S.2649, "An Act relative to 3D printed firearm and ghost guns", presented by Michael J. Barrett of 3rd Middlesex district. Both bills have been deferred to the Committee of Ways and Means in the Senate and House, respectively.

==== Illinois ====
On February 7, 2019, Illinois House Rep. Kathleen Willis filed HB2253, entitled the Undetectable and Untraceable Firearms Act, with the Clerk of the House was the Bill was announced to the House. It was then referred to the House Rules Committee for assignment to a substantive committee, and to be formally heard by lawmakers and the public. The Untraceable Firearms Act, for short, proposes to amend the Firearm Owners Identification Card Act primarily by prohibiting the possession, manufacturing, and distribution of "unfinished frames or receivers" without having a FOID (Firearm Owners Identification Card) in his or her possession, among other requirements. HB2253 also proposes to include homemade firearms as a new class of prohibited firearm in certain areas, including public buildings. Violations of HB2253 would result in the commission of a Class 2 felony, punishable by 3 to 7 years in the Illinois Department of Corrections and fines up to $25,000.

The Bill has garnered both support and criticism among lawmakers. In the Bill's introduction, Rep. Willis stated, "I'm not calling for a ban on them, I'm just saying that you need to have the same background checks as you would if you were going to purchase a regular gun..." On the other hand, the Federal Firearms Licensees of Illinois have voiced 2nd Amendment concerns on behalf of gun sellers: "[Rep. Willis is] trying to make it illegal for the home hobbyist to own or possess firearms they've made. They're going after an industry and a hobby and lawful gun owners."

== See also ==
- Improvised firearm
- List of 3D-printed weapons and parts
- Right to keep and bear arms
