= Liberator (gun) =

3D printed firearm design

Liberator .380
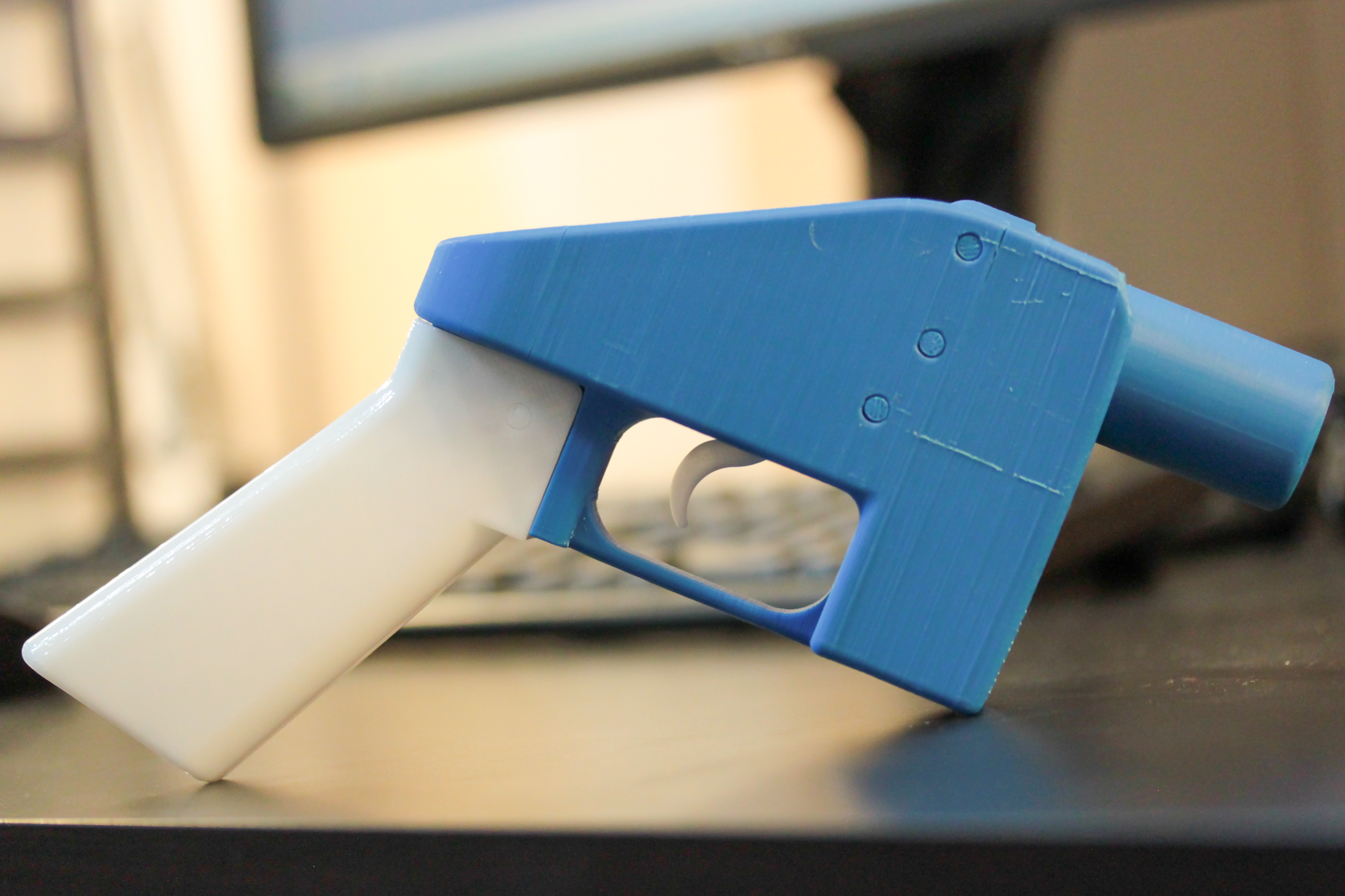
- Type: Single-shot pistol
- Place of origin: United States

Production history
- Designer: Defense Distributed
- Designed: April 2013
- Produced: 2013–present

Specifications
- Length: 216 mm (8.5 in)
- Barrel length: 64 mm (2.5 in)
- Height: 160 mm (6.3 in)
- Cartridge: .380 ACP
- Action: Single-shot

The Liberator is a 3D-printable single-shot handgun, the first such printable firearm design made widely available online.

The open source firm Defense Distributed designed the gun and released the plans on the Internet on May 6, 2013. The plans were downloaded over 100,000 times in the two days before the United States Department of State demanded that Defense Distributed retract the plans.

The plans for the gun remain hosted across the Internet and are available at file sharing websites like The Pirate Bay and GitHub.

On July 19, 2018, the United States Department of Justice reached a settlement with Defense Distributed, allowing the sale of plans for 3D-printed firearms online, beginning August 1, 2018.

On July 31, 2018, President of the United States Donald Trump posted on Twitter about the decision to allow the online publication of the Liberator's files: "I am looking into 3-D Plastic Guns being sold to the public. Already spoke to NRA, doesn’t seem to make much sense!"

On the same day the tweet was posted, a federal judge stopped the release of blueprints to make the Liberator due to it being an untraceable and undetectable 3D-printed plastic gun, citing safety concerns.

On April 27, 2021, the United States Court of Appeals for the Ninth Circuit vacated the injunction and ordered the district court to dismiss the case, holding that Congress had expressly prohibited judicial review of the agency decisions in question. President Joe Biden announced in early April that the Justice Department would issue new rules for "ghost guns" within 30 days.

== Namesake and concept ==
The 3D-printable Liberator is named after the FP-45 Liberator, a single-shot pistol designed by George Hyde and mass-produced by the Inland Manufacturing Division of the General Motors Corporation for the United States Office of Strategic Services (OSS) in World War II; the OSS intended to air drop the gun into occupied Europe for resistance forces to use. The FP-45 Liberator was not designed to be effective on a battlefield or for prolonged firefights; it was produced to enable its operator to acquire another weapon with superior technical characteristics – the intended method of use being to sneak up on an enemy soldier, shoot him at close range, and then take his service firearm. A project of the OSS (which would later become the CIA), it is thought the FP-45 Liberator was equally purposed as a tool of psychological warfare. Occupying forces in Europe would have to weigh evidence of distributed pistols as a factor in planning against civilian resistance, which would complicate their strategy and affect morale. However, though used in France, there is little evidence that the pistols were ever dropped into occupied Europe in large quantities.

The physible Liberator's release to the Internet can be understood as Defense Distributed's attempt to more successfully execute the historical psychological operation, and as a symbolic act supporting resistance to world governments.

== Withdrawal of plans and The Pirate Bay hosting ==
Days after their publication, the United States Department of State's Office of Defense Trade Controls issued a letter to Defense Distributed demanding that it retract the Liberator plans from public availability. The State Department justified this demand by asserting the right to regulate the flow of technical data related to arms, and its role in enforcing the Arms Export Control Act of 1976.

However, soon thereafter the design appeared on The Pirate Bay (TPB), which publicly stated its defense of the information. Quoted on TorrentFreak: "TPB has for close to 10 years been operating without taking down one single torrent due to pressure from the outside. And it will never start doing that."

The site would go on to issue a statement on its Facebook page:

So apparently there are some 3D prints of guns in the physibles section at TPB. Prints that the US government now claim ownership of. Our position is, as always, to not delete any torrents as long as its contents are as stated in the torrents description. Printable guns [are] a very serious matter that will be up for debate for a long time from now. We don't condone gun violence. We believe that the world needs less guns, not more of them. We believe however that these prints will stay on the internets regardless of blocks and censorship, since that's how the internets works. If there's a lunatic out there who wants to print guns to kill people, he or she will do it. With or without TPB. Better to have these prints out in the open internets (TPB) and up for peer review (the comment threads), than semi hidden in the darker parts of the internet.

— The Pirate Bay, May 10, 2013

== Reception ==
Original copies of the Liberator have been permanently acquired by the Victoria and Albert Museum, and a copy of the gun is on display at London's Science Museum.

Writing in The Register, Lewis Page ridiculed the Liberator, stating "it isn't any more a gun than any other very short piece of plastic pipe is a "gun"", and comparing it with a 1950s zip gun.

== Usage history ==
In May 2013, Finnish Yle TV2 current affairs programme Ajankohtainen kakkonen produced a Liberator handgun under the supervision of a licensed gunsmith and fired it under controlled conditions. During the experiment, the weapon shattered. It was later found that an error was made concerning the settings of the 3D printer. Printed under the right conditions, the Liberator gun has a lifespan of 8–10 shots.

Israeli Channel 10 reporters built and tested a Liberator with a 9 mm cartridge, successfully hitting a target at a distance of several meters. On June 24, 2013, the reporters smuggled the gun (without barrel and ammunition) into the Israeli house of parliament, coming within a short distance of Israeli PM Benjamin Netanyahu.

A Japanese man, Yoshitomo Imura, printed and assembled five copies of the Liberator, and on or about April 12, 2014, he uploaded video evidence of his possession of the weapons to the internet. Authorities arrested him on May 8, 2014, and found that at least two of the copies possessed lethal power. Cody Wilson, a founder of Defense Distributed, stated on the incident that the man "performed his work in the open, without suspicion, fear or dishonor". In October 2014 Imura was sentenced to 2 years in jail. Guinness World Records record Imura as the first person to receive a jail sentence for 3D printing.

== See also ==
- 3D-printed firearm
- Code as speech
- FGC-9
- FP-45 Liberator
- Improvised firearm
- List of notable 3D printed weapons and parts
