= Parts kit =

Collection of weapon parts designed to, or be readily assembled into a firearm

A parts kit is a collection of weapon (notably firearm) parts that, according to the Bureau of Alcohol, Tobacco, Firearms, and Explosives (ATF), "is designed to or may be readily be assembled, completed, converted, or restored to expel a projectile by the action of an explosive." As an example, the kit may not include a receiver or include an incomplete receiver. Under current U.S. law, kits that include finished receivers must be serialized and their buyers must receive a background check, but kits that include "unfinished" receivers are totally unregulated for purchase.

== Receivers ==
US parts kit regulation is distinct from that of other countries (except Canada where the receiver is also the regulated part), where a firearm's pressure bearing parts such as bolts, barrels, and gas pistons are the commonly regulated components. In the United States a serialized receiver can be purchased or manufactured from a state of incompleteness to create a firearm. The National Firearms Act (NFA) restricts the possession of automatic firearms, so most parts kits end up used with a semi-automatic receiver. In addition, under US gun law, a receiver that is legally a machine gun cannot legally become semi-automatic. There is no federal restriction on the purchase and import of machine gun parts kits (minus the barrel), however.

Parts kits are available for many firearms including the AR-15 and AKM variants.
