= Defense Distributed v. Blanche =

2026 U.S. district court case

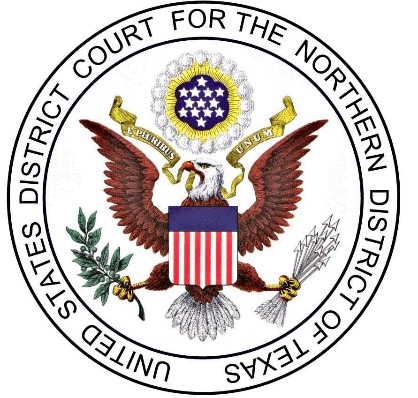
- Court: United States District Court for the Northern District of Texas
- Full case name: Defense Distributed, et al. v. Todd Wallace Blanche, et al.
- Decided: August 17, 2026
- Docket nos.: 4:22-cv-00691-O
- Citation: Opinion and Order (N.D. Tex. August 17, 2026)

Holding
- ATF Frame or Receiver Rule held unconstitutional under the Second Amendment and void for vagueness under the Fifth Amendment; permanent injunction granted for the plaintiffs.

Court membership
- Judge sitting: Reed O'Connor

Defense Distributed v. Blanche is a 2026 decision of the United States District Court for the Northern District of Texas of national significance. The court held that provisions of ATF’s 2022 Frame or Receiver Final Rule violated the Second Amendment of the U.S. Constitution as applied to Defense Distributed and the Second Amendment Foundation.

== Background ==
In April 2022, the federal Bureau of Alcohol Tobacco and Firearms (ATF) issued an APA Final Rule changing the Gun Control Act's definition of "frame or receiver" to regulate partial and incomplete frames. The agency added expansive new criteria to the definition that included the term "readily convertible."

The case began in August 2022 as VanDerStok v. Garland, a challenge to the ATF Final Rule under the Administrative Procedure Act, which Defense Distributed and the Second Amendment Foundation joined that year as intervenor plaintiffs. The district court found the rule unlawful under the APA, which the Fifth Circuit largely upheld, but the Supreme Court ultimately reversed in Bondi v. VanDerStok (2025). While the Court found the ATF had not exceeded its statutory authority in reinterpreting the Gun Control Act, it did not reach the Second Amendment or "void for vagueness" questions.

On remand to the Texas District court, the original plaintiffs and the other intervenors dropped their claims, which left Defense Distributed and the Second Amendment Foundation as the only remaining parties to press the outstanding constitutional claims. The parties moved for summary judgment in April 2026.

== District court decision ==
Chief Judge Reed O'Connor of the United States District Court for the Northern District of Texas granted the plaintiffs' motion for summary judgement on constitutional claims under the Second Amendment (being inconsistent with the Bruen framework), and void for vagueness doctrine under the Fifth Amendment, and granted permanent injunctive relief.

The decision legalized the nationwide sale of a small number of Defense Distributed's products, including so-called "G80 kits."
