= Urutau (firearm) =

3D-printable firearm

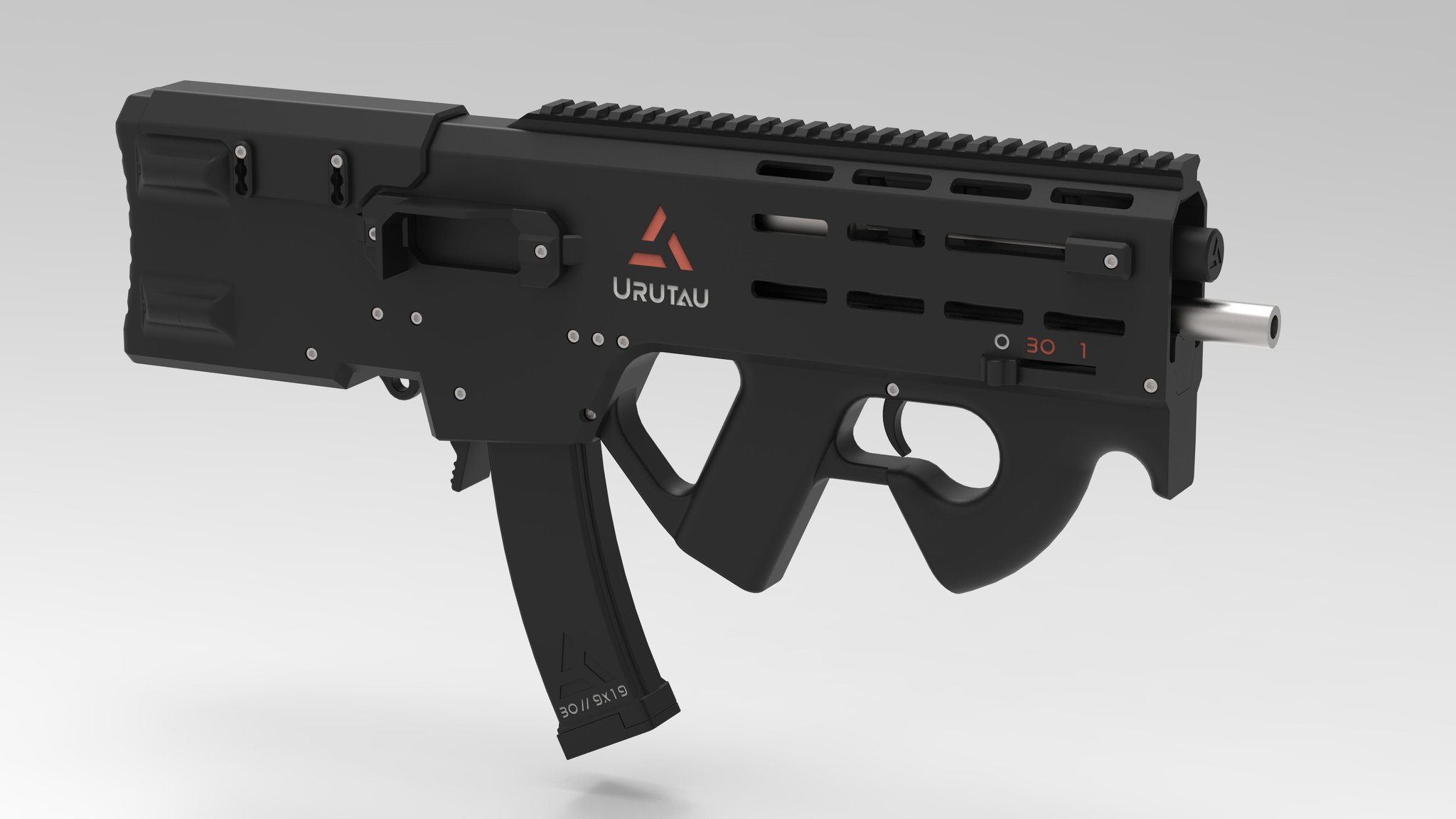
- Type: Bullpup short-barreled rifle
- Place of origin: Brazil

Production history
- Designer: Zé Carioca of Deterrence Dispensed
- Designed: 2021–2024
- Produced: 2024–present

Specifications
- Mass: 2,380 g (5 lb 4.0 oz) with empty magazine
- Length: 475 mm (18.7 in) to 660.4 mm (26.0 in)
- Barrel length: 250 mm (9.8 in) to 406.4 mm (16.0 in)
- Cartridge: 9×19mm
- Action: blowback, closed bolt
- Feed system: CZ Scorpion Evo 3 magazine or custom 3D printed magazine
- Sights: Iron Sights, Picatinny rail available for optics
- References: Urutau and Manual on Odysee

The Urutau is a 3D-printable, semi-automatic, bullpup, pistol-caliber carbine. The firearm was designed and manufactured between 2021 and 2024 by a Brazilian gun designer known by the pseudonyms "Joseph The Parrot" and "Zé Carioca."

== Etymology ==
The gun's name is a reference to the common potoo, also known as "The Ghost Bird."

== Origin ==
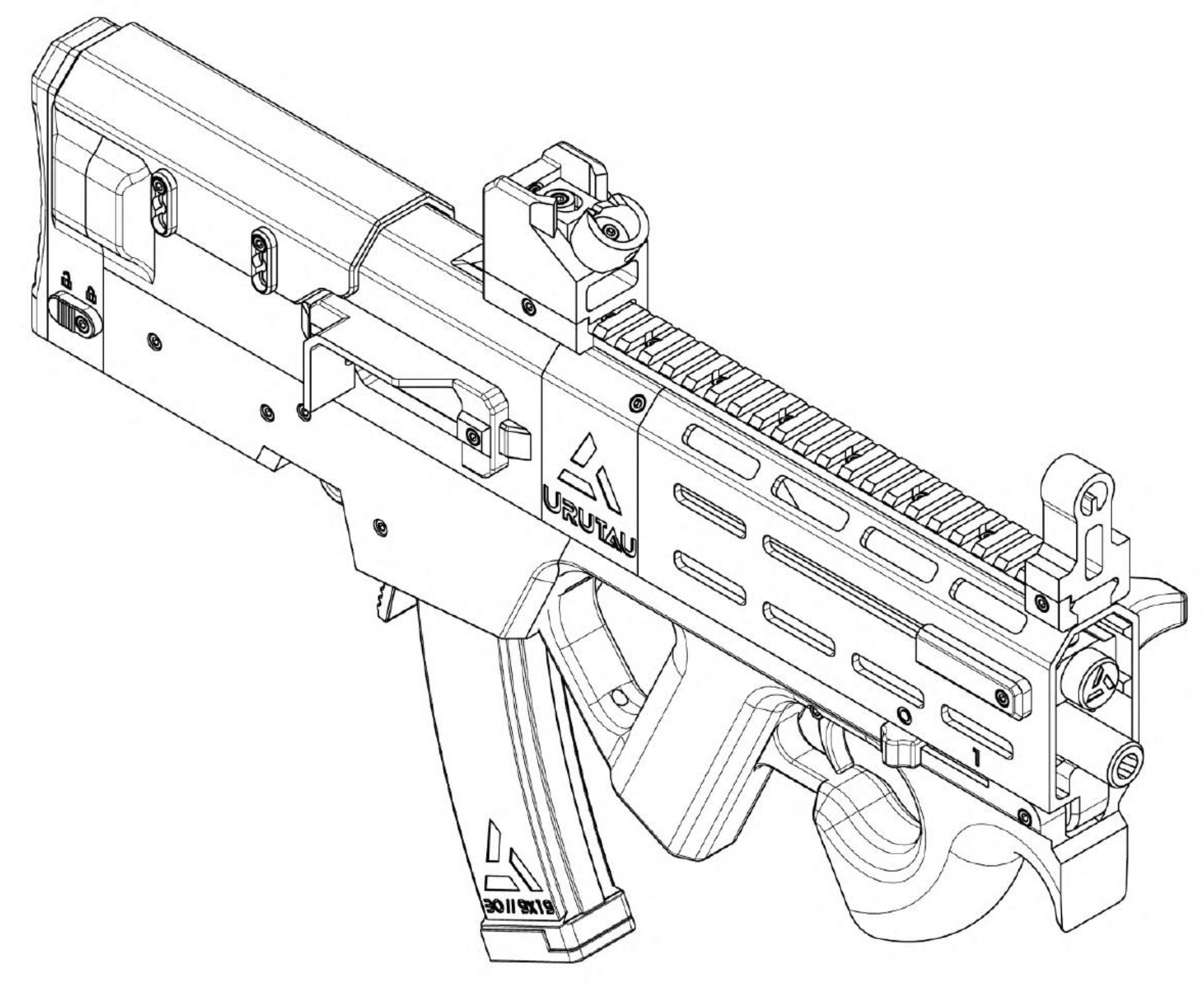
The drawing of the Urutau

The Urutau was originally designed between 2021 and 2024 by Zé Carioca, a pseudonymous Brazilian gun designer. The design was beta tested on the platforms of Deterrence Dispensed (also known as The Gatalog) and Are We Cool Yet? (AWCY), but at one point since the beta chatroom on AWCY? was inactive, Zé Carioca asked people there to move to the Gatalog chat room. AWCY distanced itself from the project a few weeks before its release due to unspecified reasons. The Urutau file package was published on August 20, 2024, under a CC0 1.0 Universal license. The Urutau was entirely tested by remote testers across multiple continents. Zé Carioca didn't personally test the gun during the design process.

== Design ==
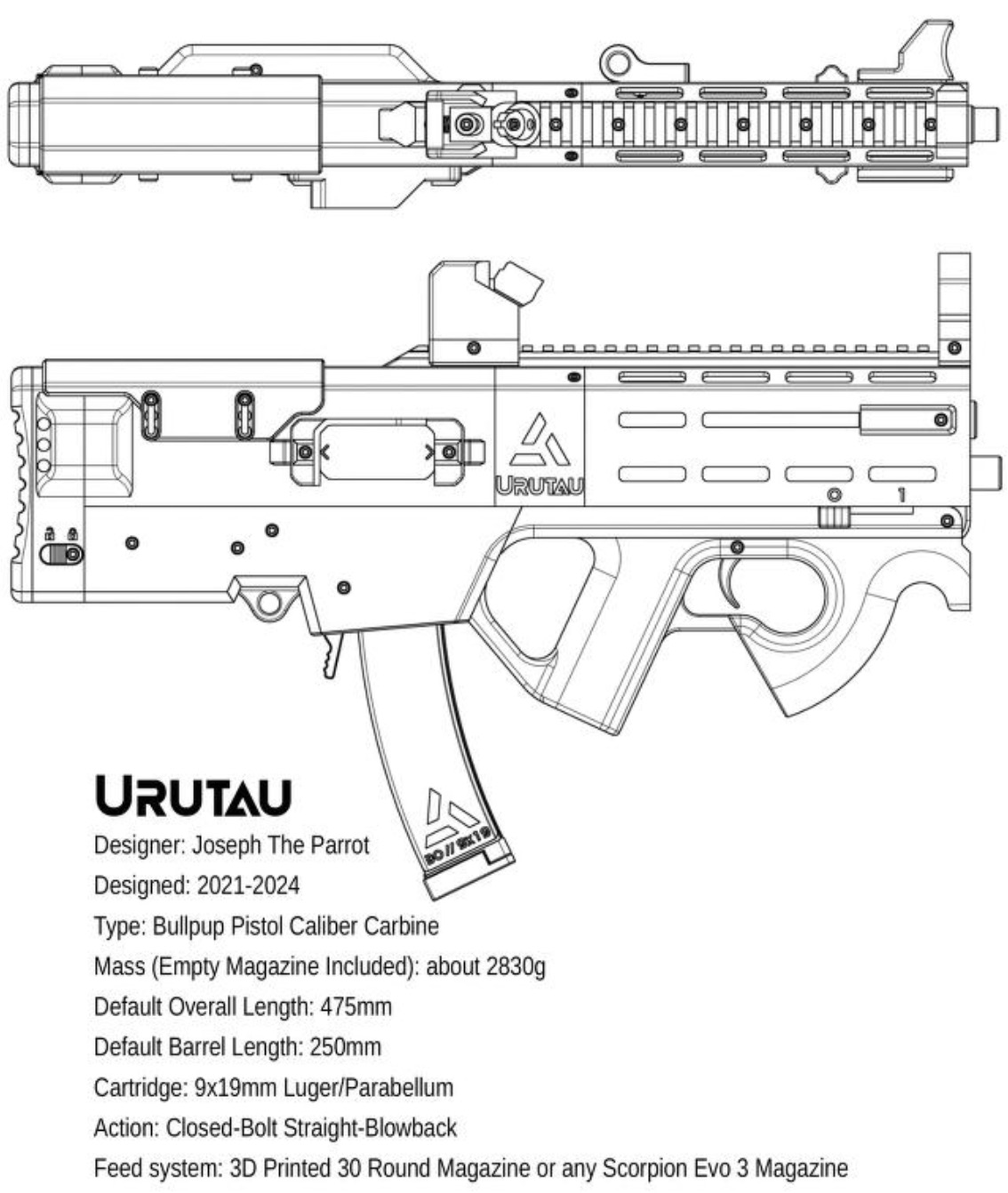
The Technical Specfications and drawing of The Urutau

The design of the Urutau is inspired by previously published 3D-printable firearm designs, the Derwood Shuty, the FGC-9 by JStark1809, and the Partisan 9 by ImmortalRevolt. While most of the underlying mechanics of The Urutau are comparable to the FGC-9, all parts were significantly redesigned. Compared to these designs, the Urutau sought to improve the ease of manufacture, invulnerability to state intervention, and competitiveness with modern standards. It achieves this by optimizing the ballistic efficiency of the 9x19mm Luger cartridge, eliminating the need to access and utilize welding equipment, minimizing dependence on firearm-associated components, minimizing steel drilling, minimizing felt recoil, enhancing the reliability of the fire control group, utilizing magazines comparable to the CZ Scorpion Evo 3's, enhancing mechanical safety and out-of-battery resistance, and enhancing the intuitive use of the design. As the Urutau is a bullpup, its minimum overall length is similar to if not an improvement to its predecessors. The design primarily uses metric units for fasteners and other hardware, but variants of the design based on the imperial system also exist. The magazine is 3D-printable, and the entire design works without needing any commonly regulated, commercial gun parts. The bolt carrier assembly, a stress-bearing component, is manufactured from a 30cm or 1ft of 12mm X 20mm or 1/2” X 3/4” steel bar stock and processed by sawing, drilling, filing, cleaning, tapping, and using M6 Screw to secure the steel parts to a plastic housing. The Urutau's barrel, another stress-bearing component, can be completed in several ways, but the recommended method involves electrochemical machining conducted on a piece of 16mm OD 8mm ID Steel Hydraulic Pipe. With the exception of fasteners, pins, springs, and other widely available metal hardware, the rest of the Urutau is 3D-printed.

=== Modifications ===
The Urutau file package contains multiple alternative design approaches which include:

- A bolt carrier assembly which uses an M8 screw to secure the metal components to the plastic instead of using adhesives. This modification is intended to optionally enhance the ease of disassembly at the expense of a little more work up front.
  - This modification was made standard in the v1.1 update to the Urutau, however it uses an M6 screw instead of an M8 screw. With the update, adhesives are no longer recommended to complete the bolt carrier assembly.
- A firing pin made from a long M4 screw as an alternative to a screwdriver shaft. This modification is intended to enhance supply chain resilience and minimize the risk of correlation attacks. This modification requires access to a small lathe.
- A lower receiver, barrel cover, and trigger which use stainless steel pins and heatset threaded inserts as an alternative to threaded spacers. This modification is intended to enhance supply chain resilience and minimize the risk of correlation attacks.
- A safety switch designed to use magnets instead of plastic detents.
- Parts to optimize the design for left-handed shooters.
- A cutaway upper receiver for diagnostic purposes. (Firing the gun with a cutaway upper receiver is possible but dangerous and not recommended.)

Given the open-source nature and CC0 1.0 Universal license applied to the Urutau, many modifications to the original design have appeared online. Some of these modifications include modified grips and barrel covers.

A video trailer published before the Urutau's publication date teased at the design being select-fire or fully automatic. This feature was not included in the version 1.0 release with it being semi-automatic only. The designer, Zé Carioca, explained that this was for a number of reasons. First, he noted that the select-fire design was unreliable given an issue with bolt-bounce and auto sear timing. Second, he noted that they were unable to test the select-fire design to Deterrence Dispensed standards. Lastly, he noted that the documentation's author, RSmith28, refused to write documentation for a select-fire design due to International Traffic in Arms Regulations (ITAR) concerns. As of the Urutau's publication, technical data for non-automatic and semi-automatic firearms were removed from the United States Munitions List (USML), the list of items controlled under ITAR, but fully automatic firearms and conversion devices thereof had not. On June 12, 2025, Zé Carioca announced that "No more blown primers or bolt bounce! All issues with the select-fire version [of the Urutau] are resolved, with release expected in 60-90 days." The announcement included a video of an Urutau firing in full auto without any issues.

== Documentation ==
The Urutau file package contained a collective total of about 200 pages of documentation, including instructions and other auxiliary documents. These documents were authored and illustrated by RSmith28, an affiliate of Deterrence Dispensed. The primary document is 114 pages long and provides the assembly instructions, material and tool requirements, safety and legal precautions, testing and troubleshooting advice, and an explanation of the Urutau's design choices.

The Urutau's documentation is the first notable 3D-printed firearm to include advice for avoiding detection by law enforcement, as detailed in the OpSec & Obfuscation Section. West Midlands Police and the BBC’s show “Forensics: The Real CSI- Untraceable Firearms” are credited for inspiring or confirming the contents of the OpSec & Obfuscation Section by the authors. Its advice includes understanding the importance of secrecy, managing physical evidence, managing digital evidence, secure communication practices, avoiding or evading know your customer requirements on retail websites, and finding activities to act as a cover for manufacturing a firearm.

=== Extended Length ECM Barrels ===
In the "ECM Barrel" directory of the Urutau's file package, a 67-page document titled "Extended Length ECM Barrels" is available. It is a comprehensive instruction manual to create a 9x19mm Luger barrel with a piece of 16mm OD 8mm ID Steel Hydraulic Pipe and electrochemical machining (ECM). The guide contains contextual information, instructions on basic toolmaking, the electrochemical machining process itself, and post-processing.

=== John Smith Practices Good OpSec! ===
In the "Mods & Extras" directory of the Urutau's file package, a seven-page document titled, "John Smith Practices Good OpSec!" is available. It is referenced at the end of the OpSec & Obfuscation section of the Urutau's documentation as "a general example of purchasing and shipping a product without leaving a digital paper trail."

This document is formatted like a story book, with AI-generated illustrations. It tells a fictitious story of a man named John Smith who desired to build an Urutau in an area where gun laws were prohibitive. To acquire the materials for the Urutau while avoiding surveillance, he purchases a eBay gift card with physical currency from a local convenience store. He then places the order from a publicly-available computer and ships the goods to an apartment building with an unlocked mailroom and no surveillance cameras. After acquiring the goods, he builds his Urutau and the story concludes.

=== Alternative Design Choices ===
The Urutau file package includes a directory titled "Mods & Extras" which includes alternative options for building the Urutau. Each modification includes a PDF or TXT file explaining how to utilize it. The directory also includes a standalone copy of OpSec & Obfuscation and a Spanish translation of The New Second Amendment.

=== Creating Documentation ===
In the "Mods & Extras" directory of the Urutau's file package, a 20 page document titled, "Creating Documentation" is available. This document instructs the reader through the process of creating documentation in the style of the Urutau. Some sections provide generic advice while others provide linear tutorials. The required software includes LibreOffice Writer, Adobe Illustrator, and Autodesk Inventor.

== Availability ==
The Urutau file package was originally published on Odysee, an open source blockchain based video, audio and file hosting site using the LBRY protocol. Zé Carioca asked the Odysee user PLA.Boi to host the files initially as there was a delay in getting Deterrence Dispensed to publish the files. After a few days, Deterrence Dispensed started hosting the files under their Hybrid Designs Odysee page. While this is the official place The Urutau is hosted, it is available from other Odysee users and other parts of the internet. The files are also available on DEFCAD, though unlike on Odysee, they are locked behind a paywall.

== Users and use ==
- Complete and incomplete models have been recovered by police forces in Auckland, New Zealand, Blackheath, New South Wales, Australia, Lexington Park, Maryland, United States of America, and Rio de Janeiro, Brazil.
- At the Australian Federal Police forensics headquarters in Canberra, the ballistics team manufactured their own Urutau.
- In March 25, 2025, a report published by The Jamestown Foundation found that "In August, a pro-Islamic State (IS) supporter posted design manuals for the 'Urutau,' a 3D-printed 9mm, semi-automatic rifle, on a popular IS messaging platform."

== See also ==
- List of 3D-printed weapons and parts
- Code as speech
- Homemade firearm
