= Blue Hampshire =

- Website type: Blog
- Website: bluehampshire.com
- Launched: 2006

Blue Hampshire is a liberal American political weblog based in the state of New Hampshire. It features community discussion of local, state, and national political issues, coordination of fund raising and activism, and news, announcements, and opinions from Democratic party officials, candidates, and elected office holders.

Blue Hampshire was founded in 2006 by bloggers Dean Barker, Michael Caulfield, and Laura Clawson. In 2007 an article in The Wall Street Journal described the site as "a Democratic blog that has quickly become an influential voice in the New Hampshire primary campaign."

Kevin H. Smith, former New Hampshire legislator, executive director of the conservative group Cornerstone Policy Research, and Republican candidate for governor, characterized Blue Hampshire as "a very effective site for those people on the left who want to exchange ideas and really get active."

On several occasions various interests have attempted to influence opinion by covertly posting to the site. In 2007 staffers from the Hillary Clinton presidential campaign were found to have pseudonymously created accounts. In 2011 an employee of the Republican Office at the New Hampshire State House posed as a Democrat.

In 2009 former New Hampshire Republican State Committee political director Tom DeRosa founded RedHampshire, an attempt to replicate Blue Hampshire's success in a conservative site. RedHampshire shut down in 2011.
