= FGC-9 =

3D-printable firearm

- Type: Semiautomatic carbine
- Place of origin: Germany

Service history
- Used by: People's Defence Force
- Wars: Myanmar civil war (2021–present) Brazilian drug war

Production history
- Designer: Jacob Duygu (JStark1809) of Deterrence Dispensed
- Designed: 2018–2020
- Produced: 2019–present
- Variants: see variants

Specifications
- Mass: 2.1 kg (4 lb 10.1 oz) without magazine
- Length: 520 mm (20.5 in)
- Barrel length: 114 mm (4.5 in)
- Cartridge: 9×19mm
- Action: Closed bolt blowback action
- Feed system: Glock magazine, including custom extended variants
- Sights: Picatinny rail

The FGC-9 is a physible, 3D-printable semi-automatic pistol caliber carbine, first released in early 2020. Based on the Shuty AP-9 by Derwood, the FGC-9 was designed and first manufactured by the German-Kurdish gun designer Jacob Duygu, under the pseudonym JStark1809.

The gun was designed to not require any potentially regulated firearm parts (under European Union laws) in order to enable people in countries with restrictive gun control laws to manufacture it with little or no legal trouble. The weapon is a mix of fabricated 3D printed parts, easily manufactured metal pressure-bearing parts, and readily available springs, screws, nuts and bolts. The total cost of production, assuming the user already owns a 3D printer, is less than US$500.

The FGC-9 release was accompanied by thorough documentation to aid construction and assembly. The documentation has been translated into several other languages since it was first published. In April 2021, the MkII revision was released, with several updates designed to make the building process simpler. The files for the firearm's manufacture are available across the internet.

== Etymology ==
The gun's name is an initialism for "Fuck Gun Control", with the "9" referencing its 9mm cartridge.

== Origin ==
The FGC-9 was originally designed and manufactured between 2018 and 2020 by JStark1809, a pseudonymous German-Kurdish gun designer, with contributions from the "guerrilla 3D-gun file development group" Deterrence Dispensed, and was released on 27 March 2020 by Deterrence Dispensed and JStark1809. The core mechanical design elements are based on an earlier 3D printable design, the Shuty AP-9 pistol by Derwood, with a multitude of mechanical, ergonomic and constructive changes and improvements having been done to the AP-9 foundation. The "Shuty" relies on several factory-made or extensively machined gun parts (like the barrel) in order to be completed. This poses a challenge to would-be builders in jurisdictions that regulate and restrict such components or those without access to a machining workshop. The gun is also influenced by Philip Luty's SMG designs.

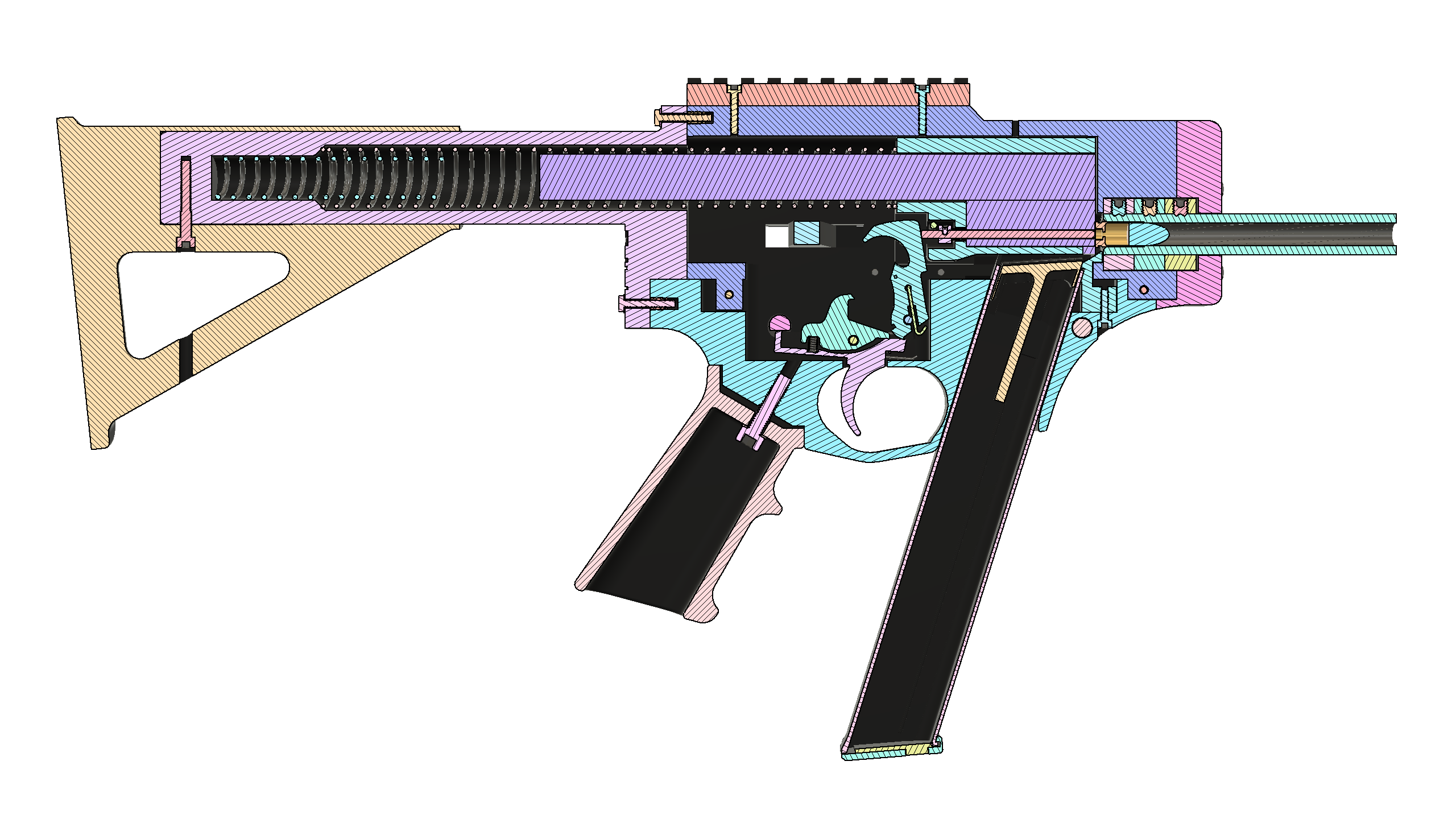
Cross section of the FGC-9 MkI model.

The FGC-9 eliminates the need for factory-made gun parts or reliance on the advanced fabrication skills of the maker. The FGC-9 is designed with Europeans in mind; fasteners and build materials use the metric standard and are available from hardware stores. The magazine can be 3D printed, and the entire design works without needing any regulated, commercial gun parts. The FGC-9's barrel can be completed in several ways, including the easily adopted method of electrochemical machining.

=== Mark II ===
An extensively updated design, the MkII was first announced on 23 October 2020 by En Bloc Press. Designer JStark1809 produced the MkII with help from designers "3socksandcrocs" and "Ivan the Troll". It was released on April 16, 2021 on DEFCAD and Odysee by user "The Gatalog". The updated weapon uses a H&K MP5 style charging handle, an improved electro-chemical machining process to make the barrel, and some ergonomic improvements as well. The release was the final package in a string of multiple smaller releases, which included the improved barrel ECMv2.0 process, and the Menendez Mag v2.0, and the Common Sense Fire Control Group AR-15 printable trigger, all created by Ivan The Troll in preparation for the FGC-9 MkII release.

=== Modifications ===
Due to the open-source nature of the FGC-9, there have been many packages released that alter the configuration, caliber, ergonomics, and other legally-restrictive qualities of the base-model firearm. These are all available through a wide variety of channels, all with different levels of testing, and allow the end user to customize their weapon as needed. One very common branch is replacing the buttstock with an ATF-approved pistol brace, in order for U.S. citizens to comply with NFA rifle and pistol requirements. Another common branch is replacing the barrel with a 16-inch (41 cm) barrel in order to comply with U.S. minimum barrel length requirements, in addition to adding an extended handguard to replace the default one. The firearms hobbyist and instructor QueerArmorer created a version of the top rail for use in Myanmar by rebels fighting with limited access to optics in the Myanmar civil war, however its use was limited as another team from Deterrence Dispensed developed printable iron sights that allowed for more flexibility.

=== Variants ===
Model	Image	Date made public	Designer
FGC-9 MkII		April 16, 2021	JStark1809 / Deterrence Dispensed
FGC-9 MkII		Updated design with an H&K MP5 style charging handle.; Released to work with a string of smaller releases, including an improved barrel making process and V2 Menendez Mag. Includes the "ButWhatAboutAmmo" tutorial for fabricating ammunition.	
FGC-9 MKII Stingray		June 2022	hotsauce
FGC-9 MKII Stingray		A DIY 16-inch (41 cm) barreled carbine based on the FGC-9.; In use by the People's Defense Force in Myanmar.	
Partisan-9		September 2022	Deterrence Dispensed / The Gatalog
Partisan-9		Based on the FGC-9 MkII.; Has a ported barrel for integral suppression, similar to the MP5SD. Uses an improved ECM process to create the barrel.; Features a folding stock and buffer tube.	
FGC-9 MKII Bufferless	–	Bufferless version with the bolt placed mostly forward similar to Mussys WTF-9.	
FMGC-01	–	Bufferless select fire variant that uses Sten magazines instead of Glocks.	
Nutty-9		July 14, 2024	DetDisp, The Gatalog, Black Lotus Coalition, TooAceForThisShit
Nutty-9		Bolt is made from standardized mechanical bolts, which eliminates the requirement for welding.; Comes in metric and imperial standards.; Can use a Glock barrel or a custom made barrel like the original FGC-9.	
FGC-6	–	Airsoft replica of the FGC-9 in scale 1:1.	

== Materials ==
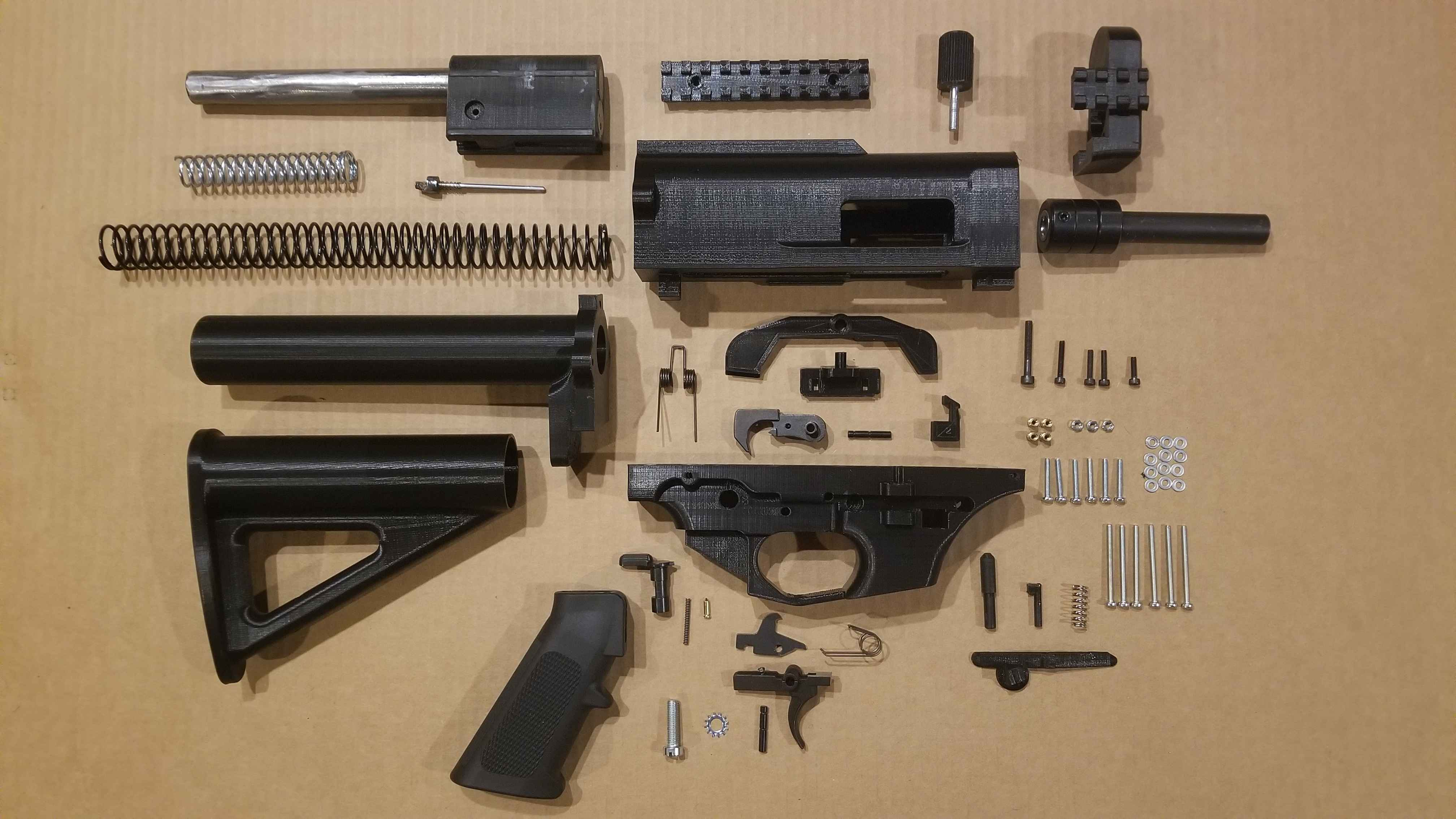
Disassembled components of the FGC-9 MkI model.

The upper and lower receivers of the FGC-9 are fully 3D-printed, as are its pistol grip and stock. Its magazine, based on the Glock magazine design, may also be printed. For the MkI, an AR-15 or modified airsoft trigger system is needed for the fire control. In the MkII release, the developers released a package to 3D-print the AR-15 trigger. The barrel can be rifled polygonally through electrochemical machining. Some designers have estimated the tooling to complete the FGC-9, including the price of the printer (~$200) and electrochemical machining equipment (~$100), at $500. JStark1809 himself estimated the project to take 1.5 to 2 weeks to build.

== Availability ==
The gun's 3D-printing files were released under an open-source license on DEFCAD by JStark1809, and then uploaded to various hosting platforms by Deterrence Dispensed such as Odysee, a free-speech blockchain based video, audio and file hosting site using the LBRY protocol.

According to Rajan Basra, a professor at International Centre for the Study of Radicalisation at King's College London, the FGC is particularly popular among far-right groups due to the sharing of its instructions in extremist internet forums.

== Investigations ==
Test firing of an FGC-9 MkI model.

Jake Hanrahan of Popular Front interviewed JStark1809 about the FGC-9 and 3D printed guns in November 2020. JStark1809 stated that he had no background in engineering, taught himself CAD, and learned what he needed through widely-available resources on the internet. With his rudimentary operation, he showed how to manufacture an FGC-9 in two weeks or less. He shot the gun in a forest and demonstrated its reliability and rapid firing rate. JStark1809 described his absolutist belief in the right to keep and make arms, as well as his desire to make the weapons widely available in order to protect human rights. Hanrahan described him as "one of the most dangerous people" he had ever met and criticized authorities for underestimating the power of 3D-printed guns.

Der Spiegel reported in October 2021 that British financial services had provided clues on the identity of JStark1809 to the Federal Criminal Police Office, and they identified a 28-year-old man in Völklingen who went by "Jacob D." Police had raided his home that June, though they found no weapons and did not take him into custody. Two days after the raid, he was found dead in his car in front of his parents' home in Hannover. Coroners determined the cause of death to be a heart attack and ruled out foul play.

In October 2023, a report published by the International Centre for the Study of Radicalisation and Political Violence named JStark1809 as Jacob Duygu, a German national born to Kurdish parents who arrived as refugees from Southeast Turkey in the 1990s. The report claims he is the author of hundreds of anonymous internet posts, but does so using statistical inference from language patterns rather than direct evidence. In these posts he is said to have posted xenophobic, racist, antisemitic, and misogynistic comments, as well as endorse anti-State violence. The report further claims he described his life as an incel and spoke of his desire to travel to Southeast Asia or commit suicide.

== Users and use ==
Video of Mi Tala Nyan, the commander of Mon State Revolutionary Force, firing an FGC-9.

- Myanmar: MkII and MkII Stingray variant used by rebel forces in the Myanmar civil war (2021–present).
- Complete and incomplete models have been recovered by police forces in the European Union, United Kingdom, Australia, New Zealand, Canada, the United States, Taiwan, Iceland, And Brazil.
- Dissident republican paramilitaries: MkII variant seen in the hands of a member of the dissident Irish republican paramilitary Óglaigh na hÉireann during a parade in Easter 2022.
- A Finnish man was sentenced to prison for one year and four months because he manufactured at least 8 guns. Also in Finland, three men were convicted in relation to the production of 3D-printed weapons.

== See also ==
- Code as speech
- Liberator (gun)
- List of notable 3D printed weapons and parts
- Privately made firearm
