= 2022 United States Senate election in New Hampshire =

- November 8, 2022
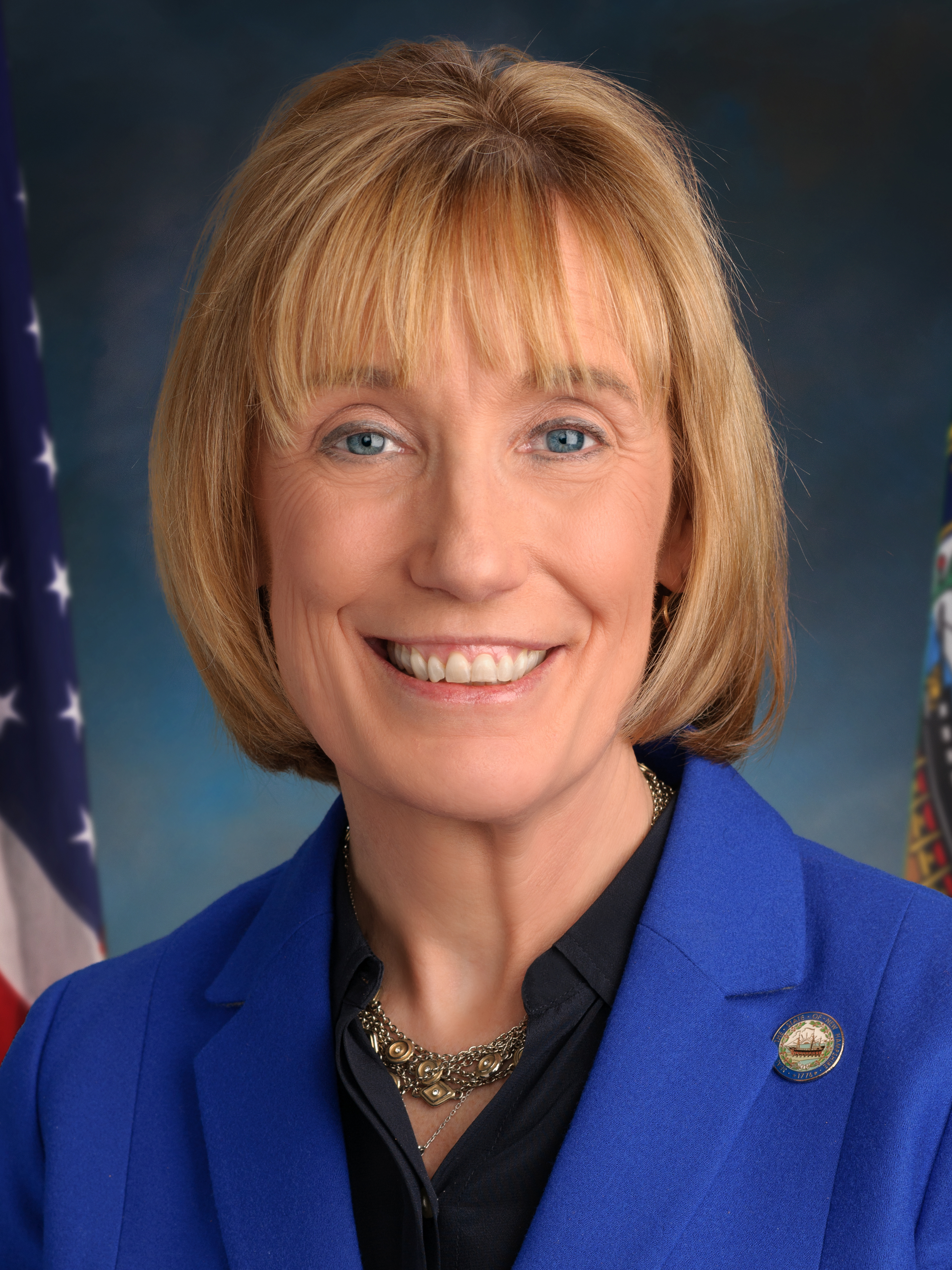

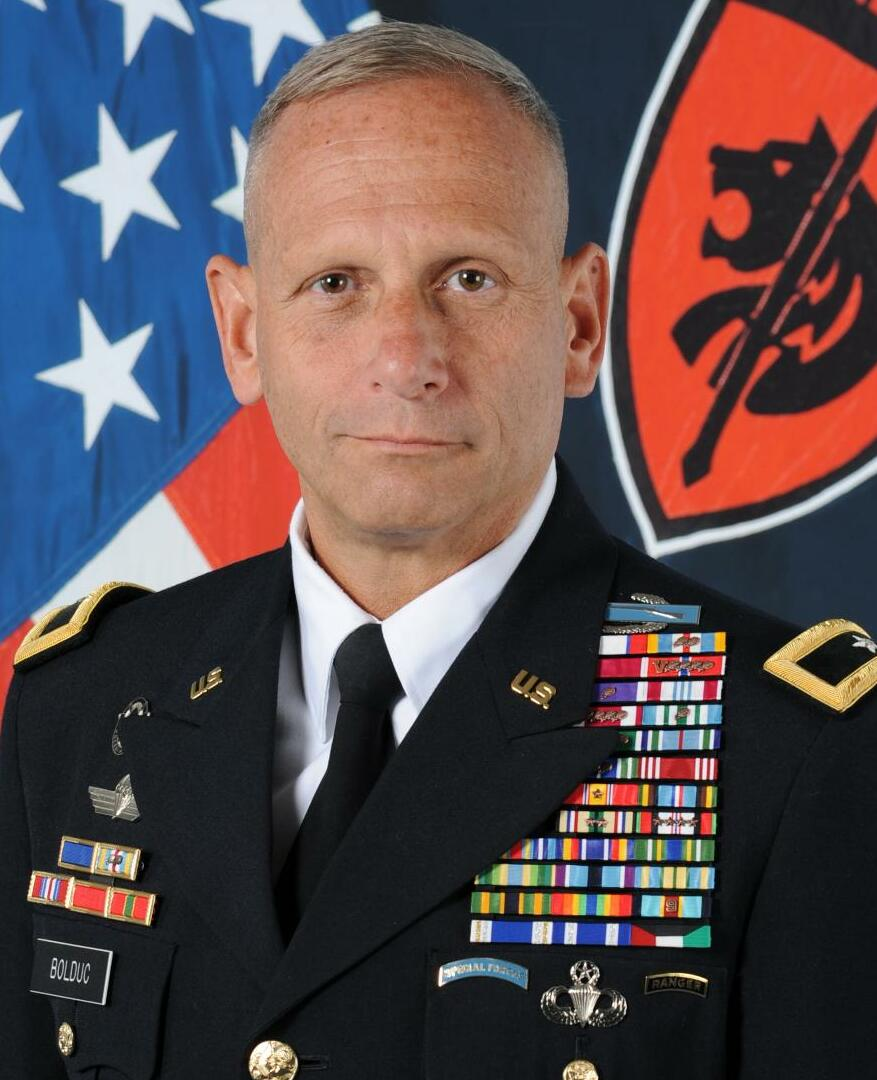
Nominee	Maggie Hassan	Don Bolduc
Party	Democratic	Republican
Popular vote	332,490	275,631
Percentage	53.54%	44.39%
- Hassan: 50–60% 60–70% 70–80% 80–90% >90% Bolduc: 40–50% 50–60% 60–70% 70–80% No votes
U.S. senator before election
Maggie Hassan
Democratic
Elected U.S. senator
Maggie Hassan
Democratic

The 2022 United States Senate election in New Hampshire was held on November 8, 2022, to elect a member of the United States Senate to represent the State of New Hampshire. The primary elections were held on September 13, 2022. Incumbent Senator Maggie Hassan was re-elected over Republican retired Brigadier General Don Bolduc by an unexpectedly large margin of 9.1%, which surpassed most polls. Hassan won her initial bid for this seat in 2016 by only 1,017 votes or 0.14%. This election marked the first time in history that a Democrat won re-election to New Hampshire's Class 3 Senate seat. Hassan won three counties she lost in 2016: Carroll, Hillsborough, and Rockingham.

== Democratic primary ==
=== Candidates ===
==== Nominee ====
- Maggie Hassan, incumbent U.S. senator

==== Eliminated in primary ====
- Paul Krautmann, dentist and candidate for U.S. Senate in 2020
- John Riggieri

=== Endorsements ===
Maggie Hassan

U.S. executive branch officials

- Kamala Harris, 49th vice president of the United States (2021–2025)

Organizations

- AIPAC
- Brady Campaign
- Council for a Livable World
- EMILY's List
- End Citizens United
- Feminist Majority PAC
- Giffords
- Human Rights Campaign
- Humane Society of the United States Legislative Fund
- Jewish Dems
- League of Conservation Voters
- Let America Vote
- NARAL Pro-Choice America
- National Women's Political Caucus
- Natural Resources Defense Council
- Planned Parenthood
- Population Connection Action Fund
- Pro-Israel America
- Sierra Club

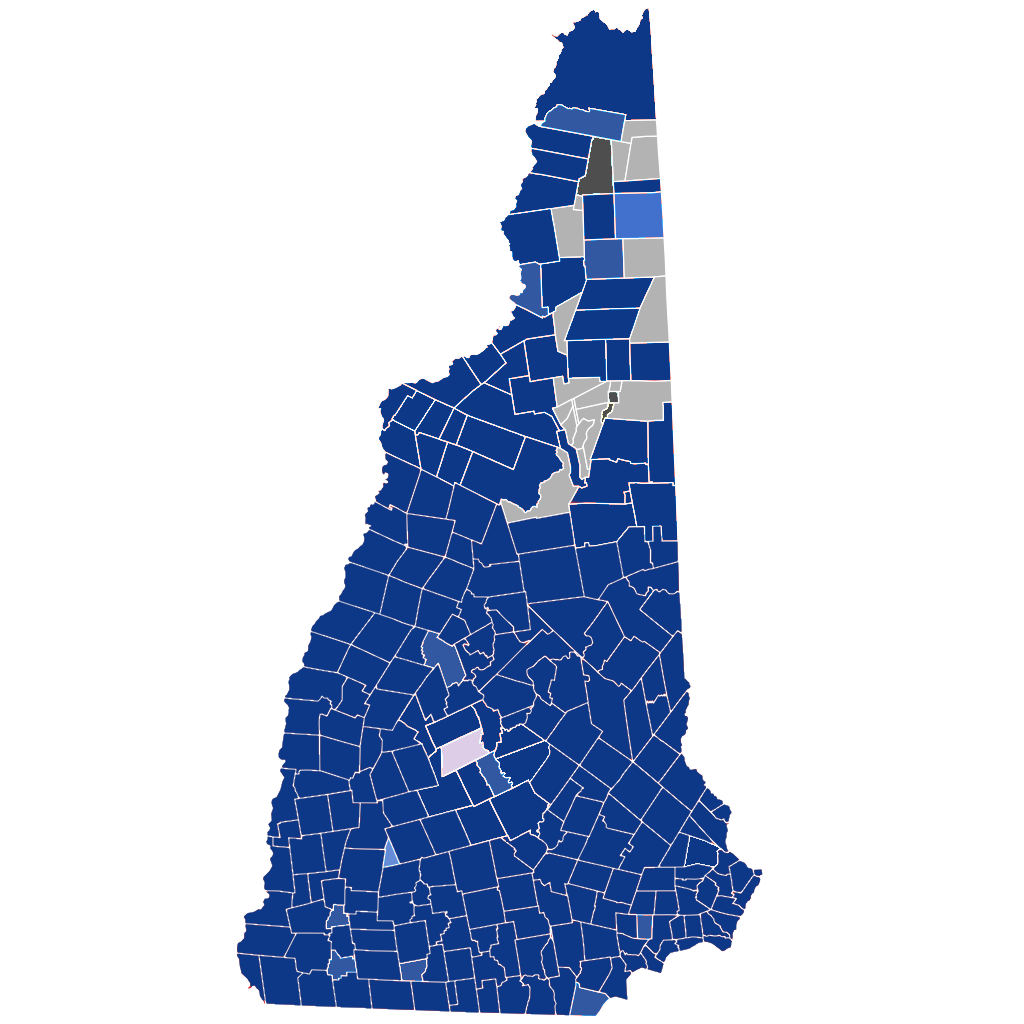
Democratic primary results by municipality: Hassan 60–70% 70–80% 80–90% 90–100% / Other Hassan/Krautmann tie No results No polling places

=== Results ===
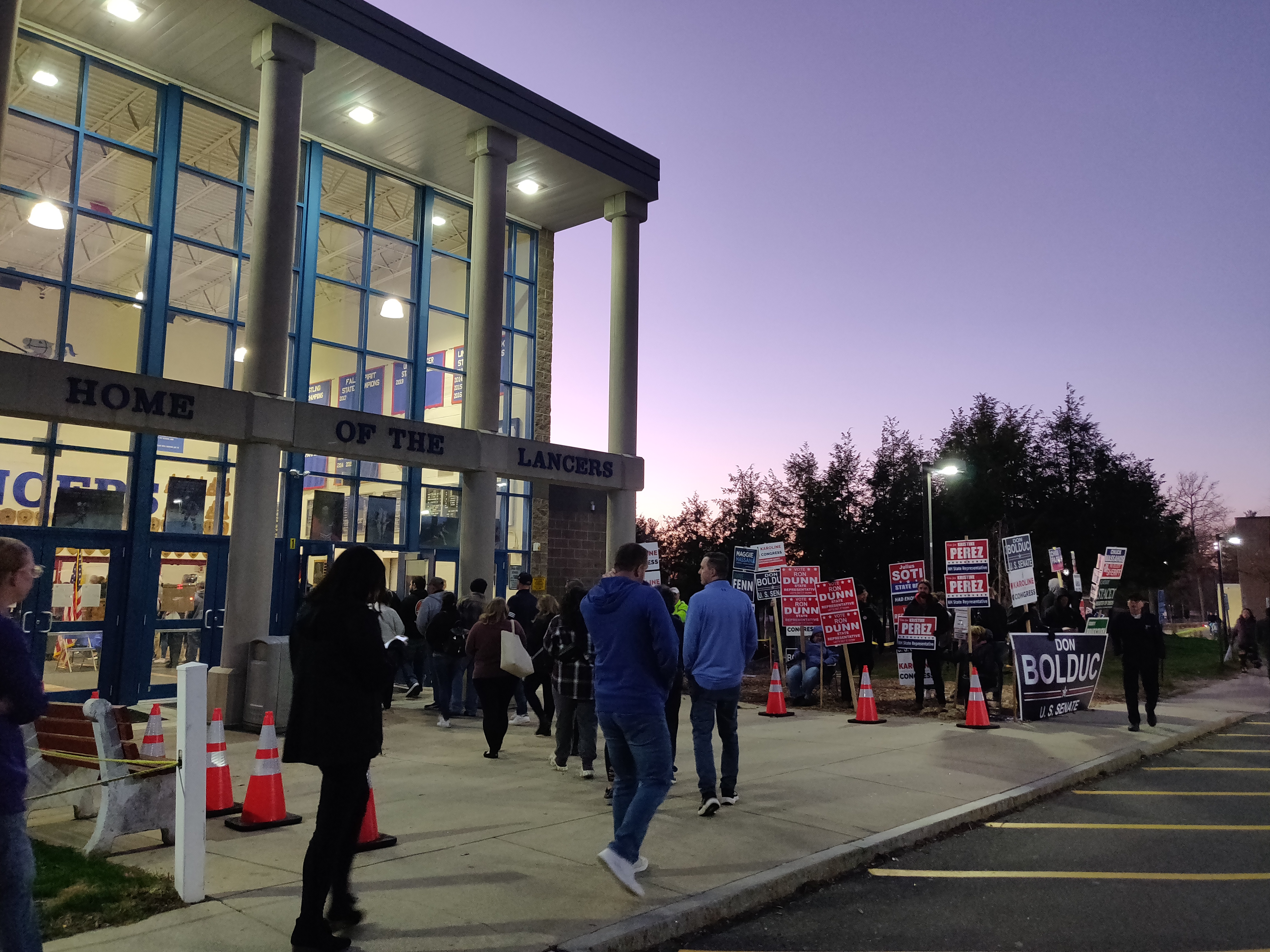
Voters at a polling location in Londonderry

Democratic primary results
Party	Candidate	Votes	%
Democratic	Maggie Hassan (incumbent)	88,146	93.77%
Democratic	Paul Krautmann	3,629	3.86%
Democratic	John Riggieri	1,680	1.79%
Write-in		546	0.58%
Total votes		94,001	100.0%

== Republican primary ==
=== Candidates ===
==== Nominee ====
- Don Bolduc, retired U.S. Army Special Forces brigadier general and candidate for U.S. Senate in 2020

==== Eliminated in primary ====
- Gerard Beloin, roofing contractor and perennial candidate (Note: Candidate for U.S. Senate in 2010, 2014, 2016, and 2020; candidate for New Hampshire's 2nd congressional district in 2012 and 2018)
- John Berman, electronic hardware designer, test engineer, and candidate for U.S. Senate (Kansas and Minnesota) in 2020
- Bruce Fenton, bitcoin advocate, financial analyst and entrepreneur
- Dennis Lamare
- Edmund LaPlante, U.S. Marine Corps veteran
- Vikram Mansharamani, author and businessman
- Chuck Morse, president of the New Hampshire Senate and former acting governor of New Hampshire
- Tejasinha Sivalingam, landlord and candidate for state representative in 2018 and 2020
- Kevin Smith, former Londonderry town manager and candidate for governor of New Hampshire in 2012

==== Declined ====
- Kelly Ayotte, former U.S. senator
- Scott Brown, former U.S. ambassador to New Zealand and Samoa, former U.S. senator from Massachusetts, and nominee for U.S. Senate in New Hampshire in 2014
- Chris Sununu, governor of New Hampshire and brother of former U.S. Senator John Sununu (ran for reelection)

=== Endorsements ===
Don Bolduc

U.S. executive branch officials

- Michael Flynn, former U.S. national security advisor (2017) and former director of the Defense Intelligence Agency (2012–2014) (Democratic)

U.S. senators

- Bob Smith, former U.S. senator from New Hampshire (1990–2003)
Chuck Morse

State officials

- Chris Sununu, governor of New Hampshire (2017–2025)

State legislators

- Jess Edwards, state representative
- J. P. Marzullo, former state representative
- Frank McCarthy, former state representative

Local officials

- Charles Massahos, sheriff of Rockingham County
- John Simonds, sheriff of Sullivan County
- Brian Valerino, sheriff of Coos County

Individuals

- Ovide Lamontagne, Republican nominee for governor in 1996 and 2012

Organizations

- National Rifle Association - Political Victory Fund

Newspapers

- New Hampshire Union Leader
Kevin Smith

State officials

- Craig Benson, former governor of New Hampshire (2003–2005)

U.S. representatives

- Ronny Jackson, U.S. representative from Texas's 13th congressional district (2021–present)

Organizations

- National Border Patrol Council

=== Debates ===
2022 Republican primary debates
No.	Date	Host	Moderator	Link	Participants				
Key: P Participant A Absent N Non-invitee I Invitee W Withdrawn
Key: P Participant A Absent N Non-invitee I Invitee W Withdrawn					Don Bolduc	Kevin Smith	Chuck Morse	Vikram Mansharamani	Bruce Fenton
1	June 27, 2022	NH Journal	Michael Graham; Alicia Xanthopolous; Haris Alic	Link	P	P	P	P	P
2	August 16, 2022	Good Morning New Hampshire	Jack Heath	N/A	P	P	P	P	P
3	August 24, 2022	Newsmax	John Bachmann		P	P	P	N	P
4	September 8, 2022	New Hampshire Institute of Politics; WMUR			P	P	P	P	P

=== Polling ===
Source of poll aggregation	Dates administered	Dates updated	Don Bolduc	Bruce Fenton	Vikram Mansharamani	Chuck Morse	Kevin Smith	Other (Note: Calculated by taking the difference of 100% and all other candidates combined.)	Margin
Real Clear Politics	August 9–29, 2022	August 31, 2022	37.5%	4.5%	3.5%	19.0%	3.5%	32.0%	Bolduc +18.5

Poll source	Date(s) administered	Sample size (Note: Key: A – all adults RV – registered voters LV – likely voters V – unclear)	Margin of error	Don Bolduc	Bruce Fenton	Vikram Mansharamani	Chuck Morse	Kevin Smith	Other	Undecided
Public Policy Polling (D)	September 7–8, 2022	559 (LV)	–	33%	4%	6%	23%	9%	–	25%
University of New Hampshire	August 25–29, 2022	892 (LV)	± 3.3%	43%	5%	5%	22%	3%	2%	20%
Saint Anselm College	August 9–11, 2022	820 (RV)	± 3.4%	32%	4%	2%	16%	4%	2%	39%
University of New Hampshire	April 14–18, 2022	315 (LV)	± 5.5%	33%	1%	–	2%	4%	1%	58%

=== Results ===
Results by county Bolduc: 30–40%; 40–50%; Morse: 30–40%; 40–50%

Republican primary results
Party	Candidate	Votes	%
Republican	Don Bolduc	52,629	36.91%
Republican	Chuck Morse	50,929	35.71%
Republican	Kevin H. Smith	16,621	11.65%
Republican	Vikram Mansharamani	10,690	7.50%
Republican	Bruce Fenton	6,381	4.47%
Republican	John Berman	961	0.67%
Republican	Andy Martin	920	0.64%
Republican	Tejasinha Sivalingam	832	0.58%
Republican	Dennis Lamare	773	0.54%
Republican	Edward Laplante	723	0.51%
Republican	Gerard Beloin	521	0.36%
Democratic	Maggie Hassan (incumbent) (write-in)	316	0.22%
Write-in		307	0.21%
Total votes		142,603	100.0%

== Libertarian convention ==
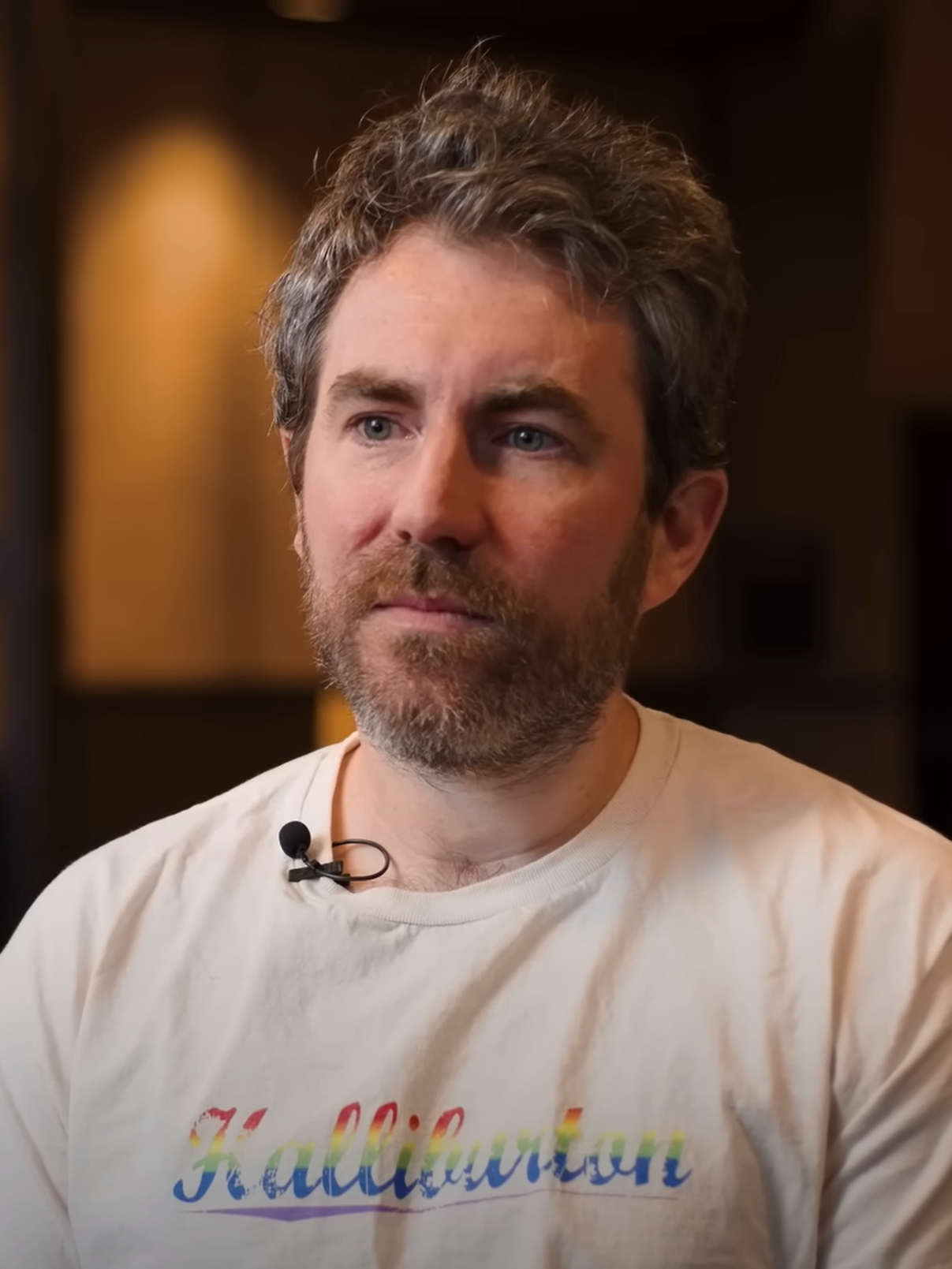
Jeremy Kauffman, the Libertarian nominee

=== Candidates ===
==== Nominee ====
- Jeremy Kauffman, founder and CEO of LBRY, board member of the Free State Project

==== Eliminated at convention ====
- Kevin Kahn

== Independents ==
=== Candidates ===
- Tejasinha Sivalingam (write-in)

==== Did not qualify ====
- Steve Hattamer, physician
- Geoff Woollacott, businessman

== General election ==
=== Predictions ===
Source	Ranking	As of
The Cook Political Report	Lean D	August 18, 2022
Inside Elections	Tilt D	July 1, 2022
Sabato's Crystal Ball	Lean D	August 31, 2022
Politico	Tossup	November 3, 2022
RCP	Tossup	January 10, 2022
Fox News	Lean D	September 20, 2022
DDHQ	Lean D	October 24, 2022
538	Lean D	November 1, 2022
The Economist	Lean D	November 1, 2022

=== Endorsements ===
Maggie Hassan (D)

U.S. executive branch officials

- Kamala Harris, 49th vice president of the United States (2021–2025)
- Marty Walsh, United States secretary of labor (2021–2023) and former mayor of Boston (2014–2021)

U.S. senators

- Cory Booker, U.S. senator from New Jersey (2013–present)
- Doug Jones, U.S. senator from Alabama (2017–2021)
- Chris Murphy, U.S. senator from Connecticut (2013–present)
- Jeanne Shaheen, U.S. senator from New Hampshire (2009–present)
- Jon Tester, U.S. senator from Montana (2007–2025)

U.S. representatives

- Katherine Clark, U.S. representative from Massachusetts's 5th congressional district (2013–present)
- Chris Pappas, U.S. representative from New Hampshire's 1st congressional district (2019–present)

Individuals

- Jill Biden, former First Lady of the United States
- Barbra Streisand, singer

Labor unions

- National Education Association
- United Auto Workers

Newspapers

- Valley News

Organizations

- AIPAC
- Brady Campaign
- Council for a Livable World
- EMILY's List
- End Citizens United
- Feminist Majority PAC
- Giffords
- Human Rights Campaign
- Humane Society of the United States Legislative Fund
- Jewish Dems
- League of Conservation Voters
- Let America Vote
- NARAL Pro-Choice America
- National Women's Political Caucus
- Natural Resources Defense Council
- New Hampshire Police Association
- Planned Parenthood
- Population Connection Action Fund
- Pro-Israel America
- Sierra Club
Don Bolduc (R)

U.S. executive branch officials

- Scott Brown, U.S. ambassador to New Zealand and Samoa (2017–2020); U.S. senator from Massachusetts (2010–2013) and 2014 Republican candidate for the U.S. Senate in New Hampshire
- Michael Flynn, former U.S. national security advisor (2017) and former director of the Defense Intelligence Agency (2012–2014) (Democratic)
- Nikki Haley, United States ambassador to the United Nations (2017–2018) and governor of South Carolina (2011–2017)
- Mike Pompeo, United States secretary of state (2018–2021), director of the Central Intelligence Agency (2017–2018), and former U.S. representative from Kansas's 4th congressional district (2011–2017)
- Donald Trump, 47th, 45th president of the United States (2025–present) (2017–2021)

State officials

- Ron DeSantis, governor of Florida (2019–present)
- Chris Sununu, governor of New Hampshire (2017–2025)

U.S. senators

- John Barrasso, U.S. senator from Wyoming (2007–present)
- Tom Cotton, U.S. senator from Arkansas (2015–present)
- Ted Cruz, U.S. senator from Texas (2013–present)
- Bill Hagerty, U.S. senator from Tennessee (2021–present)
- Rand Paul, U.S. senator from Kentucky (2011–present)
- Rick Scott, U.S. senator from Florida (2019–present)
- Tim Scott, U.S. senator from South Carolina (2013–present)
- Bob Smith, former U.S. senator from New Hampshire (1990–2003)

U.S. representatives

- Tulsi Gabbard, former U.S. representative from Hawaii's 2nd congressional district (2013–2021) (Independent)

Organizations

- National Republican Senatorial Committee

=== Polling ===
Aggregate polls

Source of poll aggregation	Dates administered	Dates updated	Maggie Hassan (D)	Don Bolduc (R)	Other (Note: Calculated by taking the difference of 100% and all other candidates combined.)	Margin
Real Clear Politics	October 28 – November 1, 2022	November 8, 2022	48.7%	47.3%	4.0%	Hassan +1.4
FiveThirtyEight	September 23 – November 5, 2022	November 8, 2022	48.8%	46.6%	4.6%	Hassan +2.2
270towin	October 27 – November 4, 2022	November 8, 2022	49.2%	46.0%	4.8%	Hassan +3.2
Average			48.9%	46.6%	4.5%	Hassan +2.3

Poll source	Date(s) administered	Sample size	Margin of error	Maggie Hassan (D)	Don Bolduc (R)	Other	Undecided
Phillips Academy	November 5–6, 2022	1,056 (LV)	± 3.0%	48%	45%	2% (Note: Kauffman (L) with 2%)	6%
University of New Hampshire	November 2–6, 2022	2,077 (LV)	± 2.2%	50%	48%	1% (Note: Kauffman (L) with 1%; "Another candidate" with <1%)	<1%
InsiderAdvantage (R) (Note: Poll conducted for American Greatness, a conservative news and opinions site.)	November 5, 2022	700 (LV)	± 3.7%	49%	48%	1% (Note: "Someone else" with 1%)	2%
Data for Progress (D)	November 2–5, 2022	1,995 (LV)	± 2.0%	50%	47%	2% (Note: Kauffman (L) with 2%)	–
Wick Insights (R)	November 2–5, 2022	725 (LV)	± 3.6%	48%	48%	2% (Note: "Someone else" with 2%)	1%
Emerson College	October 30 – November 1, 2022	850 (LV)	± 3.3%	49%	45%	3% (Note: Kauffman (L) with 2%; "Someone else" with 1%)	3%
Emerson College	October 30 – November 1, 2022	850 (LV)	± 3.3%	50%	46%	5% (Note: Kauffman (L) with 3%; "Someone else" with 2%)	–
The Trafalgar Group (R)	October 30 – November 1, 2022	1,241 (LV)	± 2.9%	46%	47%	4% (Note: Kauffman (L) with 4%)	3%
Saint Anselm College	October 28–29, 2022	1,541 (LV)	± 2.5%	47%	48%	2% (Note: Kauffman (L) with 2%)	3%
co/efficient (R)	October 25–26, 2022	1,098 (LV)	± 3.2%	45%	45%	3% (Note: Kauffman (L) with 3%)	7%
UMass Lowell/YouGov	October 14–25, 2022	600 (LV)	± 5.1%	51%	41%	3% (Note: Kauffman (L) with 3%)	5%
InsiderAdvantage (R)	October 23, 2022	600 (LV)	± 4.0%	48%	47%	3% (Note: "Someone else" with 3%)	3%
Emerson College	October 18–19, 2022	727 (LV)	± 3.6%	48%	45%	3% (Note: Kauffman (L) with 2%; "Someone else" with 1%)	4%
Emerson College	October 18–19, 2022	727 (LV)	± 3.6%	50%	45%	5% (Note: Kauffman (L) with 3%; "Someone else" with 2%)	–
Fabrizio, Lee & Associates (R) (Note: This poll was sponsored by Bolduc's campaign.)	October 17–19, 2022	600 (LV)	–	49%	47%	–	4%
Data for Progress (D)	October 14–19, 2022	1,392 (LV)	± 3.0%	50%	44%	3% (Note: Kauffman (L) with 3%)	4%
Fabrizio Ward (R)/Impact Research (D) (Note: This poll was sponsored by AARP.)	October 2–6, 2022	500 (LV)	± 4.4%	52%	45%	2%	1%
The Trafalgar Group (R)	September 26–30, 2022	1,081 (LV)	± 2.9%	48%	45%	4% (Note: Kauffman (L) with 4%)	3%
Data for Progress (D)	September 23–30, 2022	1,147 (LV)	± 3.0%	50%	43%	3% (Note: Kauffman (L) with 3%)	4%
Saint Anselm College	September 27–28, 2022	901 (RV)	± 3.3%	49%	43%	4% (Note: "Someone else" with 4%)	4%
Suffolk University	September 23–26, 2022	500 (LV)	± 4.4%	50%	41%	3% (Note: Kauffman (L) with 3%)	7%
American Research Group	September 15–19, 2022	555 (RV)	± 4.2%	53%	40%	–	7%
University of New Hampshire	September 15–19, 2022	870 (LV)	± 3.3%	49%	41%	5% (Note: Kauffman (L) with 5%)	5%
Emerson College	September 14–15, 2022	800 (LV)	± 3.4%	51%	40%	4%	5%
Data for Progress (D) (Note: Archived July 21, 2022, at the Wayback Machine)	June 22 – July 8, 2022	903 (LV)	± 3.0%	49%	45%	–	6%
Change Research (D) (Note: This poll was sponsored by Future Majority and America’s Future Majority Fund.)	June 24–27, 2022	704 (LV)	± 3.7%	49%	40%	–	11%
University of New Hampshire	April 14–18, 2022	868 (LV)	± 3.5%	47%	46%	1%	6%
Phillips Academy	April 4–8, 2022	533 (A)	± 4.2%	45%	40%	–	15%
Phillips Academy	April 4–8, 2022	471 (RV)	± 4.5%	54%	39%	–	7%
Saint Anselm College	March 23–24, 2022	1,265 (RV)	± 2.8%	44%	39%	7%	10%
Saint Anselm College	January 11–12, 2022	1,215 (RV)	± 2.8%	43%	36%	10%	12%
The Trafalgar Group (R)	December 10–12, 2021	1,041 (LV)	± 3.0%	46%	40%	–	14%
University of New Hampshire	October 14–18, 2021	979 (LV)	± 3.1%	47%	42%	6%	6%
University of New Hampshire	July 15–19, 2021	1,540 (LV)	± 2.5%	51%	41%	1%	6%
University of New Hampshire	February 18–22, 2021	1,676 (LV)	± 2.4%	52%	39%	2%	7%

Hypothetical polling

Maggie Hassan vs. Kelly Ayotte

Poll source	Date(s) administered	Sample size	Margin of error	Maggie Hassan (D)	Kelly Ayotte (R)	Other	Undecided
University of New Hampshire	October 14–18, 2021	979 (LV)	± 3.1%	44%	43%	7%	5%
University of New Hampshire	July 15–19, 2021	1,540 (LV)	± 2.5%	49%	45%	3%	3%
University of New Hampshire	February 18–22, 2021	1,676 (LV)	± 2.4%	48%	43%	3%	6%

Maggie Hassan vs. Bruce Fenton

Poll source	Date(s) administered	Sample size	Margin of error	Maggie Hassan (D)	Bruce Fenton (R)	Other	Undecided
University of New Hampshire	April 14–18, 2022	868 (LV)	± 3.5%	46%	40%	0%	14%

Maggie Hassan vs. Chuck Morse
Aggregate polls

Source of poll aggregation	Dates administered	Dates updated	Maggie Hassan (D)	Chuck Morse (R)	Other (Note: Calculated by taking the difference of 100% and all other candidates combined.)	Margin
Real Clear Politics	December 10, 2021 – April 18, 2022	April 21, 2022	44.3%	40.0%	15.7%	Hassan +4.3

Poll source	Date(s) administered	Sample size	Margin of error	Maggie Hassan (D)	Chuck Morse (R)	Other	Undecided
Data for Progress (D)	June 22 – July 8, 2022	903 (LV)	± 3.0%	49%	46%	–	5%
University of New Hampshire	April 14–18, 2022	868 (LV)	± 3.5%	44%	46%	1%	9%
Phillips Academy	April 4–8, 2022	533 (A)	± 4.2%	43%	40%	–	17%
Phillips Academy	April 4–8, 2022	471 (RV)	± 4.5%	51%	45%	–	6%
Saint Anselm College	March 23–24, 2022	1,265 (RV)	± 2.8%	43%	36%	10%	11%
Saint Anselm College	January 11–12, 2022	1,215 (RV)	± 2.8%	41%	27%	17%	15%
The Trafalgar Group (R)	December 10–12, 2021	1,041 (LV)	± 3.0%	46%	38%	–	16%

Maggie Hassan vs. Corey Lewandowski

Poll source	Date(s) administered	Sample size	Margin of error	Maggie Hassan (D)	Corey Lewandowski (R)	Other	Undecided
University of New Hampshire	February 18–22, 2021	1,676 (LV)	± 2.4%	53%	34%	3%	9%

Maggie Hassan vs. Corky Messner

Poll source	Date(s) administered	Sample size	Margin of error	Maggie Hassan (D)	Corky Messner (R)	Undecided
The Tarrance Group (R) (Note: Poll sponsored by Messner's campaign)	November 16–18, 2021	500 (LV)	± 4.5%	47%	45%	8%

Maggie Hassan vs. Kevin Smith

Poll source	Date(s) administered	Sample size	Margin of error	Maggie Hassan (D)	Kevin Smith (R)	Other	Undecided
Data for Progress (D)	June 22 – July 8, 2022	903 (LV)	± 3.0%	49%	45%	–	6%
University of New Hampshire	April 14–18, 2022	868 (LV)	± 3.5%	45%	44%	1%	10%
Saint Anselm College	March 23–24, 2022	1,265 (RV)	± 2.8%	44%	34%	10%	12%
Saint Anselm College	January 11–12, 2022	1,215 (RV)	± 2.8%	42%	24%	17%	17%

Maggie Hassan vs. Chris Sununu

Poll source	Date(s) administered	Sample size	Margin of error	Maggie Hassan (D)	Chris Sununu (R)	Other	Undecided
Saint Anselm College	October 20–22, 2021	1,323 (RV)	± 2.7%	41%	46%	9%	4%
University of New Hampshire	October 14–18, 2021	979 (LV)	± 3.1%	42%	45%	6%	6%
Saint Anselm College	August 24–26, 2021	1,855 (RV)	± 2.3%	41%	49%	6%	4%
University of New Hampshire	July 15–19, 2021	1,540 (LV)	± 2.5%	48%	49%	1%	2%
Saint Anselm College	March 4–6, 2021	871 (RV)	± 3.3%	41%	47%	7%	6%
University of New Hampshire	February 18–22, 2021	1,676 (LV)	± 2.4%	46%	48%	2%	5%

Generic Democrat vs. generic Republican

Poll source	Date(s) administered	Sample size	Margin of error	Generic Democrat	Generic Republican	Other	Undecided
Fabrizio Ward (R)	October 17–19, 2022	500 (LV)	± 4.0%	48%	47%	–	4%
Phillips Academy	April 4–8, 2022	533 (A)	± 4.2%	32%	46%	–	22%
Phillips Academy	April 4–8, 2022	471 (RV)	± 4.5%	36%	48%	–	16%
The Tarrance Group (R)	November 16–18, 2021	500 (LV)	± 4.5%	42%	45%	–	13%

on if Maggie Hassan should be re-elected

Poll source	Date(s) administered	Sample size	Margin of error	Yes	No	Undecided
Saint Anselm College	August 9–11, 2022	1,898 (RV)	± 2.3%	39%	53%	8%

=== Debates ===
2022 United States Senate general election in New Hampshire debates
No.	Date	Host	Moderator	Link	Democratic	Republican
Key: P Participant A Absent N Non-invitee I Invitee W Withdrawn						
Key: P Participant A Absent N Non-invitee I Invitee W Withdrawn					Maggie Hassan	Donald C. Bolduc
1	October 27, 2022	NHPR	Josh Rogers, Amanda Gokee		P	P
1	November 1, 2022	Saint Anselm College	Adam Sexton		P	P

=== Results ===
In the early months of the campaign, Hassan maintained a healthy lead in the polls. Polls began to tighten around September 2022, and by late October, a few polls even showed Bolduc with a narrow lead or had the candidates tied. Most pundits concurred that Hassan had a very slight edge and that the race would be extremely tight. However, Hassan won reelection by 9 points, a margin considerably wider than what was expected and one far greater than her 0.14 point plurality in 2016. Hassan's victory made her the first Democrat to win re-election to the Class 3 Senate seat in New Hampshire history. This, along with Democrats' comfortable victories in New Hampshire's two House races, affirmed New Hampshire's transition from a closely contested swing state to a clearly Democratic leaning state at the federal level.

2022 United States Senate election in New Hampshire
Party	Candidate	Votes	%	±%
Democratic	Maggie Hassan (incumbent)	332,490	53.54%	+5.56%
Republican	Don Bolduc	275,631	44.39%	−3.45%
Libertarian	Jeremy Kauffman	12,390	2.00%	+0.30%
Write-in		464	0.07%	–
Total votes		620,975	100.0%	
Democratic hold				

==== By county ====
By county

2022 Senate election results in New Hampshire (by county)
County	Maggie Hassan Democratic		Don Bolduc Republican		Other votes		Total votes
	#	%	#	%	#	%	#
Belknap	13,669	44.4%	16,591	53.9%	537	1.7%	30,797
Carroll	13,708	50.5%	13,014	48.0%	415	1.5%	27,137
Cheshire	20,083	59.1%	13,241	38.9%	684	2.0%	34,008
Coös	6,059	47.0%	6,491	50.3%	353	2.7%	12,903
Grafton	26,337	61.6%	15,544	36.3%	891	2.1%	42,772
Hillsborough	91,776	53.2%	76,862	44.6%	3,738	2.2%	172,376
Merrimack	39,367	55.6%	29,965	42.3%	1,526	2.2%	70,858
Rockingham	78,047	50.6%	73,244	47.4%	3,096	2.0%	154,387
Strafford	33,240	58.7%	22,217	39.2%	1,161	2.1%	56,618
Sullivan	9,907	51.8%	8,759	45.8%	453	2.4%	19,119

Counties that flipped from Republican to Democratic

- Carroll (largest municipality: Conway)
- Hillsborough (largest municipality: Manchester)
- Rockingham (largest municipality: Derry)

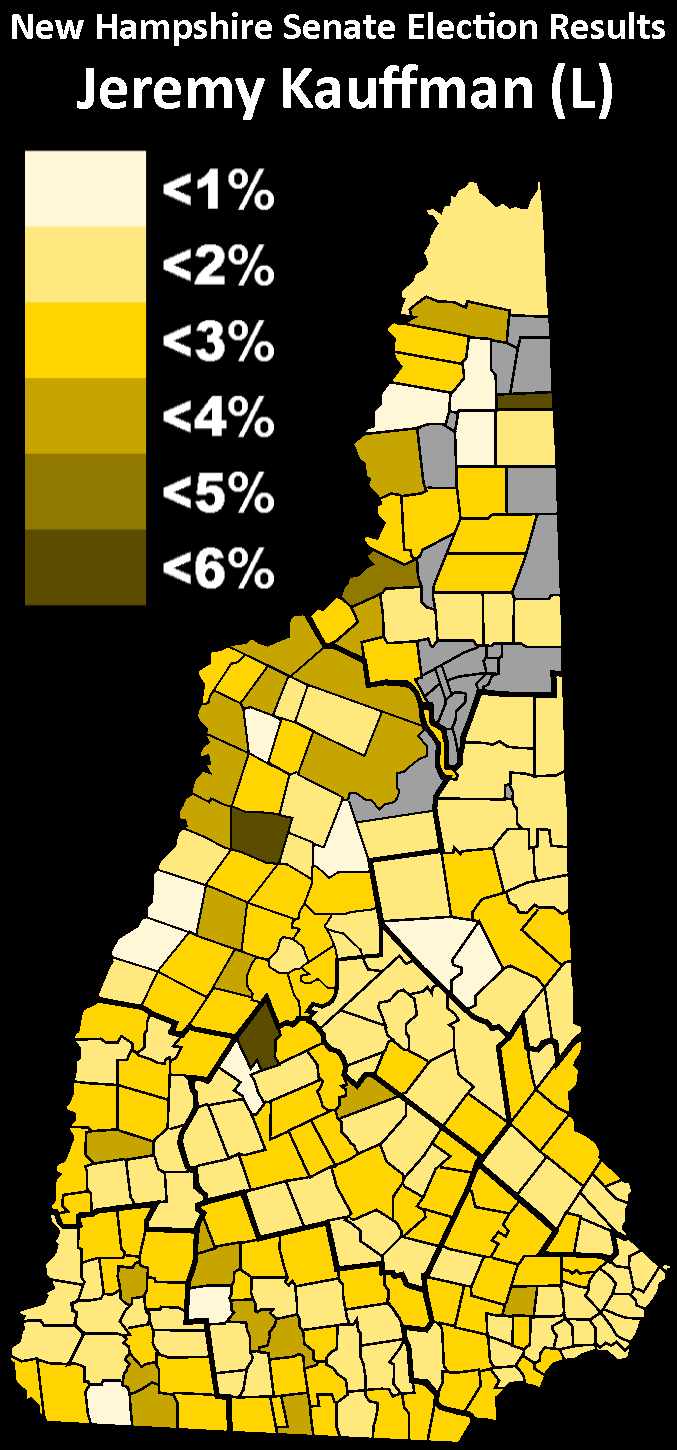
Jeremy Kauffman - election results by municipality

==== By congressional district ====
Hassan won both congressional districts.

District	Hassan	Bolduc	Representative
1st	53%	45%	Chris Pappas
2nd	54%	44%	Annie Kuster

== See also ==
- 2022 United States Senate elections

== Notes ==
Partisan clients
