= Jeremy Kauffman =

American entrepreneur (born 1984)

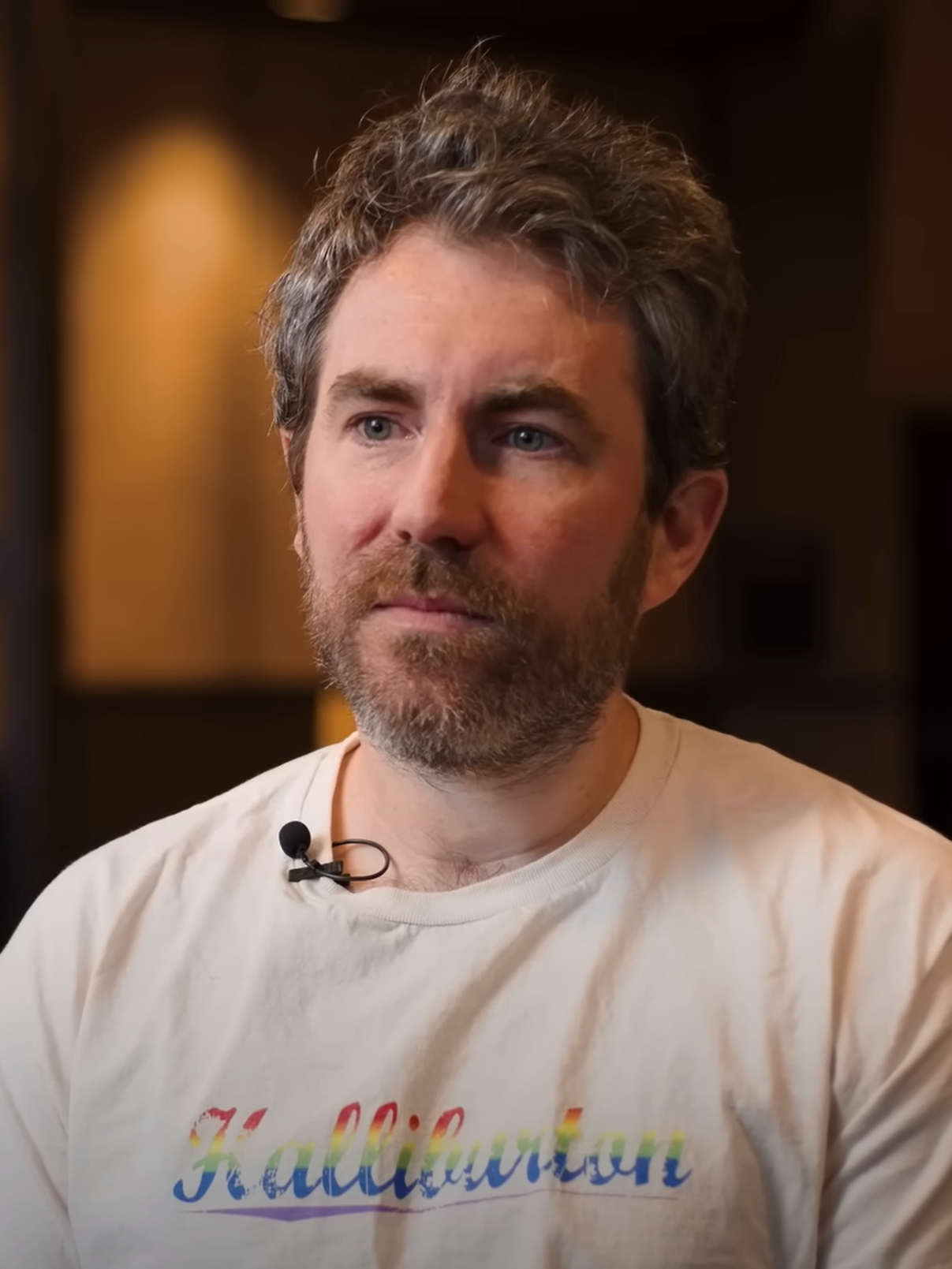
- Kauffman in 2022
- Born: September 19, 1984 (age 42)
- Education: Rensselaer Polytechnic Institute (BS, BS)
- Occupation: Businessman
- Known for: LBRY; Free State Project; Libertarian Party of New Hampshire
- Political party: Libertarian
- Other political affiliations: Mises Caucus
- Spouse: Rachel
- Children: 4
- Website: jeremy4nh.com

Jeremy Kauffman (born September 19, 1984) is an American entrepreneur and political activist known for founding and leading the blockchain-based filesharing project LBRY. Kauffman is also known as a vocal supporter and activist within the Free State Project (FSP) and a former board member. The FSP is a movement designed to get libertarians to move to the state of New Hampshire. Kauffman was the Libertarian nominee in the 2022 United States Senate election in New Hampshire, losing to Democrat Maggie Hassan. Kauffman, elected the chair of Libertarian Party of New Hampshire in 2026, is known for his provocative statements made on its Twitter account that have been deemed violent, racist, and antisemitic.

== Early life ==
Kauffman was born on September 19, 1984. He earned two Bachelor of Science degrees in physics and computer science at Rensselaer Polytechnic Institute.

== Business career ==
Jeremy Kauffman was CEO of TopScore prior to formulating the idea for a version of YouTube that would be decentralized in its construction and operation. The result of this idea for a media and video viewing platform that claimed to be fully decentralized was called LBRY (pronounced as "library"). LBRY was launched in 2015. When asked about the purpose of LBRY, Kauffman stated that while the LBRY blockchain could be used in a 'Wild West' kind of way, the main goal of the platform was to provide people with choices for content.

Following an investigation by the SEC regarding the issuance of a cryptocurrency token called "LBRY credit" (LBC)., a federal judge in November 2022 ruled that LBC is legally a security that requires regulation by the SEC. Kauffman has not yet commented on whether he intends to appeal the decision or to settle with the SEC but has said the decision "threatens the entire U.S. cryptocurrency industry" by classifying "almost every cryptocurrency" as a security. Upon hearing that Gary Gensler would be the head of the SEC, Kauffman was hopeful that an M.I.T. professor who specialized in cryptocurrency would be fair to the new industry and to not be "a complete sociopath."

Odysee, an open-source video-sharing website that uses the LBRY network, was founded by members of the LBRY team in 2020.

In October 2023, LBRY Inc. declared bankruptcy due to significant financial difficulties and mounting legal pressures following the SEC's classification of LBRY Credits (LBC) as a security. The bankruptcy led to the forced sale of Odysee, which was acquired by Forward Research, a firm specializing in decentralized technology. The sale marked the end of LBRY’s direct involvement with Odysee, though the platform continues to operate under new ownership.

== Political activity ==
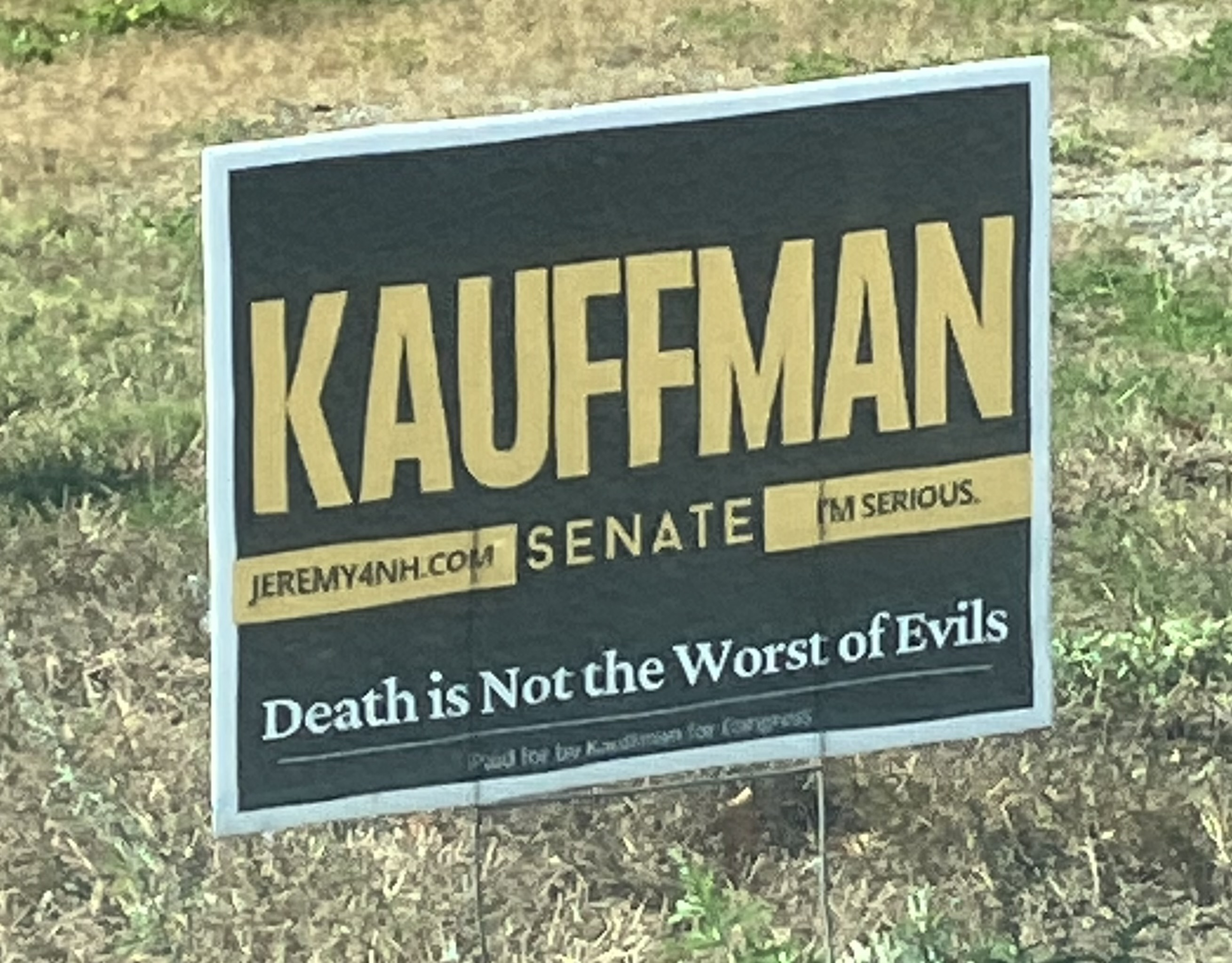
Kauffman senatorial campaign sign

In 2018, Kauffman joined the board of directors of the non-profit, the Free State Project. Kauffman believes that the Free State Project is the most effective way for libertarians to achieve "liberty in our lifetimes" and has debated this assertion in a public forum. Kauffman is also a member of the Libertarian Party's Mises Caucus.

In April 2021, Kauffman was given access to Libertarian Party of New Hampshire (LPNH)'s official Twitter account soon after the state party was taken over by the Mises Caucus. Kauffman later made tweets on the LPNH account that received controversy, such as by calling for child labor to be legalized, for the Civil Rights Act to be repealed, and for the Guantanamo Bay detention camp to be reopened "so that Anthony Fauci and every governor that locked their state down can be sent there, never again to be allowed inside of the United States". The pro-child labor tweet specifically received pushback from 2012 and 2016 Libertarian presidential nominee Gary Johnson, saying "This isn't what libertarianism means to millions of Americans". The tweets later partly resulted in the resignation of the national Libertarian Party leader Joe-Bishop Henchman. Kauffman defended his actions by saying the tweets were good for libertarians, and accused national party leadership of being "woke neoliberal globalists".

At Porcupine Freedom Festival 2021, an annual libertarian festival held in New Hampshire, Executive Director of the Free State Project, Jeremy Kauffman and chair of the Libertarian Party Angela McArdle debated which strategy is more effective. Kauffman argued that, "There are more people in this room that are elected members to the NH House of Representatives and former members of the Libertarian Party than there are Libertarian Party members nationwide." McArdle argued that, while she wants to see the Free State Project succeed, the Free State Project could not have existed without the political infrastructure provided by the Libertarian Party developed over the course of five decades.

In 2022, Kauffman ran for the United States Senate as a Libertarian in New Hampshire. In response to a question as to why he was running for office, he replied, "I'm the only one running that will actually make the government smaller". Among his key campaign issues are "abolishing the Federal Reserve, the Internal Revenue Service and child-labor laws", "making sure the lockdowns and restrictions can't happen again" and committing "to end the drug war". In a New Hampshire Public Radio interview, Kauffman stated that he wanted "less democracy," elaborating that he does not want people in California and New York voting on his life in New Hampshire and that it is permissible to "let states disagree" under the U.S. system of federalism. While some polls initially indicated that Kauffman's run would have a vote splitting effect between Maggie Hassan and Don Bolduc, Hassan beat Bolduc by about 9 points, and Kauffman received about 2% of the total vote.

In late September 2023, Kauffman was expelled from the Free State Project Board during a voting session. The vote came weeks after continued agitation by Kauffman against other Free State members such as Carla Gericke as well as the organizations founder Jason Sorens. The board cited Kauffman’s internet trolling and perceived promotion of racism on social media as reasons for his expulsion.

In 2024, Kauffman nominated Toad (Joshua Anderson) as a satirical presidential candidate at the 2024 Libertarian Convention. After holding up a sign "MAGA = Socialist" at an appearance of Donald Trump, Kauffman later endorsed Trump, calling the Libertarian nominee, Chase Oliver, a "gay race communist."

In September 2024, the LPNH posted on X that "Anyone who murders Kamala Harris would be an American hero." In a statement to the Boston Globe, Kauffman told the paper that the LPNH "believes that the journalists at the Boston Globe are as evil as rapists or murderers. ... A proper society would exclude Globe journalists from residing within it entirely".

Kauffman has criticized the end of apartheid in South Africa, calling the movement to end it "race-based bitter leftism" that led to the destruction of the country. He has said that "One can imagine better systems than apartheid, but South Africa is now much worse having removed it."

Following a speech from Kauffman—who had recently been elected chair of the state party—in May 2026, the Libertarian National Committee voted 15–2 to disaffiliate the Libertarian Party of New Hampshire. The Libertarian National Committee cited "crudely and repeatedly undermined our own candidates and have espoused numerous anti-libertarian positions on a National level" along with violating the committee's bylaws by endorsing non-Libertarian candidates.

== Personal life ==
Kauffman has four children with his wife Rachel. Kauffman is Jewish.

Kauffman was arrested in April 2026 and charged with disorderly conduct following a traffic collision in a New Hampshire grocery store parking lot. Initially it had been reported that Kauffman was involved in a fender bender and a verbal altercation allegedly ensued. Kauffman defended his conduct in the incident, writing “Low IQ schizophrenic Africans who scream at kids in parking lots should be deported from New Hampshire. We shouldn’t punish decent men who stand up to them." Kauffman had uploaded a video he had filmed of the incident to Twitter/X. On June 30, 2026, Kauffman was cleared of any wrongdoing, and all charges were dropped.

== See also ==
- New Hampshire Liberty Alliance
- New Hampshire Liberty Forum

Party political offices
Preceded by Brian Chabot	Libertarian nominee for U.S. Senator from New Hampshire (Class 3); 2022	Most recent
