= Jacob Duygu =

German-Kurdish firearms designer (c. 1993–2021)

- Duygu c. 2020
- Born: c. 1993; Germany
- Died: October, 2021; Hannover, Niedersachsen, Germany
- Other name: JStark1809
- Occupations: Firearms designer, former soldier
- Known for: Creator of the FGC-9 3D-printed firearm

Jacob Duygu (c. 1993 – 1.7.2021), known online as JStark1809, was a German firearms designer and former Bundeswehr soldier. He is best known for designing the FGC-9, a semi-automatic 9mm carbine that can be manufactured using a 3D printer and widely available parts.

== Early life ==
Duygu was born in Germany around 1993 to Kurdish parents. He lived in Hannover before moving to Völklingen in the summer of 2020, where he lived in relative isolation.

== Military service ==
Duygu enlisted in the Bundeswehr, the German armed forces, in 2015 as an enlisted soldier. He served in a logistics unit, where he advanced to the rank of junior non-commissioned officer (Unteroffizier). During his service in the mid-2010s, he received basic firearms training, including use of the G36 assault rifle. However, as a member of a non-combat logistics role, his operational access to firearms was limited to training exercises, and German law prohibited him from owning one privately despite his military experience. Duygu left the Bundeswehr before 2018.

== Development of the FGC-9 ==
Between 2018 and 2020, Duygu designed the FGC-9 under the pseudonym JStark1809 as part of the Deterrence Dispensed network, a decentralized group focused on 3D-printed firearms. The pseudonym references American military officer John Stark and the year 1809, when he introduced the famous motto "Live free or die". The firearm uses a 3D-printed polymer lower receiver, an electrochemically machined barrel, and commercially available springs and hardware store parts.

The design was publicly released on 27 March 2020 through online file-sharing platforms. An updated version, the FGC-9 MkII, was developed by Duygu in collaboration with designers "3socksandcrocs" and "Ivan the Troll" (Ivanthetroll), with initial announcements in October 2020 and full files released on 16 April 2021 via DEFCAD and Odysee by user "The Gatalog". The MkII incorporated several refinements to simplify construction and enhance reliability, including a full-length Picatinny top rail for optics and accessories, an H&K MP5-style charging handle, an enclosed ejector design, an integrated sling loop, a more durable bolt, and a switch to metric hardware for global parts availability. It also bundled supporting files, such as the Common Sense Gun Control Group (CSGCG) 3D-printable AR-15 trigger group and the updated Menendez Magazine 2.0 (a Glock-compatible printable magazine with improved fitment and lifespan). These changes built on prior incremental releases, like the ECMv2.0 barrel machining process, and were accompanied by an expanded manual with pictorial guides.

== Death ==
On 24 June 2021, German federal police (Bundeskriminalamt, BKA) raided Duygu's apartment in Völklingen, Saarland, as part of an international investigation into the distribution of 3D-printed firearm designs. The operation, involving a commando unit, was triggered by cryptocurrency transaction alerts from UK financial intelligence units linked to the Deterrence Dispensed network.

During the search, authorities seized a 3D printer, multiple mobile phones, hard drives, a laptop, and other digital storage devices. No completed firearms, firearm components, or manufacturing equipment beyond the printer were found, and no evidence of imminent threats was identified. Duygu was not arrested, as the seized materials did not meet the threshold for immediate charges under German law.

Several days later, in early July 2021, Duygu was found dead in his car. An autopsy conducted by Saarland authorities concluded that the cause of death was consistent with natural causes, most likely a heart attack, potentially exacerbated by stress and a pre-existing congenital heart condition. No evidence of suicide, foul play, or external injury was found. The exact date of death has not been publicly disclosed, but it occurred within a week of the raid.

The timing of his death led to speculation within online 3D-gun communities, though German authorities and subsequent investigations found no causal link between the raid and his passing.
