= Finley Smith =

American firearms enthusiast

Finley Smith is an American firearm educator and animator who runs Rainbow Reload in Manchester, New Hampshire, a queer-focused firearm and self-defense training group. Smith runs the YouTube channel Queer Armorer, which discusses firearms techniques, community building and community defense projects, and media and gender analysis.

== Activism ==
Smith was an EMT and served as a street medic volunteer at several protests.

=== Rainbow Reload ===
In November 2020, Smith created Rainbow Reload, an organization that helps queer people train with firearms in New Hampshire. Originally a chapter of the Pink Pistols, the group changed names to avoid association with Trump rallies attended by the head of Pink Pistols. Smith leads small groups in beginner-oriented range days during trips into wooded areas in New Hampshire. Smith's trainings focus on handgun and shotgun defensive skill classes, in an effort to "be dangerous back to a dangerous world."

In 2023, Tucker Carlson described Rainbow Reload's work as "disgusting" and referred to Smith as both a "domestic terrorist" and a "faithful servant of the Democratic Party". Charlie Kirk referred to Smith as "Antifa and the Trans Mafia" and implied that they were responsible for the destruction of the country's morals.

=== Queer Armorer ===
In 2021, Smith created the Queer Armorer channel out of a desire for queer-oriented firearms content accessible to beginners. The content initially focused on live video; however, by late 2025 the channel had shifted to largely animated video. This shift happened in equal parts due to a desire to focus on educational content and a cardiac medical issue.

=== 3D firearm development ===
Smith has worked on a variety of 3D printed firearm projects, including helping with the development of the Mac DB9 and various accessories. In 2022, they helped several rebel groups set up 3D production of firearms in Myanmar. During that work they created a version of the top rail of the FGC-9 for use in Myanmar by rebels fighting with limited access to optics due to the country's gun control laws prior to the revolution. However, its use was limited, as a team from Deterrence Dispensed developed printable iron sights that allowed for more flexibility.

== Personal life ==
Smith's pronouns are they/them or she/her.
