= Deterrence Dispensed =

Online group developing open-source firearm technology

Deterrence Dispensed (DetDisp) is a decentralized, online collective that promotes and distributes designs for open-source 3D-printed firearms, gun parts, and handloaded cartridges. The group describes itself as aligned with the freedom of speech and anti-copyright movements.

DetDisp is best known for developing and releasing the FGC-9, a semi-automatic 3D-printed carbine requiring no regulated gun parts. The group has been linked to the publication of the 3D files for the gun that killed UnitedHealth CEO Brian Thompson.

== History ==
In February 2019, a group of 3D gun designers chose the name "Deterrence Dispensed" as a reference to Defense Distributed, the first 3D firearms organization. By 2020 the group claimed thousands of members, many of whom lived in jurisdictions where unlicensed firearm production was illegal. Prominent among the group's pseudonymous members was the late German-Kurdish gun designer Jacob Duygu.

Deterrence Dispensed has used multiple, alternative social networks and platforms due to suspensions from mainstream sites, including Tumblr and Keybase. At one time, Deterrence Dispensed was the sixth most popular team on the Keybase platform, but by January 2021 they would be banned, a decision attributed to Keybase's acquisition by Zoom Video Communications. The group has published files and blueprints on file-sharing websites built by LBRY, including the website Odysee, and has attempted to rebrand itself under the name "The Gatalog".

In November 2024, the group's administrator Peter Celentano was arrested by the New York State Police and faces over 1,000 firearms-related charges. In December of 2024, The Gatalog took credit for releasing the files for the printable frame and suppressor allegedly used by Luigi Mangione in the killing of UnitedHealthcare CEO Brian Thompson.

In January 2026, the founders of Deterrence Dispensed, including John Elik and Matthew Larosiere, were sued by the State of California for distributing hundreds of 3D gun files to individuals in violation of multiple state laws. Attorney General Rob Bonta and San Francisco City Attorney David Chiu announced the lawsuit as a "landmark" event that would hold the defendants accountable for spreading machine gun conversion devices, "Glock switches," large-capacity magazines, and other illegal products to individuals without a license to manufacture firearms in California.

== Designs ==
Deterrence Dispensed is best known for developing and releasing the FGC-9, a 3D-printed carbine, as well as the FMDA 19.2, which was allegedly used by Luigi Mangione in the killing of Brian Thompson. At the peak of its popularity, the group distributed blueprints for AR-15s, an AKM receiver called the "Plastikov", handgun frames, and a magazine for Glock pistols named after New Jersey Senator Bob Menendez, who once pushed for crackdowns on the online sharing of 3D-printable firearms designs. In 2019 the group released a design called the "Yankee Boogle", which is an auto sear that converts a semi-automatic AR-15 into a fully automatic one.

== Criticism ==
Since the death of JStark, former members of DetDisp have been criticized for founding organizations in opposition to the original open source and anti-copyright values of the organization.

== See also ==
- FGC-9
- Urutau 3D-printable firearm
- List of 3D-printed weapons and parts
- 3D-printed firearm
- Improvised firearm
- Right to keep and bear arms
- Gun control
- Crypto-anarchy
- 3D printing
