= Don Bolduc =

United States Army brigadier general

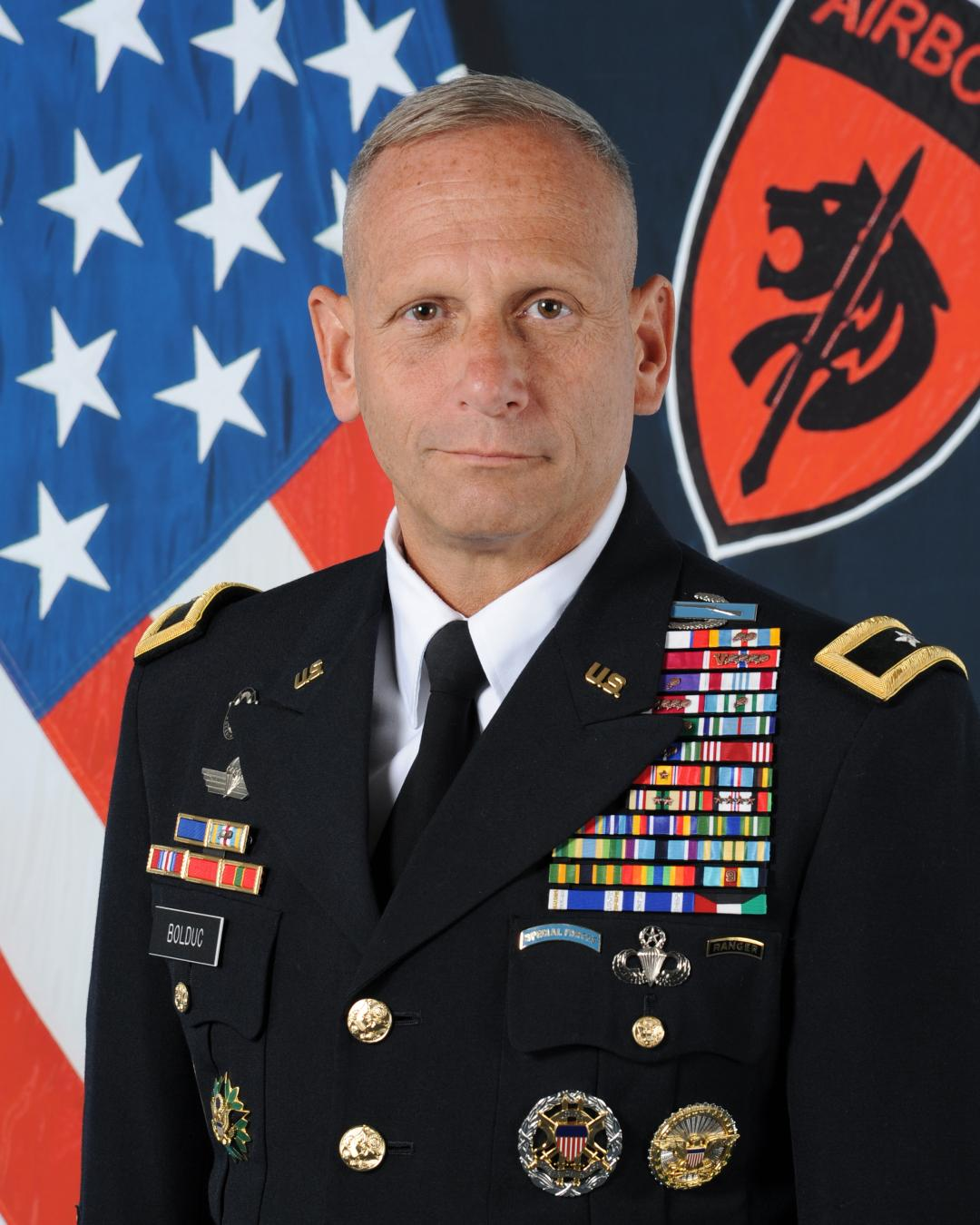

Personal details
- Born: May 8, 1962 (age 64) Laconia, New Hampshire, U.S.
- Party: Republican
- Education: Salem State University (BA); United States Army War College (MS)

Military service
- Branch: United States Army
- Years of service: 1981–2017
- Rank: Brigadier general
- Commands: Special Operations Command Africa
- Battles: War in Afghanistan; Operation Medusa
- Awards: Defense Superior Service Medal (3); Legion of Merit; Bronze Star (5, with valor); Purple Heart (2)

Donald C. Bolduc (born May 8, 1962) is a retired brigadier general of the United States Army. The Republican nominee in the 2022 U.S. Senate election in New Hampshire, he lost to incumbent Democrat Maggie Hassan. Bolduc was also a Republican candidate for the U.S. Senate in 2020, but did not win the primary. Since 2022, Bolduc has been employed as a police officer in Pittsfield, New Hampshire.

Bolduc has been described by newspapers and wire services as far-right. He initially endorsed the false Stop the Steal conspiracy theory positing that the 2020 U.S. presidential election was rigged to favor Joe Biden. He later stated his belief that the election was not stolen, though claiming that there was still fraud.

== Early life and education ==
Bolduc was born in Laconia, New Hampshire, on May 8, 1962, to Armand A. Bolduc (1939–2018) and Janet Gagne Bolduc (1940–2003). His father was a farmer and served in the National Guard. Bolduc earned a Bachelor of Arts degree from Salem State University in 1989 and a Master of Science in security technologies from the United States Army War College.

== Military career ==
Bolduc served ten tours in Afghanistan, during which he received two Purple Hearts. In 2006, he led the 1st Battalion, 3rd Special Forces Group during Operation Medusa. From 2010 to 2011, he commanded the Combined Joint Special Operations Task Force. From 2012 to 2013, he commanded the Combined Joint Special Operations Component, where he started the Village Stability Operations program. Bolduc suffered a hip injury in a friendly fire incident in 2001. In 2005, it was discovered that he also had a traumatic brain injury (TBI) and post-traumatic stress disorder (PTSD).

== U.S. Senate campaigns ==
In June 2019, Bolduc entered the 2020 United States Senate election in New Hampshire, seeking the Republican nomination to run against incumbent Democratic senator Jeanne Shaheen. He lost the Republican primary to Corky Messner, who was endorsed by then-President Donald Trump. During the election campaign, Bolduc ran a television ad attacking Democrats as "a bunch of liberal, socialist pansies", a remark perceived as being homophobic.

After the 2020 election, Bolduc closely tied himself to Trump. In February 2021, he announced that he would run for Senate again in the 2022 election, hoping to challenge Democratic incumbent Senator Maggie Hassan. In the Republican primary, he ran against Chuck Morse, the New Hampshire State Senate president. Bolduc sought endorsement by Trump, who made no endorsement in the primary but praised Bolduc as a "strong guy, tough guy". On September 14, Bolduc defeated Morse and won the Republican primary election.

=== Accusations against Chris Sununu ===
After Chris Sununu announced in November 2021 that he would seek reelection as governor and would not run for U.S. Senate—an announcement that was viewed as a setback for the Republicans' hopes of winning Hassan's seat—Bolduc gave a conspiracy-filled interview on conservative talk radio in which he denounced Sununu, a fellow Republican, as a "Chinese Communist sympathizer" and claimed that Sununu's business "supports terrorism". Sununu has described Bolduc as "not a serious candidate" and a "conspiracy-theorist extremist"; Sununu endorsed Bolduc's primary rival, Chuck Morse. However, Sununu endorsed Bolduc for the general election.

== Political positions ==
Bolduc was described as far-right during his 2022 Senate run as a Republican candidate.

Bolduc has called for the repeal of the Seventeenth Amendment to the U.S. Constitution, ending direct popular election of U.S. senators. He opposed the provision in the Democrats' Inflation Reduction Act allowing Medicare to negotiate lower prices for prescription drugs, saying, "Anything the government's involved in, it's not good, it doesn't work."

=== 2020 presidential election ===
Bolduc was a 2020 presidential election denier. He endorsed Donald Trump's false claim that the 2020 presidential election was rigged to favor Joe Biden. In May 2021, Bolduc was one of 124 retired generals and admirals who signed an open letter promoting the lie that the presidential election was "rigged" in Biden's favor. Throughout his campaign for the Republican nomination for U.S. Senate, Bolduc continued to promote the false claim that the election was stolen and that Trump actually won; in an August 2022 primary debate, he said of his signing the May 2021 letter: "damn it, I stand by [it]".

In September 2021, Bolduc criticized General Mark Milley, chairman of the Joint Chiefs of Staff, for reportedly telephoning his Chinese counterpart after the January 6, 2021, assault on the U.S. Capitol to assure him of the strategic stability of the United States. Bolduc said of Milley: "I believe his actions are irresponsible and they fall somewhere between treason and dereliction of duty."

Two days after Bolduc won the Republican primary in September 2022, he reversed his stance on the 2020 election: "I have come to the conclusion, and I want to be definitive on this, the election was not stolen." After he lost the Senate election to Hassan in November, Bolduc told The New Yorker, "Joe Biden won. He is the legitimate President of the United States. President Trump should have accepted that."

But Bolduc continued to promote his false claims that the election was marred by fraud. "I went through a learning process on the whole thing and came out the other end to it not being a stolen election but one with irregularities and fraud, like a lot of other people on both sides of the aisle", he said in November.

=== Abortion and fertility medicine ===
Bolduc opposes legal abortion and hailed the Supreme Court decision overturning Roe v. Wade, calling it an occasion to "rejoice". After winning the Republican primary election, Bolduc distanced himself from a 15-week federal abortion ban proposed by Republican Senator Lindsey Graham; Bolduc said abortion should be a "state-level" issue. Bolduc also considers the disposal of embryos for in vitro fertilization "a pretty disgusting practice".

=== COVID-19 pandemic ===
Bolduc has repeated misinformation about COVID-19. He has falsely claimed that COVID-19 vaccines are really "Bill Gates saying we should put [micro]chips inside people" and asserted that the use of face masks to control the spread of the virus "cause[s] more problems than they solve".

=== Donald Trump ===
During both of his Senate campaigns, Bolduc was considered an ally and supporter of Donald Trump. After Trump's defeat in the 2020 United States presidential election, Bolduc supported Trump's false claims of election fraud. However, after winning the primary for the Republican nomination in the 2022 Senate election in New Hampshire, Bolduc disavowed his previous statements about the election. Regardless, Trump endorsed Bolduc for the general election, writing on Truth Social that "His opponent is a disaster on Crime, the Border, Inflation, & all else. Vote for Don Bolduc!", although he also criticized Bolduc for changing his stance on election denial.

By the 2024 Republican Party presidential primaries, Bolduc disavowed Trump, and campaigned for his opponent, former U.N. Ambassador Nikki Haley. Bolduc criticized Trump in a press conference for his draft deferments in the Vietnam War (which Trump had received due to bone spurs, which Bolduc claimed he had while going through Ranger School) and other military issues. He also appeared in an advertisement for the Haley campaign.

=== Foreign policy ===
In a February 2021 op-ed in USA Today, Bolduc criticized the Afghanistan Study Group's recommendation to reverse the scheduled withdrawal of U.S. military forces from Afghanistan. Bolduc urged the Biden administration to stick with the withdrawal deadline as set by the Trump administration.

=== Litter boxes in schools ===
Speaking to an audience in North Hampton, New Hampshire, on October 27, 2022, Bolduc repeated the debunked hoax that children are being told they can identify as cats and use litter boxes in schools. Pinkerton Academy and the Dover School District released statements refuting Bolduc's claim, calling his allegations "entirely untrue".

=== Marijuana legalization ===
Bolduc is opposed to the legalization of marijuana, and considers it to be a gateway drug and a risk to public safety. In a July 2020 interview with WMUR-TV, Bolduc stated that "My big problem with marijuana is that it could be an entry drug and a gateway for our children. And I don't not want our children to be introduced to drugs. We have a big enough drug problem here, which nobody has really done anything about," and "when you get in a motor vehicle and you drive [under the influence of marijuana], your sobriety is impaired, and that is very, very dangerous. And until we get controls or some sort of system and technology in place for our police to be able to test sobriety of people that that are operating under the influence of marijuana, this is a public safety issue."

== Personal life ==
Bolduc lives in Stratham, New Hampshire, with his wife Sharon. They have three sons: Joshua, Matthew, and Zachary.

Bolduc was hired as a police officer in Pittsfield, New Hampshire, in 2022, initially in a part-time role, and then as a full-time patrol officer.

Party political offices
Preceded by Kelly Ayotte	Republican nominee for U.S. Senator from New Hampshire (Class 3); 2022	Most recent
