= Cornerstone Policy Research =

American think tank

Cornerstone Policy Research Cornerstone Action
- Abbreviation: CPR
- Formation: 2000
- Type: Public policy think tank
- Location: Concord, New Hampshire
- Executive Director: Kevin H. Smith
- Revenue: $56,667 (2015)
- Expenses: $57,813 (2015)
- Website: www.nhcornerstone.org

Cornerstone Policy Research and its legislative action arm Cornerstone Action are a conservative think tank headquartered and primarily active in the U.S. state of New Hampshire. The organization describes itself as "dedicated to the preservation of strong families, limited government and free markets". It is a Family Policy Council, the state affiliate of Focus on the Family for New Hampshire.

CPR was founded by Karen Testerman, the organization's first Executive Director, Shannon McGinley, current chairwoman of the board, and others in 2000. Kevin H. Smith, a former New Hampshire state legislator, became the second Executive Director in 2009 and resigned to pursue public office in October 2011. As of February 2012 the Cornerstone web site lists Wendy P. Warcholik as the organization's Executive Director.

In addition to the Executive Directors in recent years Ellen Kolb, the organization's legislative policy director, has spoken for CPR and Cornerstone Action.

The organization has sponsored a number of events in New Hampshire such as a state conservative summit at the New Hampshire Institute of Politics in 2009 and a debate amongst the Republican Primary candidates for the U.S. Senate seat in 2010. CPR holds an annual dinner event as well.

Fergus Cullen, a former director of the New Hampshire Republican Party, referred to Cornerstone Action as "New Hampshire's best-organized advocacy group on the right".

== Political issues ==
In 2004 then-Executive-Director Karen Testerman wrote in an article entitled "Promiscuous Plague" that sexually transmitted diseases are "encouraged by a message of 'safe sex' and an adult population that acts as if self-control and traditional morality are outdated and without value."

Karen Testerman spoke against civil unions in New Hampshire, calling gays and lesbians a "special interest group". She indicated that due to the incidence of AIDS and other sexually transmitted diseases amongst the gay population civil unions "could promote the acceptance of a behavior that is jeopardizing the health of our children." She went on to say, "Multiple partners when you're doing something unnatural—it's just not good." In 2009 CPR under Kevin Smith worked in opposition to the legalization of same-sex marriage in New Hampshire, efforts which included telephoning thousands of constituents in key districts. Cornerstone opposed a New Hampshire bill that would have extended anti-discrimination protections to transgender individuals.

In 2009 CPR urged the New Hampshire Department of Education to adopt a resolution for the removal of controversial federal Assistant Deputy Secretary of Education Kevin Jennings. Also in 2009, Cornerstone opposed a 2009 bill in the New Hampshire legislature that would have legalized assisted suicide. Ellen Kolb called the bill "a recipe for elder abuse". CPR also opposed the 2009 effort to legalize medical marijuana in New Hampshire. The organization participated in a 2009 protest at one of Barack Obama's "town hall" events on the topic of health care reform. In 2010 Kevin Smith asserted that the health insurance mandate of the Patient Protection and Affordable Care Act is unconstitutional.

In 2010 Kevin Smith spoke in opposition to legislative action in New Hampshire to repeal a law making adultery a criminal offense. After passage of the law CPR sought to amend the repeal measure to specify that adultery was still a civil offense and grounds for divorce.
