= Kevin H. Smith =

American politician (born 1977)

Kevin Smith
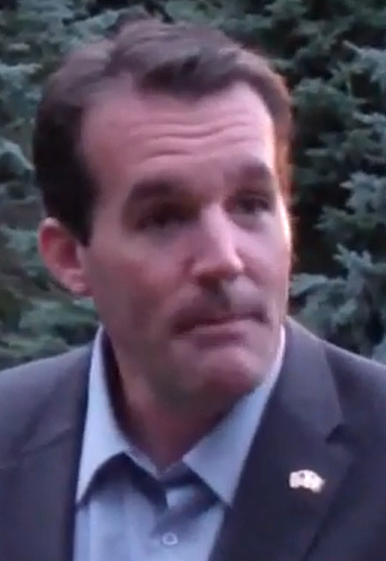

Member of the New Hampshire House of Representatives from the 29th Rockingham district
- In office December 4, 1996 – December 2, 1998
- Preceded by: Multi-member district
- Succeeded by: Multi-member district

Personal details
- Born: July 28, 1977 (age 49) Winchester, Massachusetts, U.S.
- Party: Republican
- Spouse: Suzy Fawcett
- Children: 3
- Education: University of New Hampshire, Manchester (BA)
- Website: Campaign website

Kevin H. Smith (born on July 28, 1977) is an American politician who was a candidate for the Republican nomination in the 2022 United States Senate election in New Hampshire. Smith is a former state representative and previously served as the town manager of Londonderry, New Hampshire. Smith previously ran the conservative advocacy organization Cornerstone, and served on the staffs of United States Senator Bob Smith, and former New Hampshire Governor Craig Benson. Smith also served as the Deputy Director for New Hampshire’s Division for Juvenile Justice.

== Professional career ==
=== State legislature ===
Smith served as a state representative from Londonderry, NH to the New Hampshire House of Representatives from 1996–98, where he served on the Judiciary and Family Law Committee.

In 1997 he spoke for the members of the Committee opposed to SB 34, an act repealing statutes that required prison terms and fines for physicians who performed abortions and repealing a statute that mandated a charge of murder against physicians whose patients died in the course of an abortion procedure. He stated that passage of the bill and consequent repeal of those laws might cause New Hampshire to "become the abortion mecca of the country" and referred to it as an "extreme measure". The bill passed the legislature and was signed into law by then-governor Jeanne Shaheen, decriminalizing those activities for physicians.

In 1997 he authored HB 768, a bill banning partial birth abortion which was defeated in the House. In that year he also voted in favor of Right-to-work legislation. In 1998 he was awarded the Christian Coalition's "Pro-Family" House Member of the Year.

During his time of service in the legislature, Smith was the director of a before and after-school child care program and also worked as an elementary school para-professional, assisting students with special needs.

=== Political and governmental work ===
He served on the official staffs for both former United States Senator Bob Smith (no relation) and New Hampshire Governor Craig Benson. Smith had also served as the New Hampshire campaign field director for Senator Smith's unsuccessful bid for the Republican presidential nomination in 1999.

During his time as a U.S. Senate staffer, Smith was the outreach liaison to New Hampshire's law enforcement and public safety community, as well as a caseworker where he assisted New Hampshire's citizens on a variety of matters such as veteran's affairs, social security, and immigration.

While serving on the Governor's staff, Smith was the Governor's liaison to the Executive Branch Department Heads as well as New Hampshire's Executive Council, where Smith assisted with appointments to Executive Branch Boards, Commissions, and Departments. Smith also served on the Interagency Commission to End Homelessness during his time in the Governor's Office although he has said that he considers it a tragedy when "government steps in the role of charitable organizations, of faith-based organizations, of community organizations that do such a great job of helping out people in the community. They've basically outsourced all of the roles that churches and charities used to do to the government and that's a real shame. We need to get back to looking at our community organizations as a first line of defense and not the government."

=== Division for Juvenile Justice Services ===
In 2005, Smith joined the New Hampshire Division of Juvenile Justice Services where he became Assistant Director of the Department in 2007. During his tenure, Kevin oversaw the Finance and Quality Assurance departments and helped develop the Division's first "report card" which measured the results and efficacy of various programs within the Division. Kevin was also a member of the New Hampshire Chiefs of Police and worked closely with law enforcement and District Court judges on matters such as developing alternatives to juvenile detention and reducing the incidence of disproportionate minority contact in urban areas. Kevin also worked closely with the Commissioner of Health and Human Services to develop the state's first Office of Faith-based and Community Programs as a means to find local, community and private-sector solutions to meet the needs of New Hampshire's most vulnerable citizens when state resources were not available.

=== Cornerstone ===
In 2009, Smith became Executive Director of Cornerstone Action, a non-partisan, conservative advocacy organization dedicated to the advancement of free-enterprise, limited government, and personal responsibility policies in the state legislature.

During the three years of his executive directorship the organization's membership increased from 2,000 to 8,000. Under Smith, Cornerstone Action's revenue increased ten-fold to a high of $1.2 million in 2010 during his tenure. Cornerstone grew into "a key player in State House debate on fiscal and social issues."

For his efforts, Smith has been recognized by national and local media as being one of the most influential conservatives in New Hampshire and in 2011, was named by Business NH Magazine as one of New Hampshire's "10 Most Powerful People."

=== 2012 campaign ===
Smith resigned as an Executive Director of Cornerstone in October 2011 to run as a Republican candidate in the 2012 New Hampshire gubernatorial election. He lost in the primary, receiving approximately 30% of the vote to Ovide Lamontagne's 68%.

=== Town manager ===
After a year-long search, Smith was appointed Town Manager of Londonderry NH in August 2013. The Town Manager position is responsible for the proper administration of all departments of town government, except the Library Division. In this capacity, Smith was responsible for proposing and executing the town's budget. Smith was particularly focused on growing the Londonderry economic base, expanding the town's infrastructure for an industrially zoned area yielded particularly strong results.

Under Smith's tenure as town manager of Londonderry, one of the State's larger communities, Smith brought in more than $250 million in new commercial and industrial value as the town's head of Economic Development. The town’s overall value increased by $2.2 billion as the town became the fastest growing community for economic development in New Hampshire. Londonderry also saw a decrease in the municipal tax rate to a 40-year low and $11 million in budget surpluses have been returned to taxpayers. Smith oversaw the construction of a new $5.5 million Central Fire Station. In 2022, Smith resigned as town manager prior to announcing his candidacy for the Republican nomination for U.S. Senate in the 2022 New Hampshire U.S. Senate election.

== Personal life ==
Smith was born in Winchester, Massachusetts, to Bruce and Denise Smith. He moved to New Hampshire when his family moved to Londonderry in 1986. A graduate of Londonderry High School and the University of New Hampshire at Manchester, Smith was appointed to the New Hampshire Advisory Committee to the US Commission on Civil Rights in 2009 and continues to serve on the committee. He is currently the president of Smith Enterprises, a government and public relations consulting group.

Smith currently resides in Londonderry with his wife, Suzy Fawcett Smith, and their three children.

== Views on issues ==
=== Tax issues ===
Smith has made The Pledge to veto any state sales or income taxes.

=== Education reform ===
Smith has stated that he believes that the public school system is still based upon a 1950s model and needs to be reformed and that the government should issue educational vouchers that would provide tax revenue to private schools, enabling parents to more affordably send their children to private schools. However he says that speaking as a product of public schools himself and because most children are educated within the public school system, we can't give up on that system. He has also spoken in favor of grade retention, saying "we shouldn't move kids up the chain until they reach their grade level."

==== Education funding ====
In the context of the ongoing school funding issues of New Hampshire, Smith says that he agrees with current Governor John Lynch that there should be a constitutional amendment allowing the state to target aid to the neediest communities but believes that it is a notable failure of leadership that the Governor has not delivered this solution as he promised in his 2004 campaign.

=== Death penalty ===
Although not always in favor of it, Smith said that he has "evolved" and is currently endorses the death penalty for some crimes.

=== Health and Human Services ===
Smith has said that there is a problem with corruption in the New Hampshire Department of Health & Human Services and when asked how it should be addressed he said, "You need to have competent people to do the job."

=== Second Amendment issues ===
New Hampshire law requires a license to carry a loaded firearm in both open or concealed fashion while in a motor vehicle but no license is needed to openly carry a loaded weapon while on foot. Regarding the carrying of firearms in public, Smith said in early 2012 that he is "on the fence, but leaning toward keeping the law the way it is."

=== Federal funding for abortion ===
In addition to Smith's activity regarding abortion while serving in the legislature, he has said that "People don't want public funding for abortion clinics. It's an issue that cuts across party lines."

=== Infrastructure ===
Smith has stated that the most important transportation issue currently is the expansion and widening of Interstate 93. Regarding establishment of commuter rail service to connect Southern New Hampshire with the Boston-area rail system he says that studies he has read indicate that expected ridership levels would be insufficient to support profitability and that hence along with the other expenses involved he does not believe that New Hampshire can afford such an endeavor at the present time, however this is not an absolute position and he would be willing to listen to the arguments of rail advocates.
