= Derwood Shuty =

Shuty V4 MP-1
- Type: Semi-automatic pistol
- Place of origin: United States

Production history
- Designer: Darren "Derwood" Booth
- Designed: 2016

Specifications
- Cartridge: 9×19mm Parabellum
- Action: Closed bolt simple blowback
- Feed system: Glock 17 compatible magazine or custom 3D printed magazine

Shuty is a series of 3D printed firearms created by Darren "Derwood" Booth, a West Virginia carpenter. The Shuty is a semi-automatic pistol that is mostly 3D printed, but requires some factory-made gun parts. It is chambered in 9×19mm Parabellum.

== Design ==
The Shuty V4 MP-1 pistol uses a closed bolt simple blowback action like the Heckler & Koch UMP. The lower and upper receiver are 3D printed, a Glock barrel, metal hammer, metal firing pin and screws and bolts from the hardware store are used. The AP-9 has a buffer tube sticking out of its back which houses the action similar to an AR-15. None of the components require registration in the US, making it a privately made firearm.

== Variants ==
| Name | Date made public | Designer |
|---|---|---|
| Shuty V2 | May 2015 | Derwood |
| Shuty V4 MP-1 | January 2016 | Derwood |
| Shuty V4 MP-1 | "95% 3D printed" semi-automatic pistol.; Metal parts include the bolt, barrel, hammer, firing pin, springs, and ordinary fasteners. | |
| Shuty AP-9 | April 2017 | Derwood |
| Shuty AP-9 | A successor to the Shuty MP-1 | |
| FGC-9 | March 27, 2020 (MKI); April 16, 2021 (MKII) | JStark1809 (DetDisp) |
| FGC-9 | Based on Shuty AP-9.; No parts kit required: barrel can be rifled via Electrochemical machining (ECM), instructions in metric, meant surpass European gun restrictions | |
| Shuty WTF-9 | May 2020 | Derwood |
| Shuty WTF-9 | Stands for WeighT Forward (Bolt) in 9×19mm: Developed from AP-9; Bolt weight is placed forward which results in the firearms having no buffer tube, unlike the AP-9 | |
| MOD-9 | June 2021 | Derwood |
| MOD-9 | Developed from WTF-9; 3 versions released; V2 can use alternate magwell for Beretta 92 magazines | |
| MOD-9 Bullpup | February 2021 or earlier | Mussy |
| MOD-9 Bullpup | Uses pull rod instead of push rod unlike many bullpups; Released in all 3 versions | |

== See also ==
- List of notable 3D printed weapons and parts
- Privately made firearm
