= Odysee =

Decentralized video hosting platform

- Website type: Online video platform
- Founded: December 2020; 5 years ago
- Headquarters: Las Vegas, Nevada, U.S.
- Country of origin: United States
- Founder: Julian Chandra
- Key people: Julian Chandra and Jeremy Kauffman
- Revenue: $10.7 million
- Website: www.odysee.com
- Current status: Active

Odysee is an American video hosting platform which uses a combination of decentralized servers and the LBRY blockchain. The service was created in December 2020. The site is based on a broad interpretation of the concept of freedom of speech.

== History ==
Odysee was founded in 2020 by Julian Chandra with the involvement of LBRY founder Jeremy Kauffman. At launch, the company described itself as an alternative to mainstream services like YouTube, but with a focus on freedom of speech and decentralization.

In June 2024, Odysee was acquired by Forward Research. The acquisition took place after Odysee's former parent company LBRY lost a lawsuit from the U.S. Securities and Exchange Commission in July 2023.

== Technology ==
Logo of the LBC cryptocurrency

Odysee enables users to upload, share, and monetize videos through cryptocurrency. Videos on the platform are uploaded to a peer-to-peer network where they can then be shared. The metadata of uploaded content is stored on the blockchain, while the videos themselves are hosted across a distributed network of users, referred to as nodes.

== Moderation ==
According to a press release from Odysee, it was created to prevent deplatforming of users. Since its launch in September 2020, Odysee's specific moderation policies and decentralized structure have allowed hate speech and misinformation to be spread on the platform. This has included far-right groups, conspiracy theorists, and individuals deplatformed or banned elsewhere. Its moderation policy and philosophy has an explicitly broad interpretation of freedom of speech.

In addition to hosting hate speech, Odysee has also hosted disinformation, particularly around topics such as COVID-19, vaccines, and political conspiracy theories. The platform's decentralized nature makes it difficult for content to be effectively moderated or removed, allowing disinformation to spread.

Because it also hosts non-video filetypes, Odysee has become the home for many 3D-printed firearm files. The platform's lax moderation allows the sharing and distribution of some potentially restricted items, like high-capacity magazines and auto sears.

Odysee has faced geo-blocking restrictions in regions such as the European Union, where governments have raised concerns about content deemed harmful or disinforming.

== Criticism and controversies ==
Due to its lack of moderation, the platform hosts videos from users who have been deplatformed from mainstream sites such as YouTube. Content hosted on the site has included misinformation, hate speech, and conspiracy theories. The platform has allowed neo-Nazis and other hate groups to fundraise via cryptocurrency. Non-video content hosted by the platform includes files for 3D-printed firearms.

The website has been banned in the United Arab Emirates.

== See also ==
- Online video platform
- Comparison of video hosting services
- List of online video platforms
