= LBRY =

Blockchain-based file-sharing and payment network

- Developers: LBRY Foundation; LBRY, Inc.; Odysee, Inc.
- Stable release: 0.17.3.3 / April 30, 2021; 5 years ago
- Written in: C++
- Platform: Windows, macOS, Linux, Android, iOS
- Type: Protocol, distributed file system, content delivery network
- License: MIT License
- Website: lbry.org
- Repository: github.com/lbryfoundation

LBRY (pronounced "library") is a blockchain-based file-sharing and payment network that is primarily used for social networks and video platforms.

The blockchain was managed by LBRY, Inc. from 2015 until 2023, when the company closed after losing a lawsuit from the U.S. Securities and Exchange Commission which found that LBRY had sold unregistered securities. In September 2020, the video hosting platform Odysee was created as part of the LBRY project. It was split into a separate company on October 1, 2021. LBRY, Inc.'s CEO was American libertarian political activist Jeremy Kauffman.

== History ==
The LBRY protocol is a decentralized file-sharing and payment network built using blockchain and BitTorrent technology. It allows anyone to create an account and register content that cannot be deleted by the company. LBRY uses BitTorrent technology to serve content without relying on their own servers by using peer-to-peer file-sharing. Creators can record video content to the LBRY blockchain, as well as other digital content including music, images, podcasts, and e-books. The LBRY projects are open source.

In October 2017, LBRY, Inc. released a media hosting site built atop the protocol called spee.ch. It stopped being supported in December 2019, in favor of LBRY, Inc.'s LBRY.tv website. Odysee, another video website, using their LBRY protocol, entered beta in September 2020 and officially launched that December. Odysee was split into a separate corporate entity with its own CEO on October 1, 2021 as LBRY faced a lawsuit from the U.S. Securities and Exchange Commission (SEC).

=== Company ===
LBRY, Inc.
- Founded: 2015; 11 years ago
- Founders: Jeremy Kauffman; Jimmy Kiselak; Alex Grintsvayg; Mike Vine; Josh Finer
- Defunct: 2023; 3 years ago
- Headquarters: Manchester, New Hampshire, United States
- Key people: Jeremy Kauffman (CEO); Alex Grintsvayg (CTO)
- Website: lbry.com

LBRY, Inc., which built the LBRY protocol and the platform based upon it, was founded in May 2015 by Jeremy Kauffman and Jimmy Kiselak. The company was based in Manchester, New Hampshire.

Through 2015 and 2016, Kauffman and Kiselak were joined by Mike Vine, Josh Finer, and Alex Grintsvayg, who they also described as co-founders. Kauffman, Kiselak, and Grintsvayg all attended Rensselaer Polytechnic Institute, where they played ultimate frisbee together. Kauffman was LBRY's chief executive officer, Grintsvayg was chief technology officer, and Finer was the director of operations and analytics. Julian Chandra was the company's chief marketing officer.

LBRY, Inc. maintained their own cryptocurrency, "LBRY credits" (LBC), which they used as a part of a digital store they built on the LBRY blockchain. Using this currency, creators could charge viewers to stream their content or earn tips. Users of the platform earned LBC by using the platform and inviting others to it. On March 29, 2021, the SEC charged LBRY, Inc. with selling unregistered digital asset securities. The SEC alleged that LBRY, Inc. had sold LBRY credits (LBC) to fund their work without registering them with the SEC as a security, a violation of securities laws. In response, LBRY's CEO began a public relations campaign to gather support among blockchain and cryptocurrency enthusiasts, and to argue that the SEC had mislabeled LBC as a security. On November 7, 2022, the SEC won the lawsuit when Judge Paul Barbadoro of the United States District Court for the District of New Hampshire granted the SEC's motion for summary judgment. Although the SEC initially sought a $22 million fine, they later revised the request to $111,614, citing LBRY's "lack of funds and near-defunct status". In July 2023, the judge imposed the fine, and LBRY announced they would be closing.

== Content and users ==
The LBRY platform's video sharing websites have been described as an alternative to YouTube. In 2017, LBRY, Inc. publicly archived 20,000 deleted UC Berkeley lectures from the university's YouTube channel after the US Department of Justice ruled that the videos violated the Americans with Disabilities Act due to a lack of transcription. spee.ch, a media hosting site built atop the LBRY protocol, was used by groups such as Deterrence Dispensed to upload 3D printed firearm blueprints. When LBRY, Inc. stopped supporting spee.ch in 2019 in favor of their new site, LBRY.tv, Deterrence Dispensed moved to LBRY.tv.

The LBRY platform experienced a surge in popularity in late 2020 and early 2021, and LBRY, Inc. said in January 2021 that their new user sign-ups had increased to 250% from the previous month. Writing for The New York Times, Nathaniel Popper reported that many of the new users appeared to be supporters of former United States president Donald Trump and gun rights advocates who were suspended from YouTube. Robert Hackett and David Z. Morris writing for Fortune attributed the increased interest in LBRY and other blockchain-based platforms to the choice by Twitter and other popular social networks to ban Trump and many others after the 2021 United States Capitol attack.

As of April 2021, Odysee hosted 10 million videos, the most-viewed of which was a video challenging the safety of COVID-19 vaccines. A May 2021 report by The Guardian found "scores of extremist videos" on the Odysee platform that promoted antisemitic conspiracy theories, glorified Adolf Hitler and other Nazis, shared COVID-19 misinformation, and depicted meetings and rallies by extremist groups including the white nationalist and antisemitic National Justice party and the neo-Nazi Nordic Resistance Movement.

Megan Squire, a computer scientist and researcher of right-wing political extremism, described challenges faced by blockchains such as LBRY and the social networks built atop them: "As a technology it is very cool, but you can't just sit there and be a Pollyanna and think that all information will be free ... There will be racists, and people will shoot each other. It's going to be the total package." Extremism researcher Eviane Leidig, writing for the Global Network on Extremism & Technology (GNET) at The International Centre for the Study of Radicalisation and Political Violence, described Odysee as "the new YouTube for the far-right", and wrote that although Odysee was "not inherently a platform for far-right or extremist content creators", it had become popular among them.

== Moderation ==
Because the LBRY network is built on a blockchain, there is no way for LBRY, Inc. to moderate at the blockchain level their users or the content that they upload. LBRY, Inc. is able to moderate content on the websites they build on top of the protocol. On LBRY's Odysee platform, guidelines prohibit content including pornography and promotion of violence or terrorism. Rule-breaking content can be delisted from Odysee, which leaves the channel and content in place and continues to allow it to be shared, but prevents it from being found via search or browsing channels. Most people access the protocol through websites including Odysee and LBRY.tv which are built on top of the LBRY blockchain.

Todd Bookman writing for New Hampshire Public Radio described Odysee's approach to content moderation as "no censorship, no-deplatforming, no matter what users say". When asked in July 2019 about the use of LBRY, Inc.'s sites to host blueprints for 3D-printed guns, LBRY, Inc.'s CEO Kauffman has said that he would only remove the files from his websites if courts deem them illegal. Champe Barton writing for The Trace has said Kauffman "signal[ed] his support" for the distribution of such blueprints by sharing them on his personal Twitter account. On May 14, 2021, The Guardian reported that LBRY executive Julian Chandra wrote to Odysee site moderators that a "Nazi that makes videos about the superiority of the white race" was not grounds for removal from Odysee. The e-mail was accidentally sent to a user who had complained about neo-Nazi content on the platform.

== See also ==
- Comparison of video hosting services
- List of online video platforms
- Odysee
