= M2 Hyde =

U.S. Submachine gun, Caliber .45, M2
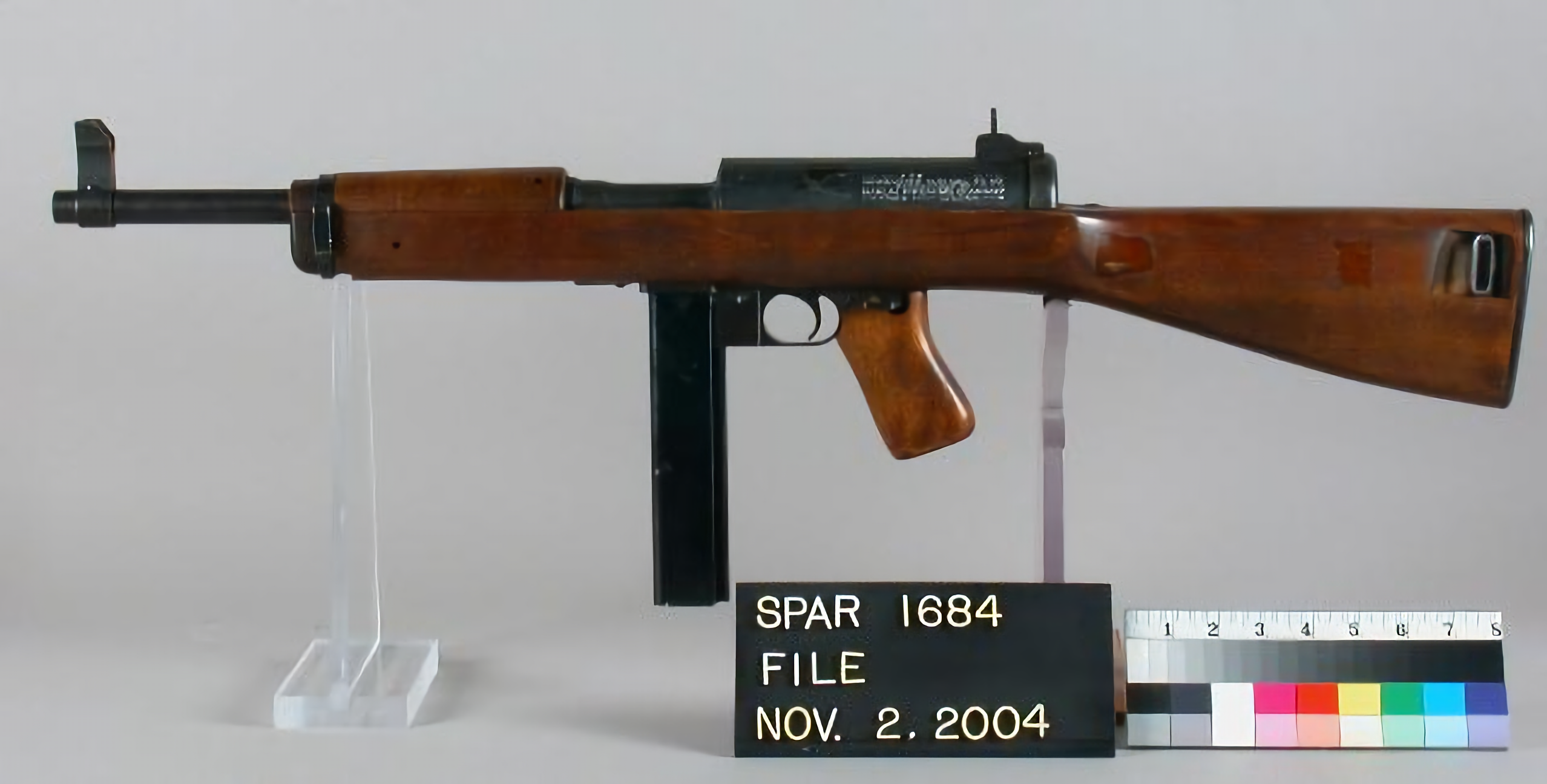
- M2 Hyde SMG
- Type: Submachine Gun
- Place of origin: United States

Service history
- Wars: World War II

Production history
- Designer: George Hyde, Frederick Sampson
- Manufacturer: Marlin Firearms
- Produced: 1942–1943

Specifications
- Mass: 9 lb 4 0z (4.19 kg)
- Length: 32 in. (813 mm)
- Barrel length: 12 in. (305 mm)
- Caliber: .45 ACP
- Action: Blowback
- Rate of fire: 570 rounds per minute
- Muzzle velocity: 960 ft/s (292 m/s)
- Feed system: 20 or 30-round Thompson submachine gun box magazines

The Hyde-Inland M2 was a United States submachine gun design submitted for trials at Aberdeen Proving Ground in February 1941. Work was undertaken by General Motors Inland Manufacturing Division to develop workable prototypes of George Hyde's design patented in 1935 (U.S. patent 2049776A). The model first submitted for trials in April 1942 was designated the Hyde-Inland 1. Trials revealed the design was superior to the M1 submachine gun in mud and dirt tests, and its accuracy in full-automatic firing was better than any other submachine gun tested at the time. An improved Hyde-Inland 2 was designated U.S. Submachine gun, Caliber .45, M2 as a substitute standard for the M1 Thompson in April 1942. As Inland's manufacturing capacity became focused on M1 carbine production, the US Army contracted M2 production to Marlin Firearms in July 1942. Marlin began production in May 1943. Marlin's production failed to match the trials prototype performance; and Marlin's original contract for 164,450 M2s was canceled in 1943 upon adoption of the M3 submachine gun. The M2 is chambered for the .45 ACP cartridge and used the same 20- or 30-round magazine as the Thompson. Its cyclic rate of fire is 570 rounds per minute. None of the approximately 400 manufactured were issued by any branches of the United States military.

== Design ==
The M2 is a simple blowback operated design, although it was difficult to make. The receiver was built from a steel forging and a seamless tubular section, which took extra time and effort to machine and finish, causing the US Army to adopt the M3 with a simple stamped sheet metal receiver instead. Like the American Thompson and Finnish Suomi designs, the M2 bolt was shaped with large diameter rear and slender front sections. Unlike the all metal M3 with a collapsing wire stock, the M2 had a fixed wooden stock with wooden handgrip and handguard.

== See also ==
- List of U.S. Army weapons by supply catalog designation SNL A-52
- List of individual weapons of the U.S. Armed Forces
- M3 submachine gun
- United Defense M42
