= George Hyde (gun designer) =

German-born American machinist and gunsmith

George J. Hyde
- Born: January 4, 1888; Opfingen, Grand Duchy of Baden, German Empire
- Died: December 2, 1963 (aged 75); Brooklyn, New York, U.S.
- Occupations: Machinist, gunsmith and gun designer
- Known for: Submachine gun and pistol designs

George J. Hyde Sr. (born Georg Heide; January 4, 1888 – December 2, 1963) was a German-born American machinist, gunsmith and gun designer best known for designing the M3 submachine gun, better known as the "Grease Gun", as well as the FP-45 Liberator pistol.

Born in Opfingen, a village now part of Freiburg, Germany, Hyde worked as a machinist and designed weapons for the German Empire during World War I. He immigrated to the United States in 1926, with his family following the next year. Before 1935 George J. Hyde was a machinist and shop foreman at Griffin & Howe. He quit Griffin & Howe and went on to become the co-owner of Leonard & Hyde in New York. He partnered with Samuel A. "Harry" Leonard, an expert shotgun and rifle stock maker, who had trained at James Purdey & Sons of London. Hyde also did contract gunsmithing work for Roberts and Kimball in Woburn, Massachusetts. (The latter was an early semi-custom maker of rifles chambered in .257 Roberts.)

== Hyde's gun designs ==
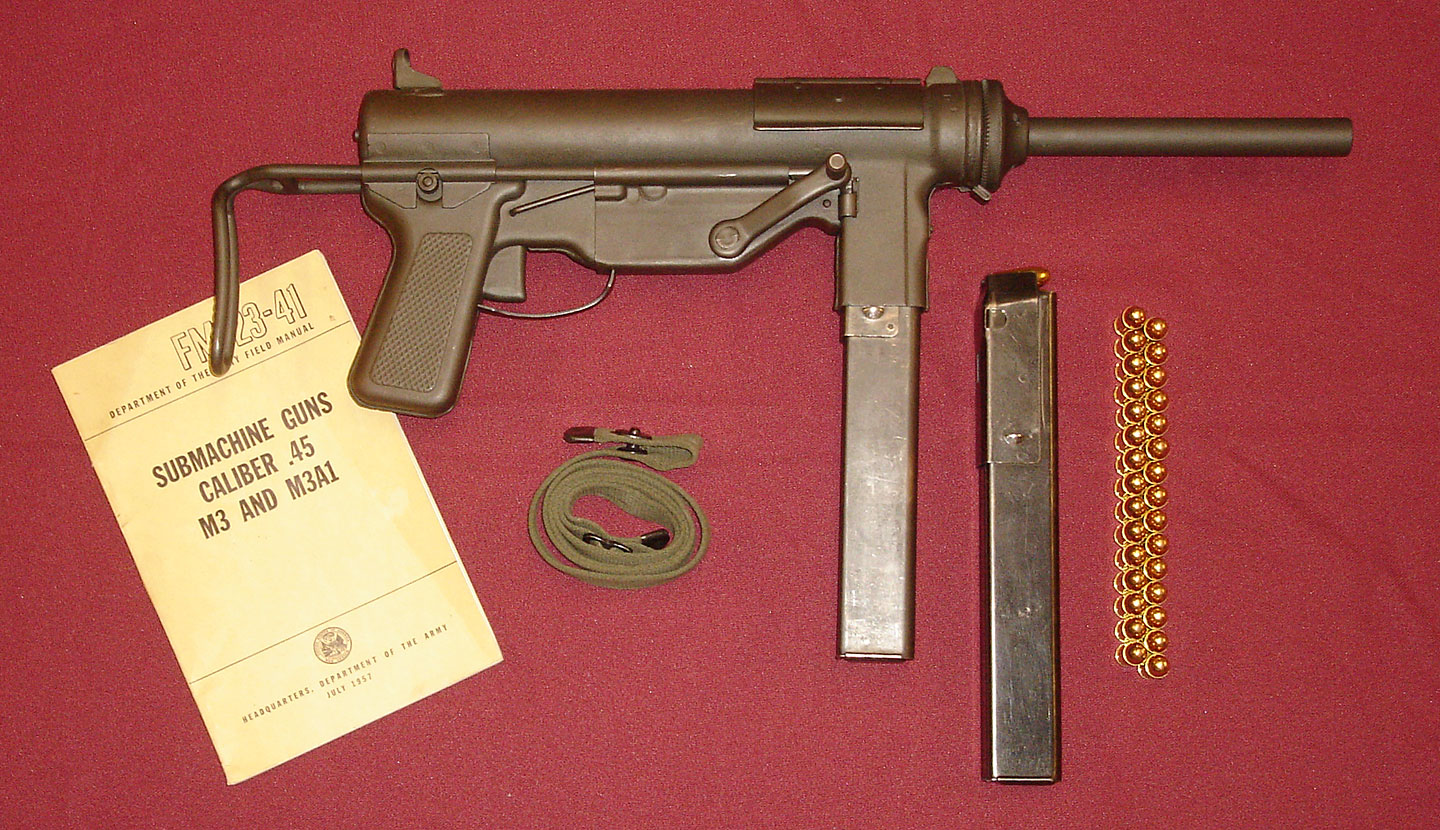
An M3 Grease Gun

Hyde was the chief gun designer for the Inland Division of General Motors (GM) during World War II. He also did gun design work for Bendix Aviation Corporation. Among others, he was the designer or co-designer of these guns:

- The Hyde Model 33, a prototype submachine gun.
- The Hyde Model 35, a prototype submachine gun. A patent was issued to Hyde for this model on August 4, 1936.
- The M2 Hyde submachine gun.
- The M3 grease gun submachine gun. About 700,000 were produced at a unit cost of around $20 each.
- The FP-45 Liberator pistol. About 1,000,000 were produced at a unit cost of $2.10 each.
- The Bendix Hyde carbine. (A prototype he designed for Bendix Aviation Corporation that never went into production.)

== Personal life and death ==
Hyde was married in Germany about 1917, to German-born Margaretta ("Greta") Levy (1895–1985). Their first child was George J. Hyde Jr., born 9 March 1918 in Germany. He died in 1999 in Florida. They also had a daughter, Giselle, born about 1924 in Germany.

George Sr. died on December 2, 1963, at Adelphi Hospital in Brooklyn, New York.
