= FP45 =

FP45 may refer to:

- The FP-45 Liberator, a pistol manufactured for the United States military during World War II
- The EMD FP45, a type of locomotive produced in the United States
