= Bendix Hyde carbine =

Bendix Hyde Carbine
- Type: Assault rifle
- Place of origin: United States

Production history
- Designed: 1941
- Manufacturer: Bendix Aviation Corporation; Inland

Specifications
- Cartridge: .30 Carbine
- Caliber: 7.62mm
- Action: Gas Operated
- Feed system: 20 round box magazines
- Sights: Iron

The Bendix Hyde Carbine is a light rifle concept made by George Hyde, while he was the chief gun designer for the Inland Division of General Motors during World War II. The weapon design is similar to that of the Thompson submachine gun, except that it is gas operated.
