= Jungle style =

Method of carrying ammunition

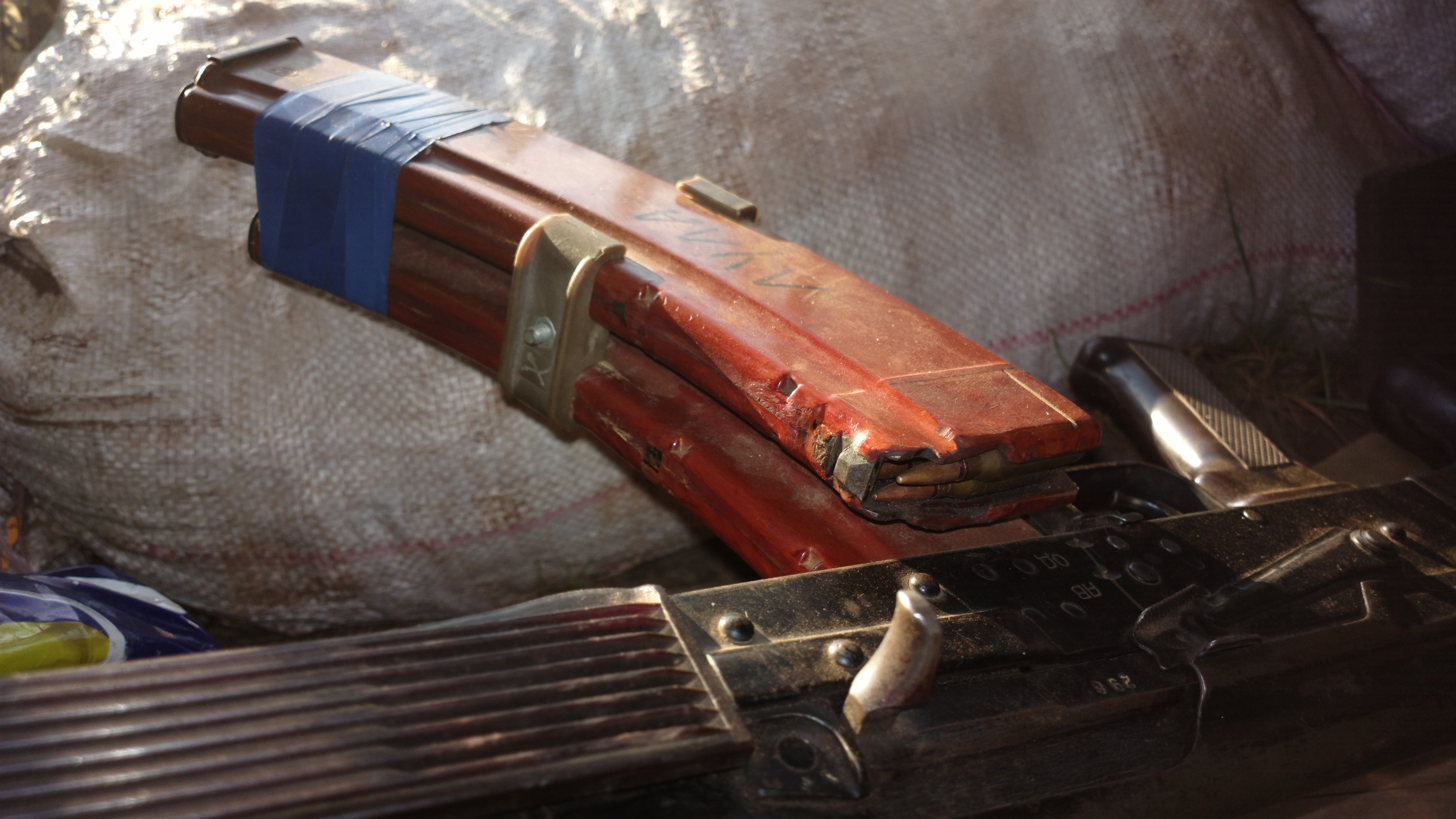
RPK-74 magazines attached jungle style with tape and a magazine coupler

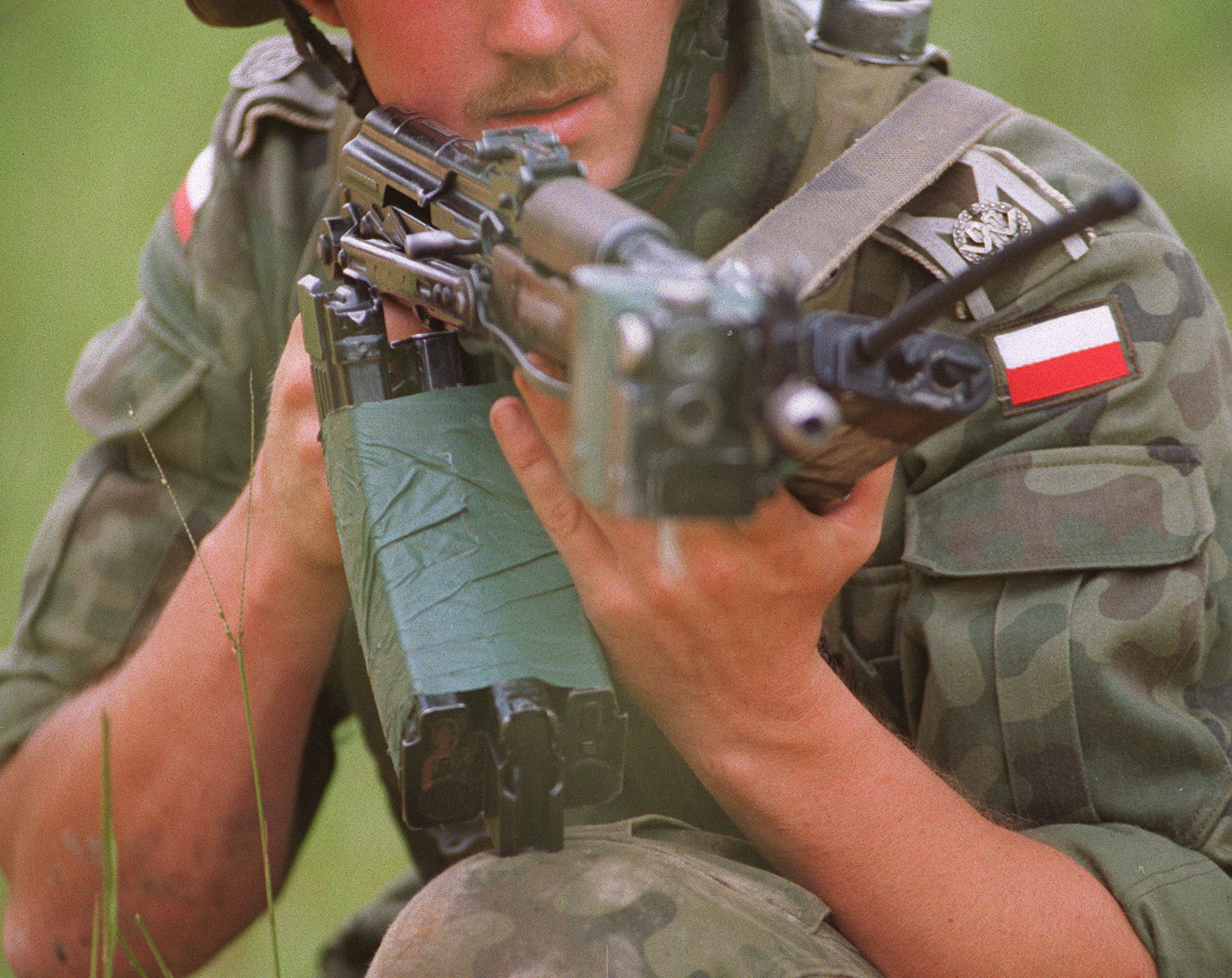
AKMS assault rifle with three magazines taped together. Central magazine is inverted to keep the feeding lips free.

Jungle style magazines, jungle magazines, or coupled magazines are detachable box magazines that are fixed together side by side, for example, with tape, or purpose-made magazine clamps, also called magazine couplers. The spare magazine may be pointing downwards in relation to the one fitted to the weapon, to keep the feeding lips clear for insertion into the weapon.

This configuration is used to speed up reloading, since a loaded magazine is attached to the one in use. Disadvantages include an increased risk of stoppages due to the exposure of the rounds and magazine lips to dirt (particularly if the second magazine is inverted), possible loss of ammunition, and the extra length of two magazines together can raise a soldier's profile in the prone position.

To counter these drawbacks, some manufacturers (such as SIG and Heckler & Koch) have designed magazines with studs and cradles that permit extra ammunition to be carried in parallel, mated in an upright position, without the need for tape or clamps.

== History ==
The practice of "jungle style" magazines originated in World War II for the M1 carbine, M3 "Grease Gun", and Thompson submachine gun. Audie Murphy, one of the most decorated American combat soldiers of World War II, was reported to have utilized taped M1 carbine magazines.

Thompson submachine gun users frequently taped two 20-round magazines together to speed reloads and compensate for the limited capacity. This spurred the official development of the 30-round Thompson magazine, which included an experiment welding two 20-round magazines face-to-face (dropped in favor of the 30-round magazine). The United Defense M42 submachine gun was occasionally issued with two 25-round magazines welded face-to-face.

Taping magazines together to speed up reloading became so common among troops using the M1 Carbine that the U.S. military experimented with the "Holder, Magazine T3-A1", which came to be referred to by some infantrymen as the "Jungle Clip". This metal clamp holds two M1 Carbine 30-round magazines together without tape.

== Image gallery ==
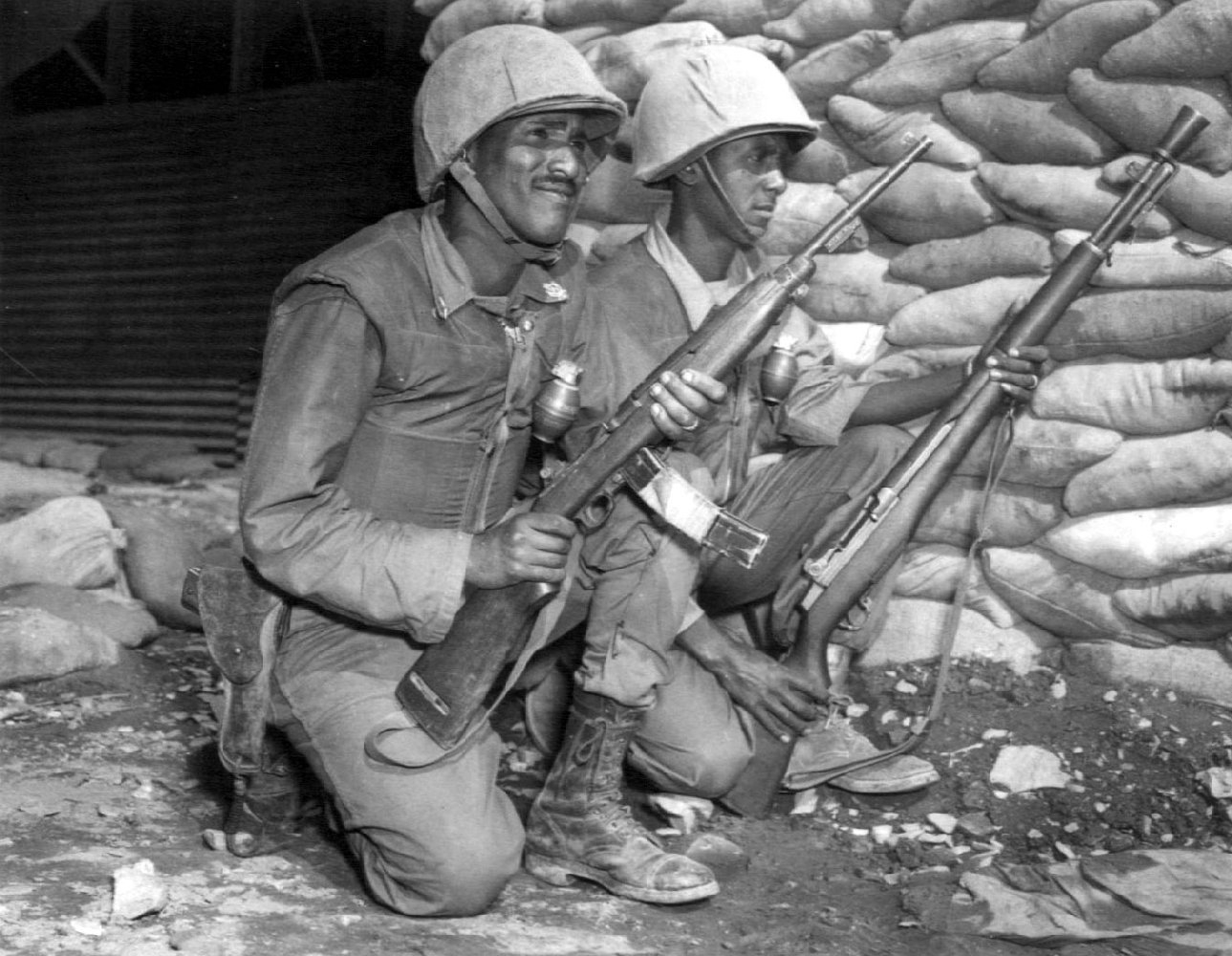
Ethiopian soldiers deployed with U.S.-made weapons in Korea, 1953. The M1 Carbine magazines are taped together.

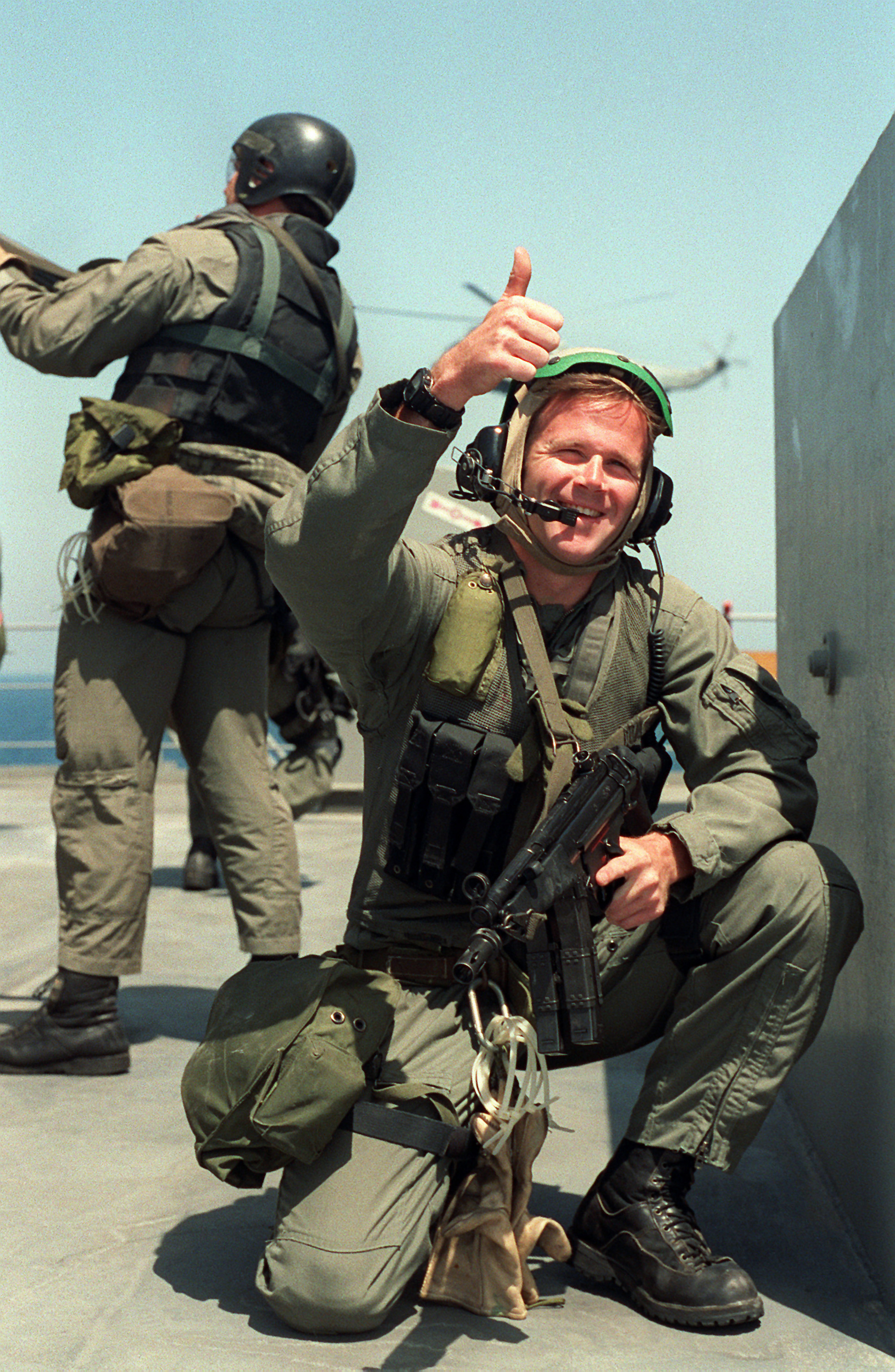
U.S. Navy SEAL with MP5 SMG and two magazines clamped together during Operation Desert Storm in 1991.

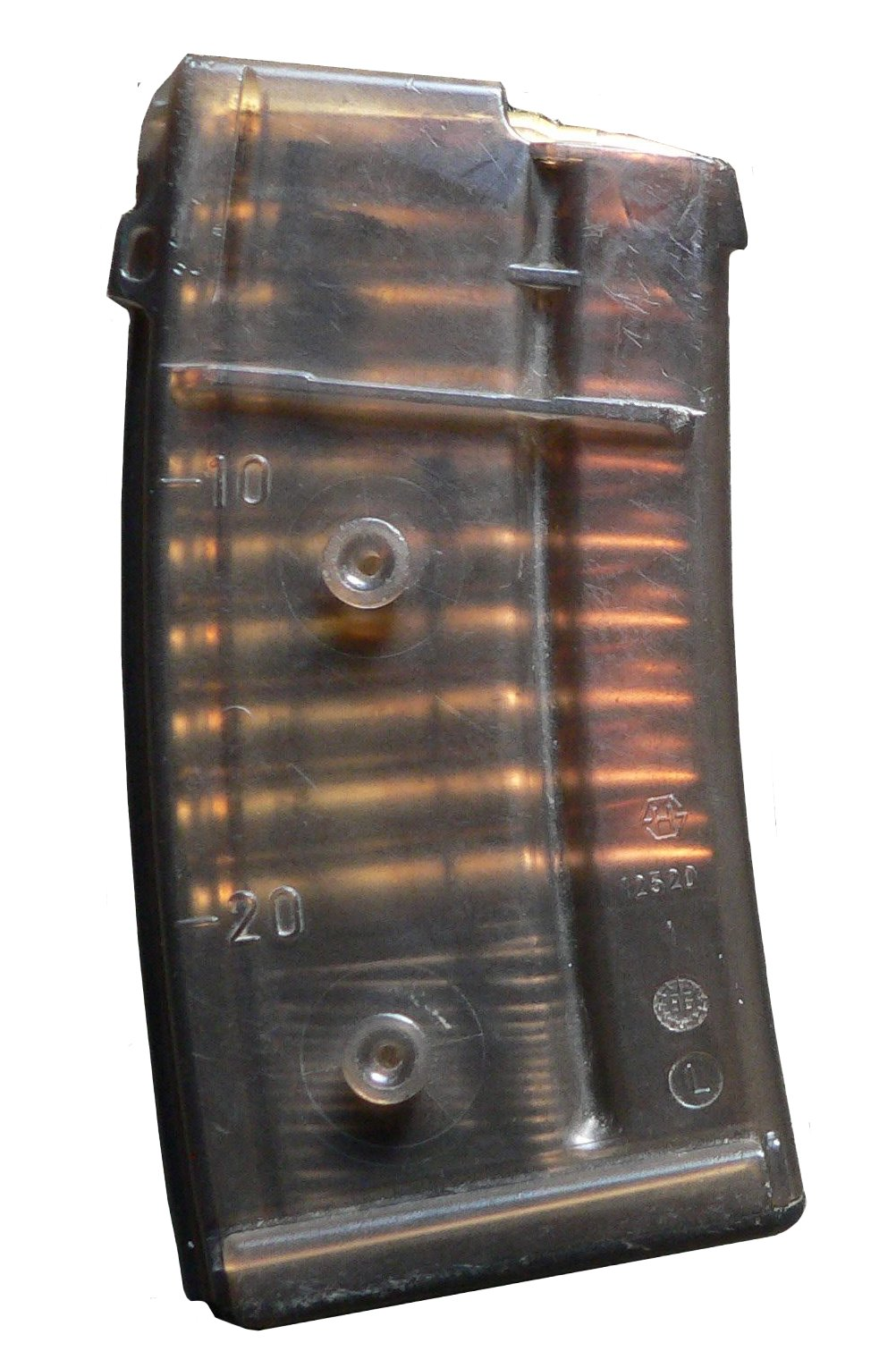
Detachable box magazine for a SIG 550 with studs for stacking multiple magazines together.

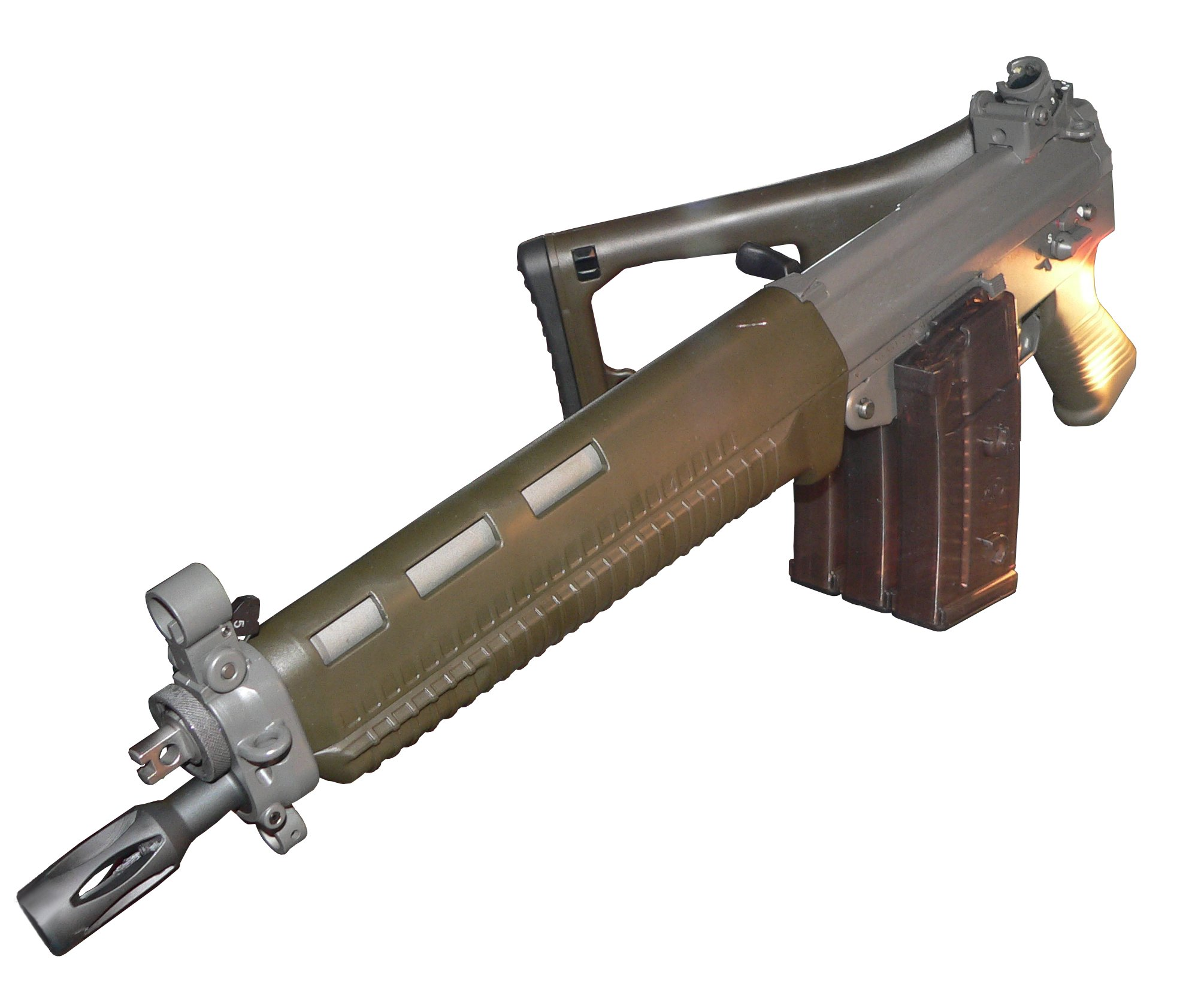
SIG SG 551 with three magazines held together.

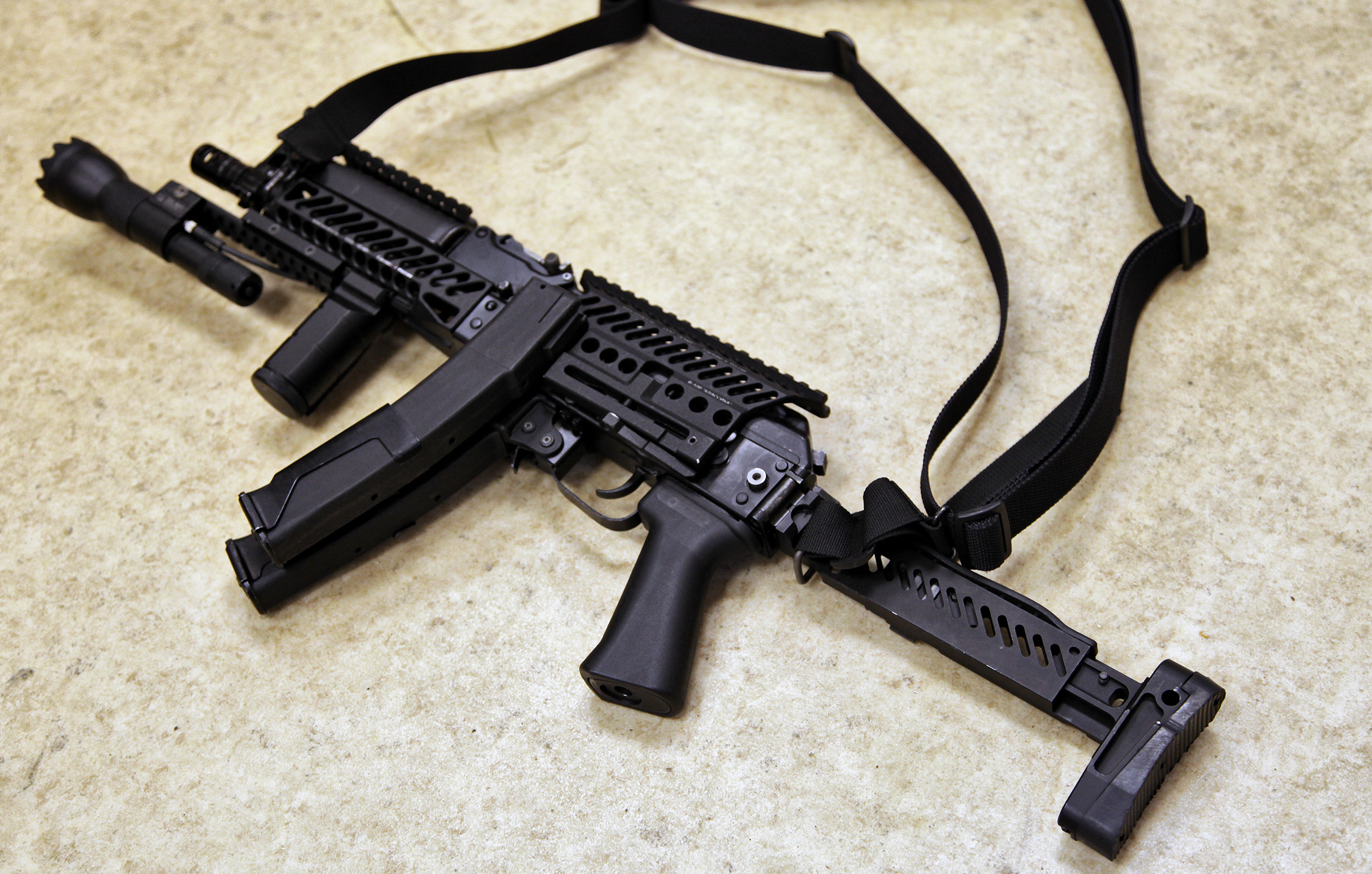
Vityaz-SN with a fastening device that joins two magazines together.

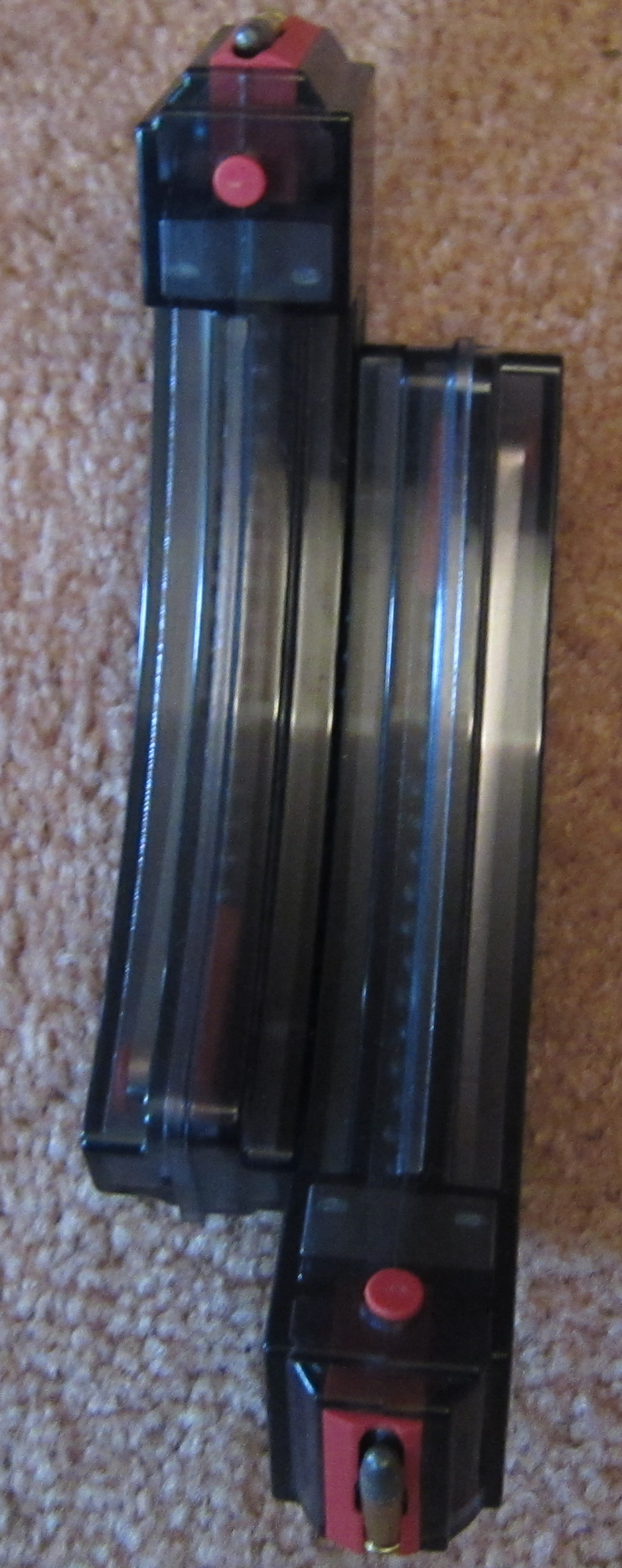
Two Ruger 10/22 magazines attached.

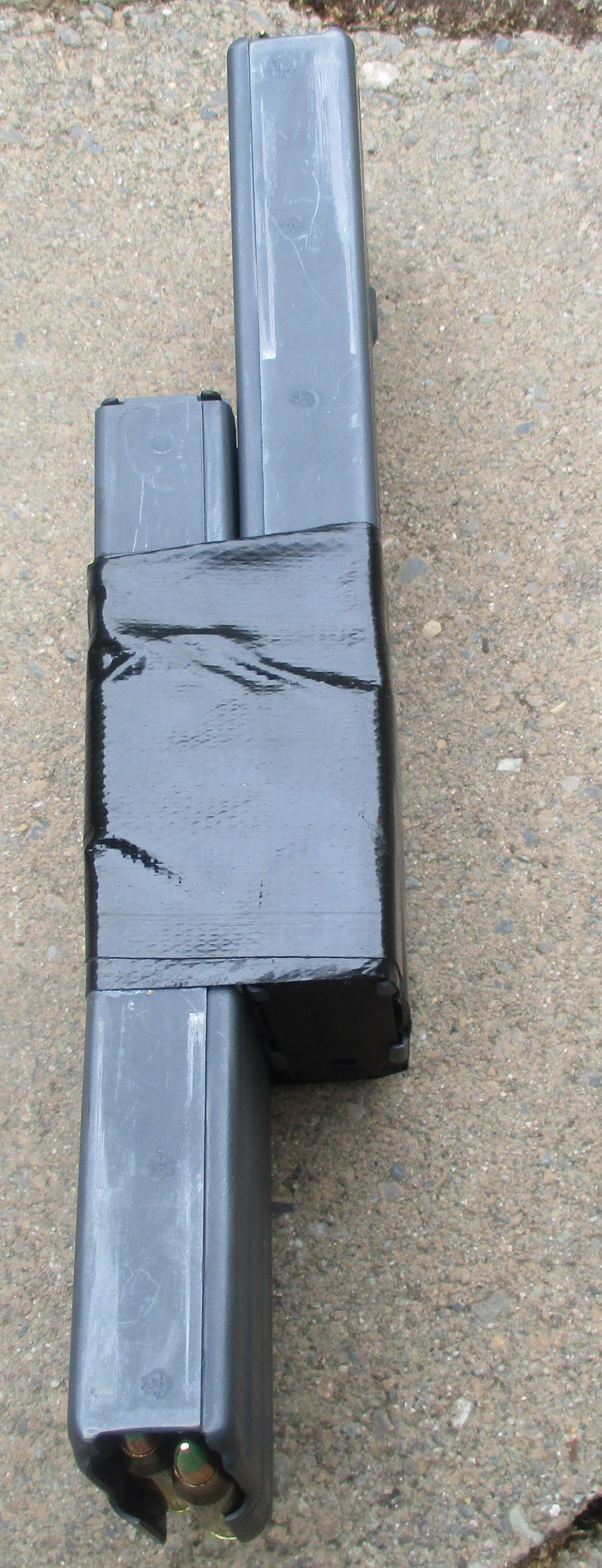
M16 magazines attached with duct tape.

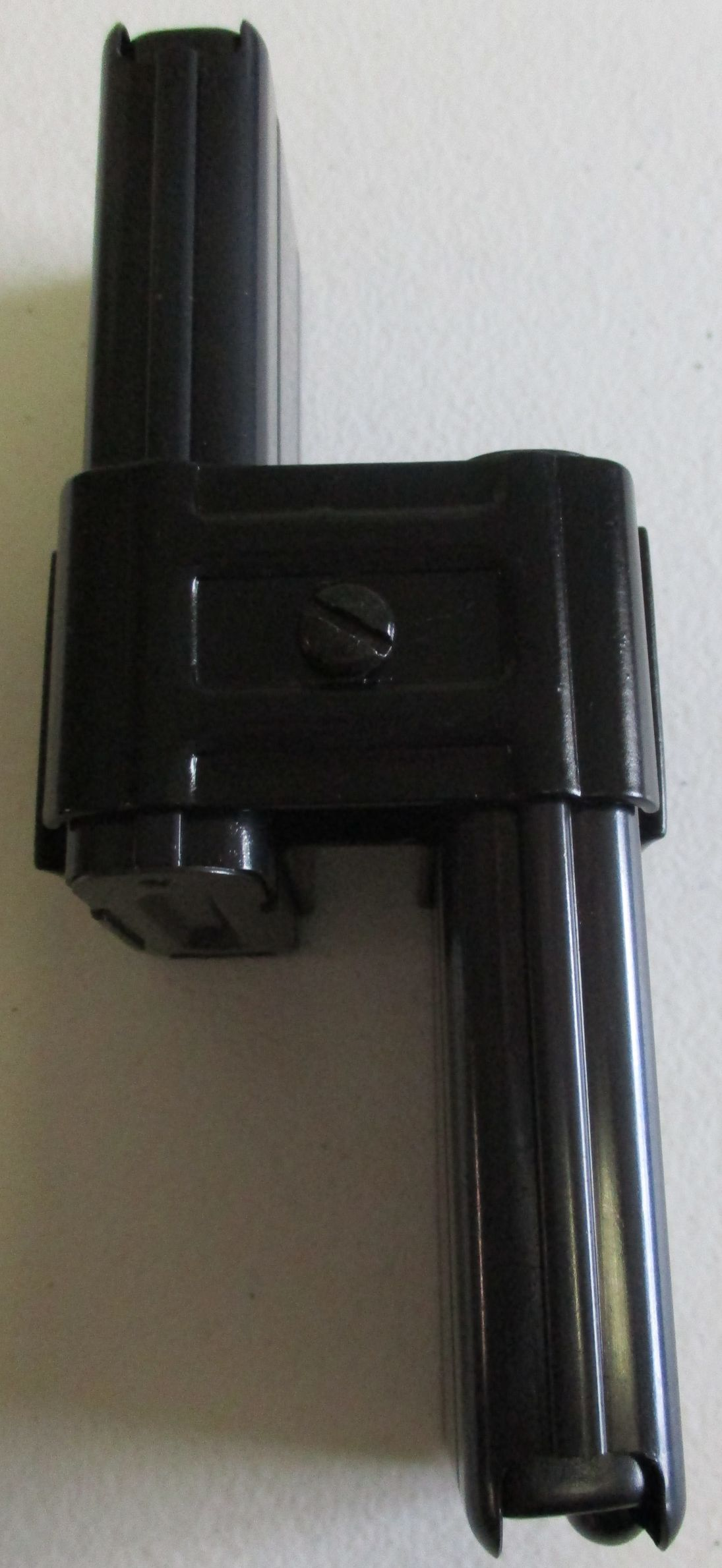
Two 15-round M1 Carbine magazines attached by a clip.

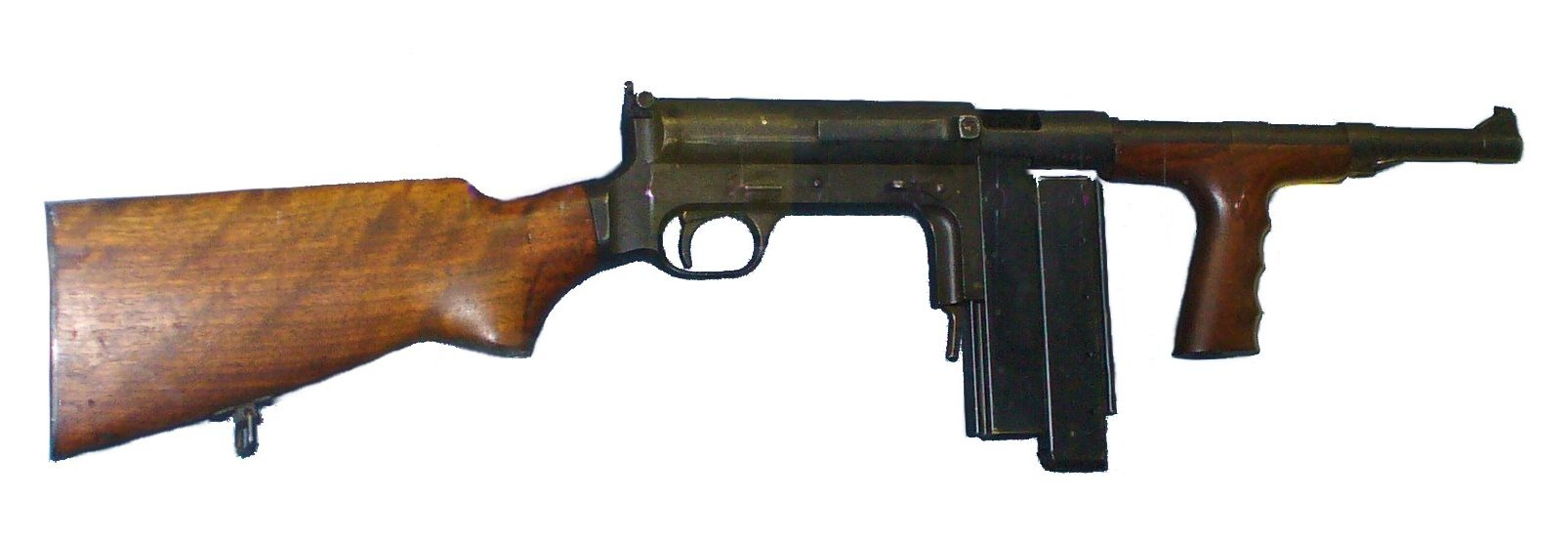
A United Defense M42 with magazines welded together.

== See also ==
- Glossary of firearms terms
