= Adelphi Hospital =

Defunct hospital in Brooklyn, New York, US

Geography
- Location: Brooklyn, New York, United States
- Coordinates: 40.686187276116314°N 73.97069481817907°W

History
- Opened: 1929
- Closed: 1974

Links
- Lists: Hospitals in New York State

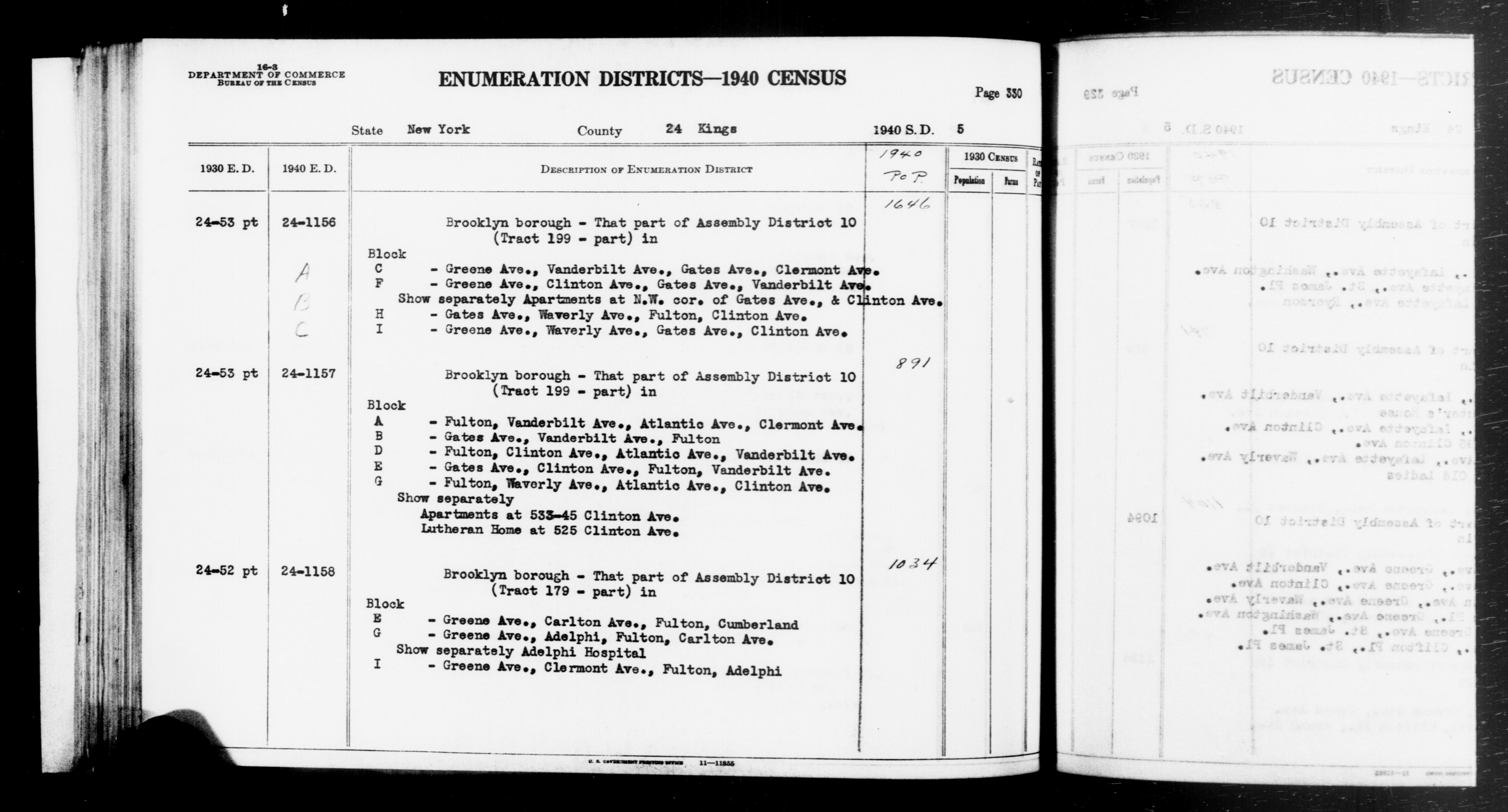
Adelphi Hospital, in 1940 census document

Adelphi Hospital was a 146-bed voluntary hospital that opened in 1929 at 50 Green Avenue and closed in 1974. It "served the Fort Greene section of Brooklyn." The hospital was in "a seven-story, fireproof building" and was located at "the corner of Greene Ave and Adelphi St."

== History ==
For five years, covering three contracts, the hospital and a union for nonprofessional employees went through a strike about which The New York Times used the word tinderbox. The situation "emptied most beds in the hospital and forced many strikers to seek welfare assistance."

The Brooklyn Public Library archive noted that

- an anonymous philanthropist funded giving $5 "to every baby born in Adelphi Hospital."
- the hospital remodeled in 1941, adding "additional operating rooms, new laboratories" and a solarium.

The hospital's 54 Greene Avenue property housed its Adelphi Mental Health Clinic. In 1978 the building was landmarked and subsequently was listed on city records as an office building.

After the hospital closed, part of it served as a medical center run by Josephine English, "the first African-American licensed obstetrician/gynecologist in New York State."
