= Deer gun =

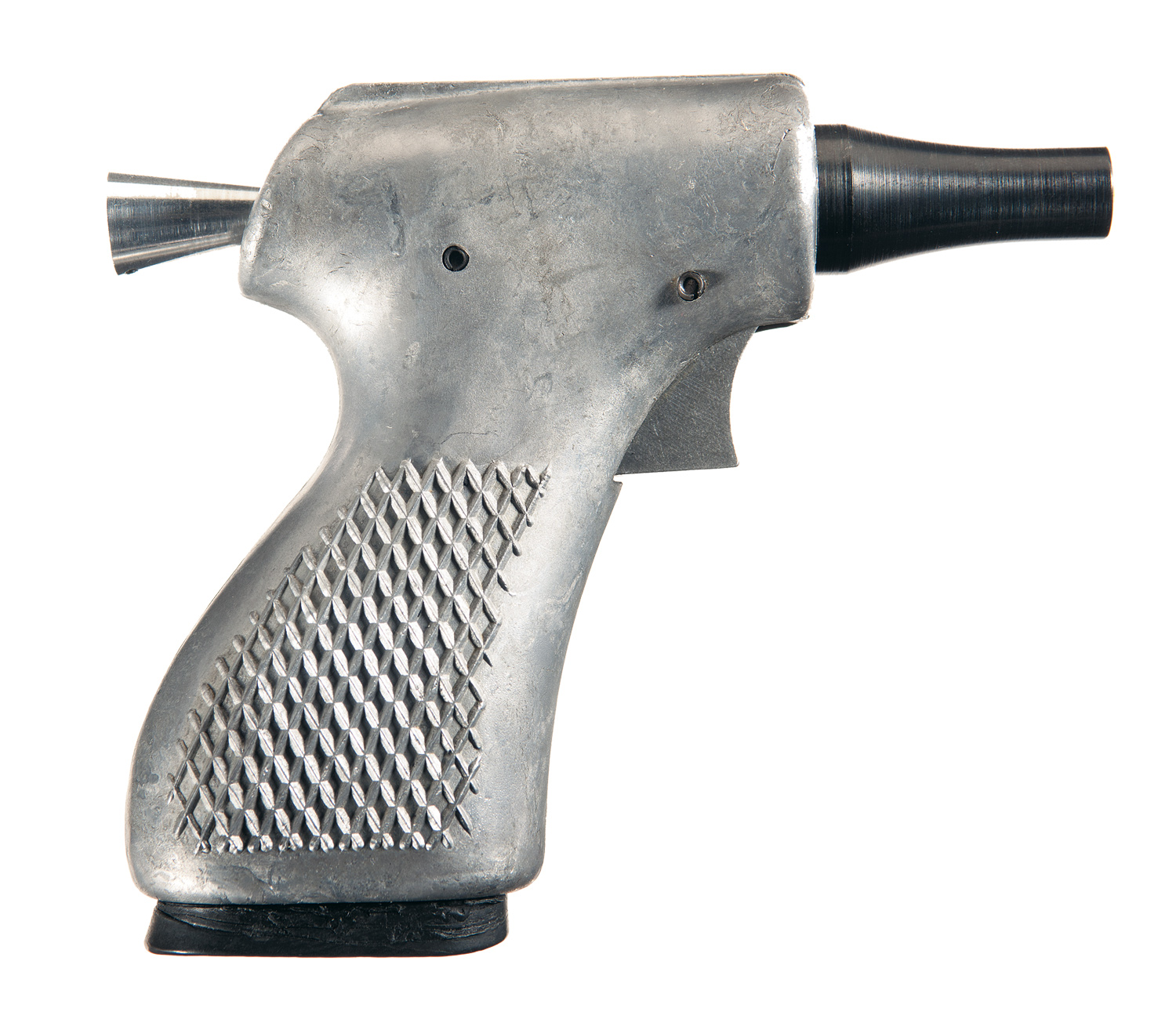
- A Deer gun
- Type: Single-shot pistol
- Place of origin: United States

Service history
- In service: 1964
- Used by: South Vietnam; United States
- Wars: Vietnam War

Production history
- Designer: CIA
- Designed: 1964
- Manufacturer: American Machine & Foundry Co.
- Produced: 1964
- No. built: 1,000

Specifications
- Mass: 12 oz (340 g)
- Length: 5.0 inches (130 mm)
- Barrel length: 1.875 (48 mm)
- Cartridge: 9×19mm Parabellum
- Action: single-shot
- Muzzle velocity: 1,050 ft/s (320 m/s)
- Sights: plastic clip

The Deer gun was a single-shot pistol developed by the Central Intelligence Agency as a successor to the FP-45 Liberator pistol. It was intended for distribution to South Vietnamese irregulars for use against North Vietnamese forces, but never saw actual service.

== Design ==
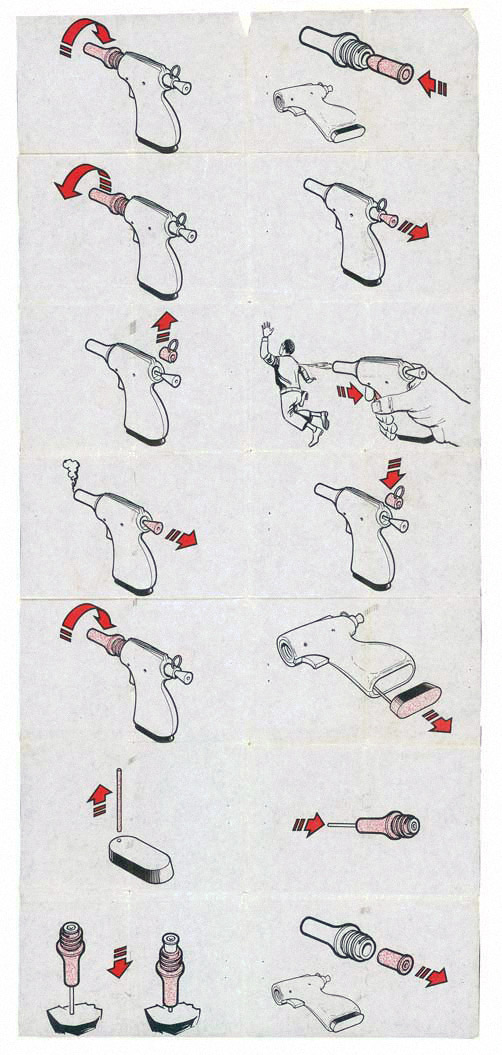
Instruction leaflet

The Deer gun was made of cast aluminium, with the receiver formed into a cylinder at the top of the weapon. The striker protruded from the rear of the receiver and was cocked in order to fire, and a plastic clip was placed there to prevent an accidental discharge, as the Deer gun had no mechanical safety. The grip had raised checkering, was hollow, and had space for three 9mm rounds and a rod for clearing the barrel of spent cases. The Deer gun lacked any marking identifying the manufacturer or user, in order to prevent tracing the weapons, and all were delivered in unmarked polystyrene boxes with three 9mm rounds and a series of pictures depicting the operation of the gun. A groove ran down a ramp on top for sighting. The barrel was unscrewed for loading and removing the empty cartridge case. A cocking knob was pulled until cocked. The aluminium trigger had no trigger guard.

== Operation ==
The Deer gun was loaded by removing the barrel and placing a 9mm cartridge in the chamber. The striker was then cocked, and a small plastic clip was placed around the striker to impede the forward motion of the striker to prevent accidental discharge. The barrel was then screwed back onto the receiver. The gun was fired by removing the plastic clip, placing it on the barrel where it would become the sight, and pulling the trigger. At this point, the user would take the victim's weapons and equipment if the opportunity presented itself, and then flee. Later, the user would reload the gun by unscrewing the barrel and ejecting the spent case with the provided barrel rod and following the outlined procedure.

== History ==
One production run of 1,000 Deer guns was made in 1964 as an initial run, with the final cost projected as US$3.95 per gun (equivalent to $41 in 2025). Rather than the Vietnam War being a small clandestine war, it became a full-scale war where the Deer gun would not be as useful as foreseen. Some Deer guns were evaluated in Vietnam, but the fate of the rest is unknown. Most sources state that most were destroyed.

== See also ==
- FP-45 Liberator, pistol manufactured by the United States military during World War II for use by resistance forces in occupied territories
- Liberator, a 3D printed handgun designed in 2013 that takes inspiration from the CIA's work.
