= M3 submachine gun =

American submachine gun

Submachine Gun, Cal. .45, M3
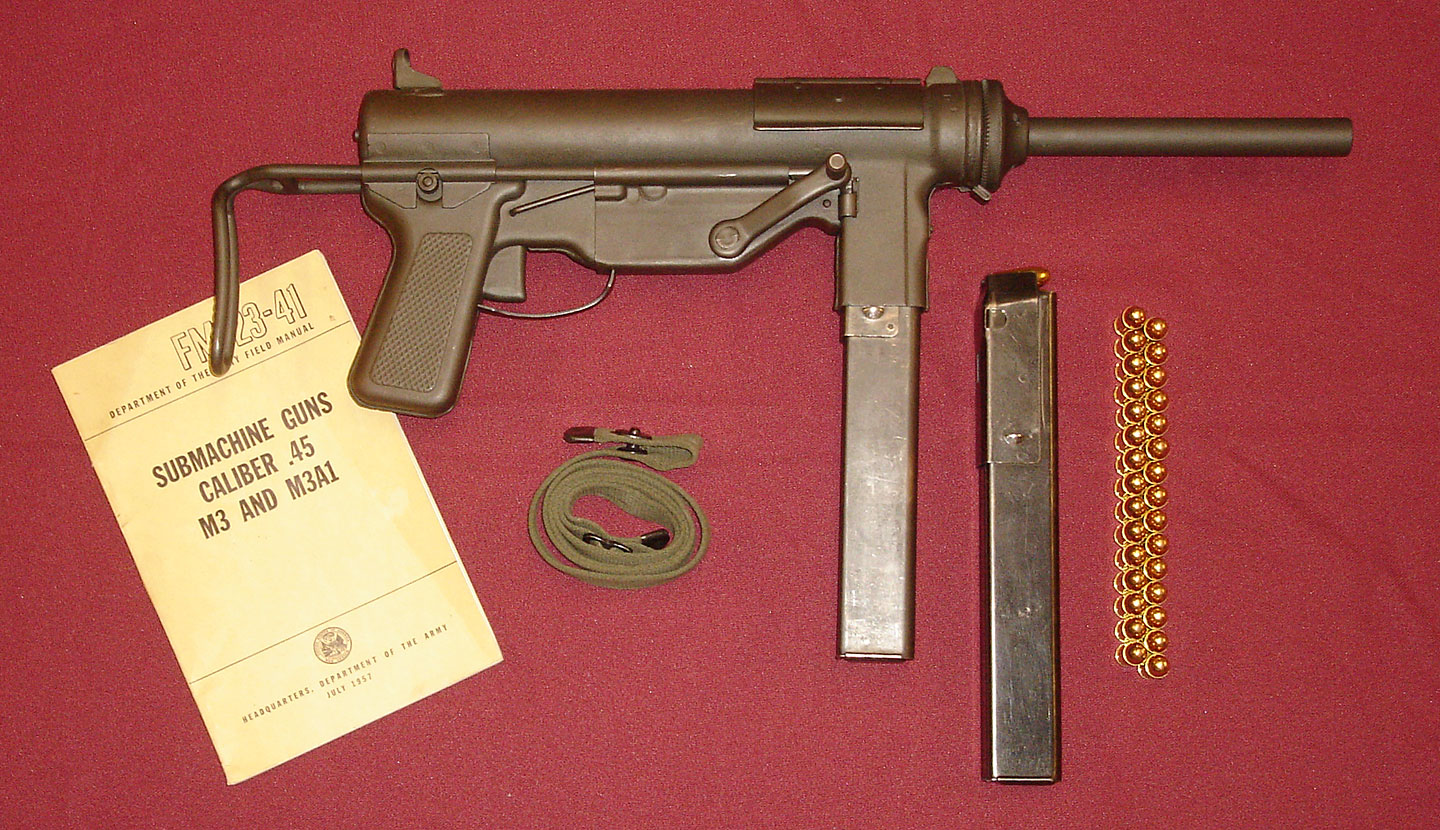
- World War II–era Guide Lamp M3 submachine gun with 30-round magazine and other accessories. The Buffalo Arms bolt in this original M3 is dated January 1944.
- Type: Submachine gun
- Place of origin: United States

Service history
- In service: 1943–present
- Used by: See Users
- Wars: World War II; Chinese Civil War; Greek Civil War; Indonesian National Revolution; First Indochina War; Hukbalahap Rebellion; Korean War; Cuban Revolution; Algerian War; Bay of Pigs Invasion; Vietnam War; The Troubles; Laotian Civil War; Malayan Emergency; Sino-Indian War; Communist insurgency in Malaysia (1968–1989); Papua Conflict; Rhodesian Bush War; Cambodian Civil War; Turkish invasion of Cyprus; Shaba II; Cambodian–Vietnamese War; Sino-Vietnamese War; Nicaraguan Revolution; Salvadoran Civil War; Argentine Dirty War; Falklands War; Soviet–Afghan War; Iran–Iraq War; Persian Gulf War; Moro conflict; Burundi Civil War; Kosovo War; First Ambon riots; War in Afghanistan; Iraq War; Syrian Civil War

Production history
- Designer: George Hyde
- Designed: 1942
- Manufacturer: General Motors, others
- Unit cost: Approx. US$20 (1943; equivalent to $279 in 2025)
- Produced: 1943–1945; early 1950s
- No. built: Total: 655,363: M3: 606,694; M3A1: 48,669
- Variants: M3A1; PAM1; PAM2; T29

Specifications
- Mass: M3 (empty): 8.15 lb (3.70 kg); M3A1 (empty): 7.95 lb (3.61 kg)
- Length: 29.1 in (740 mm) stock extended / 21.9 in (556.3 mm) stock collapsed
- Barrel length: 8 in (203.2 mm)
- Cartridge: .45 ACP (11.43×23 mm); 9×19mm Parabellum; .30 Carbine (T29 prototype)
- Action: Blowback, open bolt
- Rate of fire: 450 rounds/min cyclic (= 7 1/2 / second)
- Muzzle velocity: 900 ft/s (274 m/s)
- Effective firing range: Sights fixed to 100 yards (91 m)
- Feed system: 30-round or 32-round detachable box magazines
- Sights: Fixed rear peep sight and blade foresight, calibrated to 100 yards for caliber .45 M1911 ball ammunition

The M3 is an American .45-caliber submachine gun adopted by the U.S. Army on 12 December 1942, as the United States Submachine Gun, Cal. .45, M3. The M3 was chambered for the same .45 ACP round fired by the Thompson submachine gun, but was cheaper to mass produce and lighter, at the expense of accuracy. The M3 was commonly referred to as the "Grease Gun" or simply "the Greaser", owing to its visual similarity to a grease gun, a mechanic's tool.

The M3 was intended as a replacement for the Thompson submachine gun, and began to enter frontline service by mid-1944. By late 1944, the M3A1 variant was introduced, which also saw use in the Korean War and later conflicts.

The M14 rifle, adopted in 1959, was intended to replace the M3A1 (as well as the M1 Garand, M1918 Browning Automatic Rifle and the M1 carbine) but the recoil of the M14's 7.62×51mm NATO cartridge proved too powerful for the submachine gun role. The M14 was in turn replaced by the M16 rifle in 1964, and this weapon and its subsequent shorter iterations (XM-177, firing the intermediate 5.56×45mm NATO cartridge) was a better replacement for the M3A1. M3A1 submachine guns were retired from U.S. frontline service after 1959, but continued to be issued, for example as backup weapons for armored vehicle crews as late as the Gulf War (1990–1991). Many overseas US military bases continued to issue these for certain crews into the mid to late 1990s.

== History ==
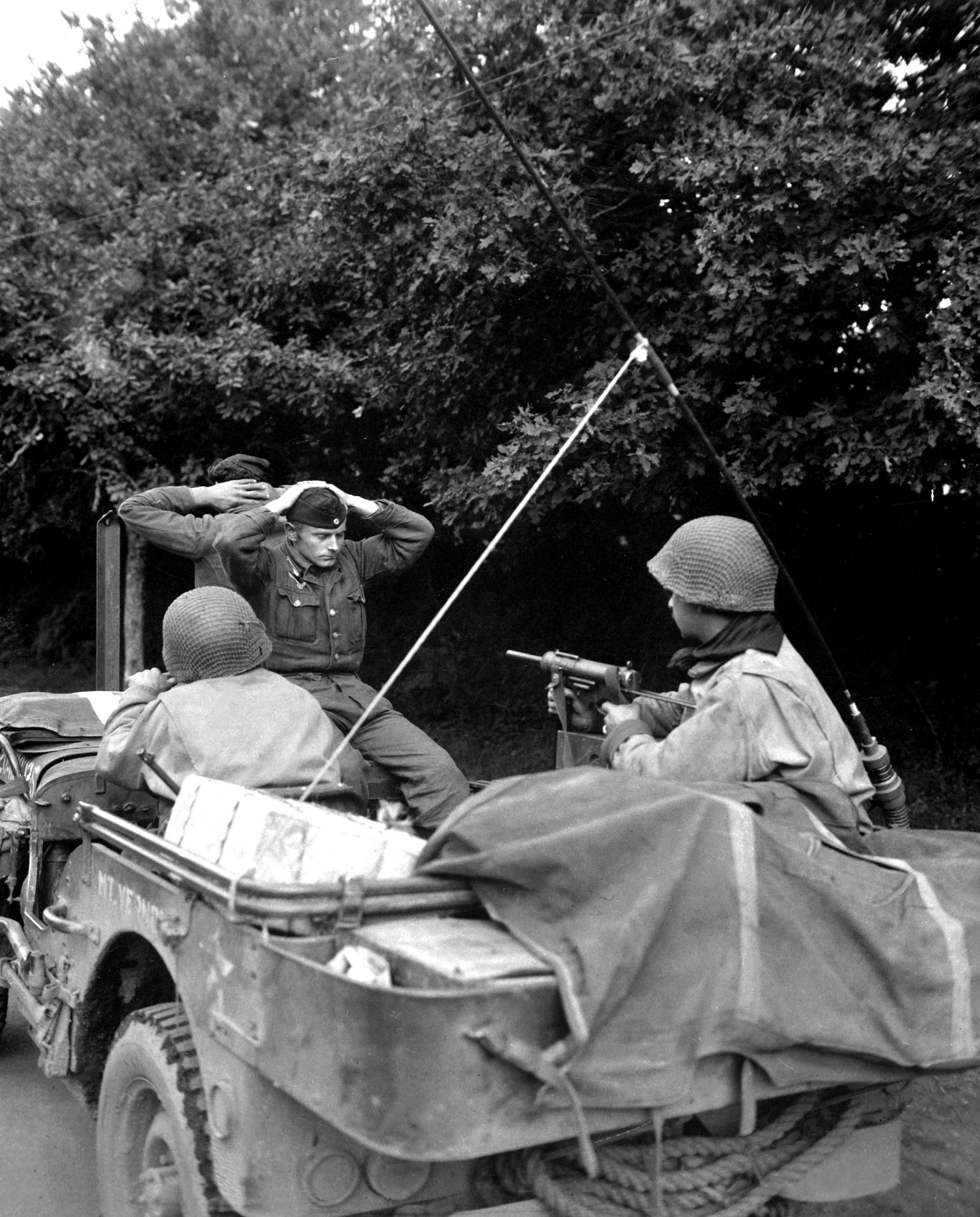
M3 in use in Brittany, France, August 1944

In 1941, the U.S. Army Ordnance Board observed the effectiveness of submachine guns employed in Western Europe, particularly the German 9×19mm MP 40 and British Sten submachine gun and initiated a study to develop its own "Sten" type submachine gun in October 1942. The Ordnance Department requested the Army submit a list of requirements for the new weapon, and Ordnance in turn received a separate list of requirements from both the Infantry and Cavalry branches for a shoulder-fired weapon with full or semiautomatic fire capability in caliber .45 ACP or .30 Carbine.

The two lists of requirements received by Ordnance were then reviewed and amended by officials at Aberdeen Proving Ground (APG). The amended requirement called for a weapon of all-sheet metal construction in .45 ACP, designed for fast and inexpensive production with a minimum of machining and featuring both fully automatic and semi-automatic fire capabilities, a heavy bolt to keep the cyclic rate of fire under 500 rounds per minute and the ability to place 90% of shots fired from a standing position in full automatic mode on a 6x6 feet target at a range of 50 yards. The benchmark for testing the M3's performance would be the M1928A1 Thompson.

George Hyde of General Motors' Inland Division was given the task of designing the new weapon, while Frederick Sampson, Inland Division's chief engineer, was responsible for preparing and organizing tooling for production. The original T15 specifications of 8 October 1942 were altered to remove the semi-automatic fire function, as well as to permit installation of a kit to convert the weapon's original .45 caliber to that of 9 mm Parabellum. The new designation for the 9 mm/.45 full-automatic-only weapon was the T20.

Five prototype models of the .45 T20 and five 9 mm conversion kits were built by General Motors for testing. At the initial military trials, the T20 successfully completed its accuracy trials with a score of 97 out of 100. In the endurance test, the test weapon fired more than 5,000 rounds of brass-case ammunition, with only two failures to feed. Four army test boards composed of multiple army service branches independently tested and reviewed the T20 prototype weapons including the Airborne Command, the Amphibious Warfare Board, the Infantry Board, and the Armored Force Board. All four branches reported malfunctions caused by the magazine, mostly attributed to defective or jammed magazine followers.

The T20 was formally approved by U.S. Army Ordnance for production at GM's Guide Lamp Division in Anderson, Indiana, in December 1942 as the U.S. Submachine Gun, Caliber .45, M3. Guide Lamp produced 606,694 of the M3 variant submachine gun between 1943 and 1945. Although reports of malfunctions caused by the single-feed magazine design appeared during the initial firing trials, no changes were made to the M3 magazine.

Around 1,000 M3 submachine guns in caliber 9 mm Parabellum were built by Guide Lamp. These original 9 mm guns, identified by the markings U.S. 9 mm S.M.G. on the left side of the magazine well (without any model designation, such as M3), were delivered to the OSS in 1944. The 9mm M3 was also supplied to the French, Belgian, Dutch, Italian and Norwegian resistance groups so that captured German ammo could be used thus reducing the need for .45 ACP ammo resupply drops from the OSS and the SOE. Additionally, Rock Island Arsenal and Buffalo Arms Corporation manufactured parts for a limited number of 9 mm conversion kits for the M3. Though 25,000 kits were originally requested for procurement, this was changed to a recommendation by the Ordnance Committee in December 1943 that only 500 9 mm conversion kits be obtained. Procurement was authorized in February 1944, but it is believed that only a limited number of kits were actually produced. These conversion kits included a new 9 mm barrel, replacement bolt and recoil springs, a magazine well adapter for use with British Sten gun 32-round magazines, and a replacement 9 mm Sten magazine of British manufacture. As the M3's sights were not altered for the new cartridge, the 9 mm M3 shot high at 100 yards, but the sighting error was deemed inconsequential. The OSS also requested approximately 1,000 .45-caliber M3 submachine guns with an integral sound suppressor designed by Bell Laboratories. Specially drilled barrels and barrel nuts were manufactured by Guide Lamp, while the High Standard Firearms Company produced the internal components and assembled the weapon. The Bell Laboratories suppressor was estimated to be only 80% as efficient as the British suppressed STEN Mk IIS.

With its stamped, riveted, and welded construction, the M3 was originally designed as a minimum-cost small arm, to be used and then discarded once it became inoperative. As such, replacement parts, weapon-specific tools, and sub-assemblies were not made available to unit-, depot-, or ordnance-level commands at the time of the M3's introduction to service. In 1944, a shortage of M3 submachine guns created by the need for interim production changes forced U.S. Army Ordnance workshops to fabricate pawl springs and other parts to keep existing weapons operational.

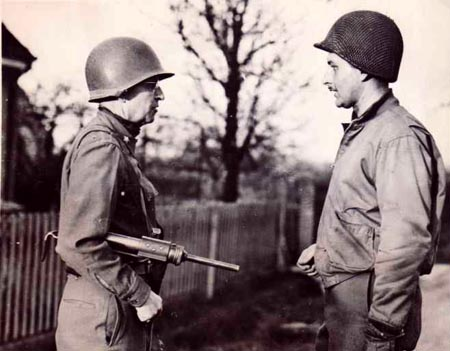
Brig. Gen. Harrison, armed with M3 submachine gun in conversation with Capt. John E. Kent, Co. A, 117th Infantry Regiment somewhere in France, fall 1944

After its introduction to service, reports of unserviceability of the M3 commenced in February 1944 with stateside units in training, who reported early failure of the cocking handle/bolt retraction mechanism on some weapons. Similar reports later came from U.S. forces in Britain who were issued the M3. An investigation revealed several deficiencies in the construction of the M3's bolt retraction mechanism, together with issues concerning barrel removal and retention as well as easily bent rear sights. As a result, several product improvements were incorporated into all new M3 production, including a new design retracting pawl with improved heat treatment, a new spring stop fitted to the right-hand brace of the retracting lever, a modified ejector featuring a cocking lever trip, a larger ratchet pad with improved heat treatment to more securely retain the barrel assembly, and strengthening gussets fitted to the sides of the fixed 'L' rear sight. After new complaints were raised about accidental magazine releases and failure of the wire buttstock to remain in place in the collapsed position, two additional changes were made to M3 production and approved by Ordnance on 31 August 1944. This included a small sheet metal guard around the magazine release button, and the inclusion of a stop between the two rods forming the wire stock at the butt end.

The M3 submachine gun was suitable for issue to tank crews, drivers, and paratroopers because of its compact design. The M3 was also ideal for the Pacific War because the Thompson could easily jam if not cleaned, which had to be done constantly in the jungle environment because the action did not have a cover over the ejector as the M3 did.

The improved and simplified M3A1 variant was introduced in December 1944 in response to field requests for further improvements to the basic M3 design; 15,469 were produced before the end of World War II, and an additional 33,200 during the Korean War.

It was originally hoped that the M3 could be produced in numbers sufficient to cancel future orders for the Thompson submachine gun, and to allow the Army to gradually withdraw the more expensive Thompson from front-line service. However, due to unforeseen production delays and requests for modifications, the M3 was introduced later than expected, and purchases of the Thompson continued until February 1944. The M3 first entered combat service in the summer of 1944. A total of 622,163 M3/M3A1 submachine guns of all types were assembled by the end of World War II.

The M3 became the main submachine gun over the Thompson for the U.S. and South Korean forces during the Korean War, because the Communists used the Thompson submachine gun, which the U.S. donated during World War II, as one of their main weapons during the war.

The M3 and M3A1 were largely withdrawn from U.S. frontline service beginning in 1959. But it continued to be issued until at least the 1991 Gulf War as equipment aboard armored vehicles, in particular the M60 tank (which was used by some United States National Guard units until 1997).

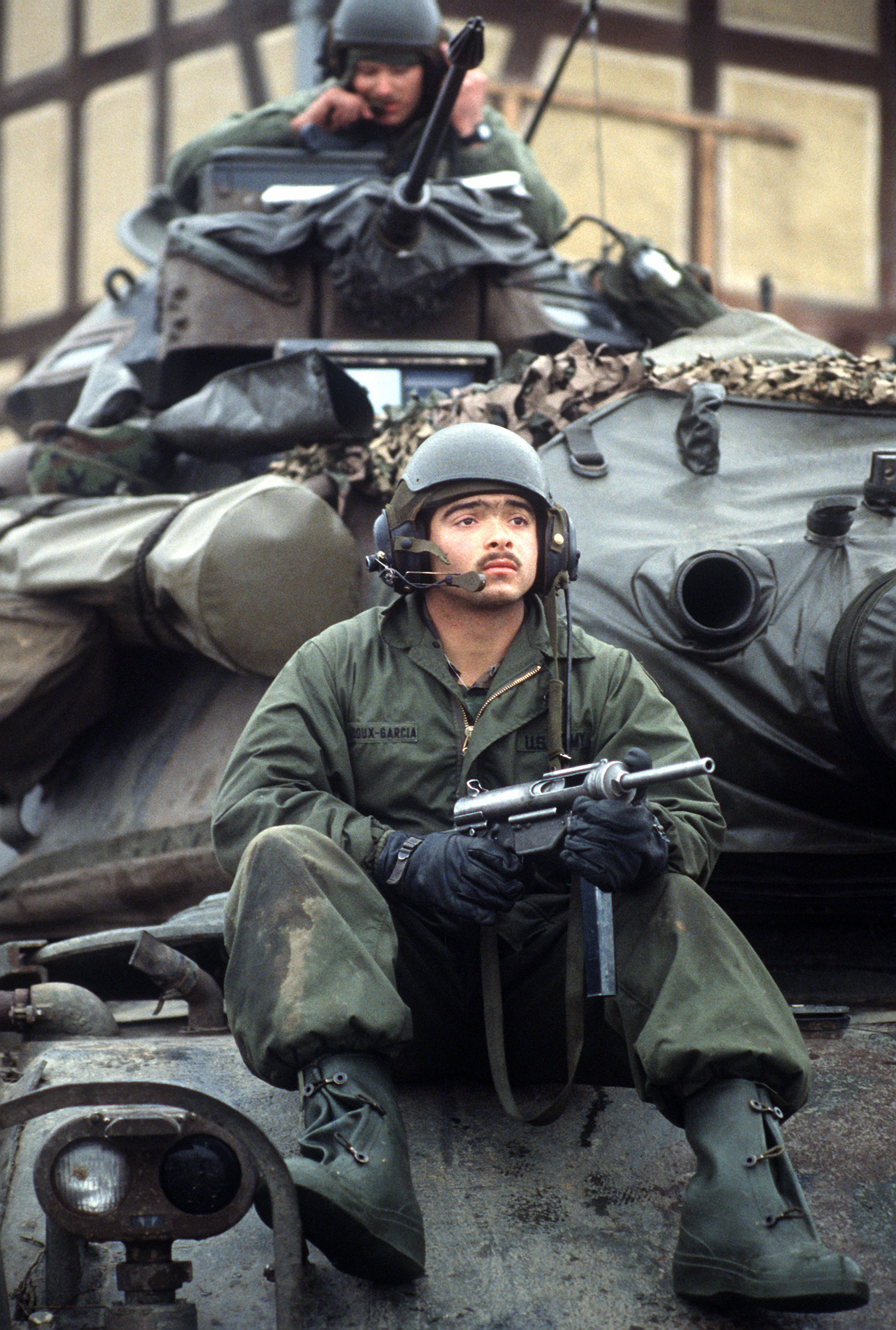
A U.S. Army PFC tanker, armed with an M3A1 submachine gun guards his M60A3 main battle tank during Central Guardian, a phase of Exercise REFORGER in West Germany, January 1985

In the Vietnam War, suppressed versions were made with removable barrels that can be installed after taking a standard barrel out, the former made by Guide Lamp.

It was also the initial submachine gun equipping the Delta Force (formed in 1977) who prized it for its impressively quiet performance when equipped with a suppressor. Within a year, the M3A1 had been replaced by the 9 mm Heckler & Koch MP5 submachine gun in Delta Force use, but a few were kept past that date as it was felt that the M3A1 performed better with a suppressor than the MP5. Delta Force M3A1s were fitted with thumb safeties.

During the Troubles, some of the M3A1s captured from the Provisional Irish Republican Army by British forces were equipped with suppressors.

== Design details ==
The M3 is an automatic, air-cooled blowback-operated weapon that fires from an open bolt. Constructed of plain 0.060-inch-thick (1.5 mm) sheet steel, the M3 receiver was stamped in two halves that were then welded together. The M3 has a fixed firing pin milled into the face of the bolt and fires using the principle of advanced primer ignition blowback operation. The bolt was drilled longitudinally to support two parallel guide rods, upon which were mounted twin return (recoil) springs. This configuration allows for larger machining tolerances while providing operating clearance in the event of dust, sand or mud ingress. The M3 features a spring-loaded extractor which is housed inside the bolt head, while the ejector is located in the trigger group. Like the British Sten, time and expense was saved by cold-swaging the M3's barrel.

=== Operating mechanism ===
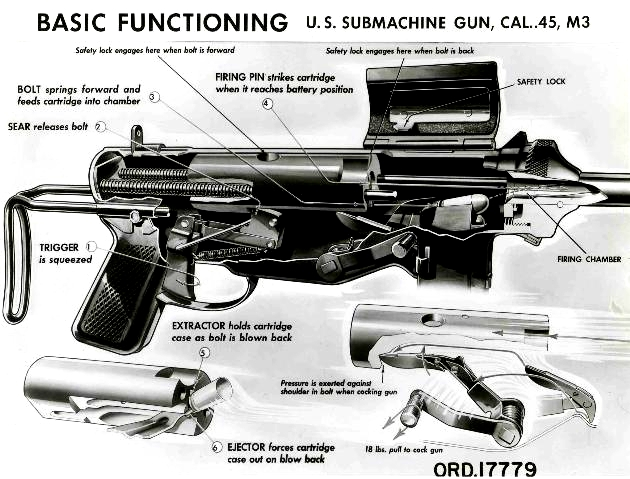
A diagram of the M3 illustrating function

The M3 operating sequence is as follows: the bolt is cocked to the rear using the cocking handle located on the right side of the ejector housing. When the trigger is pulled, the bolt is driven forward by the recoil springs, stripping a round from the feed lips of the magazine and guiding the round into the chamber. The bolt then continues forward and the firing pin strikes the cartridge primer, igniting the round, resulting in a high-pressure impulse, forcing the bolt back against the resistance of the recoil springs and the inertial mass of the bolt. By the time the bolt and empty casing have moved far enough to the rear to open the chamber, the bullet has left the barrel and pressure in the barrel has dropped to a safe level. The M3's comparatively low cyclic rate was a function of the relatively low pressure generated by the .45 ACP round, a heavy bolt, and recoil springs with a lighter-than-normal compression rate.

=== Features ===
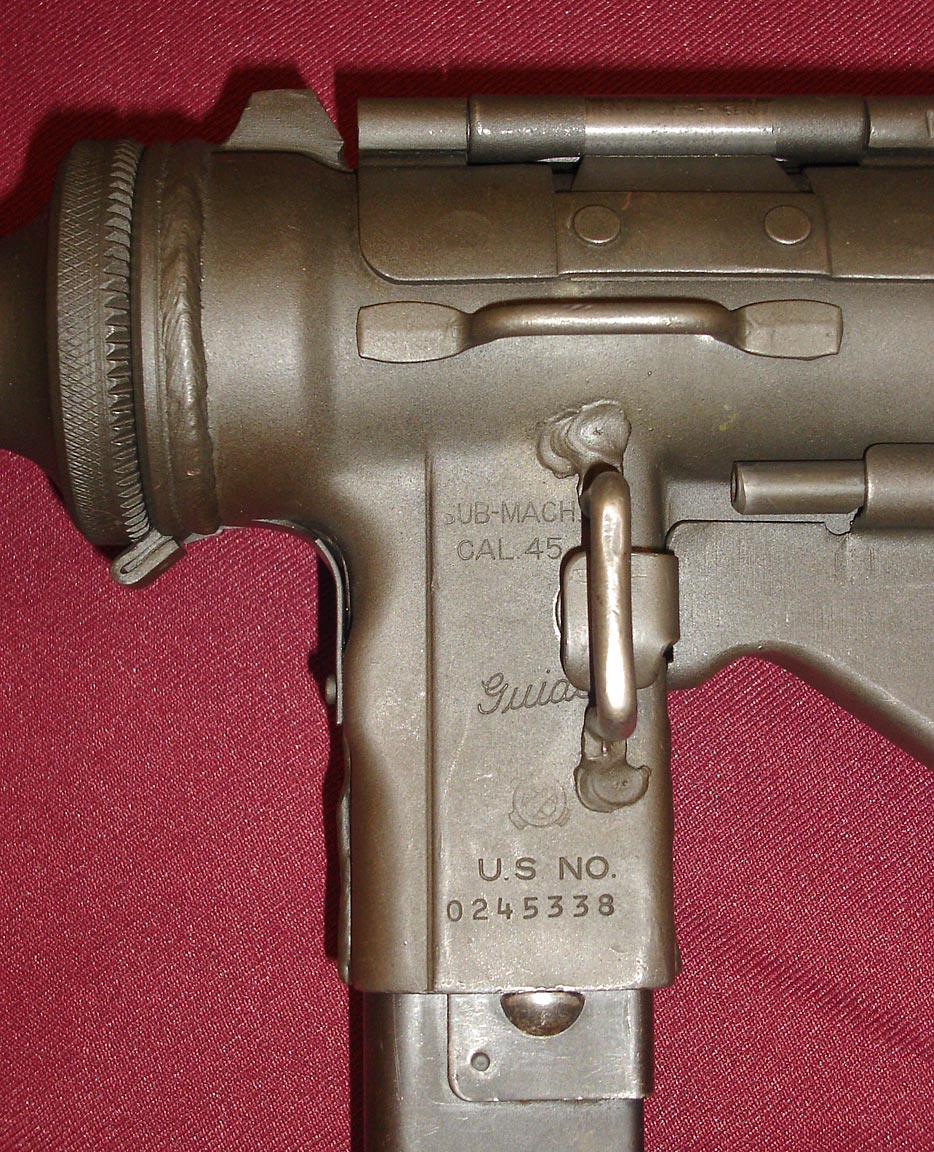
M3 receiver markings

The gun used metal stamping and pressing, spot welding and seam welding extensively in its construction, reducing the number of man-hours required to assemble a unit. Only the barrel, bolt and firing mechanism were precision machined. The receiver consists of two sheet metal halves welded together to form a cylinder. At the front end is a knurled metal cap which is used to retain the removable barrel. The cold-swaged, rifled barrel has four right-hand grooves. M3 and M3A1 submachine guns can be fitted with an optional, detachable flash hider, though none saw any service in World War II. A later production flash hider designated Hider, Flash M9 was produced in time to see service during the Korean War. It proved popular in combat, as frequent night engagements emphasized the need to reduce flash signatures on small arms. In Korea, U.S. soldiers equipped with automatic weapons were taught to look above the flash of their weapon during night firing, a practice that sometimes prevented the detection of crawling enemy infiltrators and sappers. During night combat soldiers are trained to look for the enemy's muzzle flashes and fire in that direction, so having a machine gun with a significantly reduced muzzle flash allowed for better nighttime infiltration and gave soldiers an edge in combat.

Projecting to the rear is a one-piece wire stock made from a formed steel rod that telescopes into tubes on both sides of the receiver. Both ends of the stock were tapped and drilled so that it can be used as a cleaning rod. It can also be used as a disassembly tool or as a wrench used to unscrew the barrel cap.

The M3's cocking handle assembly is located on the right-hand side of the receiver on the ejector housing, just forward and above the trigger, and consists of nine parts. As the handle is pulled to the rear, a pawl rises to engage a notch in the bottom of the bolt, pushing the bolt to the rear until it locks back on the sear.

The fixed sights consist of a rear aperture sight preset for firing at 100 yards (approximately 91 m) and a front blade foresight. All M3 submachine guns were test-fired for accuracy at a distance of 100 feet (30 m). With the sights set at six o'clock on a bull's-eye target, each gun was required to keep four out of five shots within or cut the edge of a 3-inch (76 mm) bull's-eye to meet accuracy requirements.

The weapon's only safety is the hinged ejection port dust cover. This cover has a projection on the underside that engages a notch on the bolt, locking it in either its forward or rearmost positions. The M3 has no mechanical means of disabling the trigger, and the insertion of a loaded magazine loads the gun. With receiver walls made of relatively thin-gauge sheet metal, the M3/M3A1 is subject to disabling damage if dropped on an open dust cover—the covers bend easily, negating the safety feature. Dropping the gun on a sharp or hard surface can dent the receiver enough to bind the bolt.

The M3/M3A1's 30-round magazine was the source of complaints throughout the service life of the weapon. Unlike the Thompson, the M3 feeds from a double-column, single-feed detachable box magazine which holds 30 rounds and was patterned after the British Sten magazine; the single-feed design proved difficult to load by hand, and is more easily jammed by mud, dust, and dirt than double-column, staggered-feed designs like the Thompson. Plastic (Tenite) dust caps were later issued to cover the feed end of the magazine to keep out dust and other debris. Inland started development of the dust caps in May 1944, and they were formally adopted in November 1944.

== Variants ==
=== M3A1 ===
In December 1944, a modernized version of the M3 known as the M3A1 was introduced into service, with all parts except the bolt, housing assembly, and receiver interchangeable with those of the M3. The M3A1 had several improvements:

- Most significantly eliminating the troublesome crank-type cocking lever assembly, replaced by a recessed cocking slot machined into the top front portion of the bolt, letting it be cocked by putting a finger into the cocking slot and pulling back the bolt.
- The retracting pawl notch was removed, and a clearance slot for the cover hinge rivets was added.
- The ejection port and its cover were lengthened to allow the bolt to be drawn back far enough to be engaged by the sear.
- The safety lock was moved further to the rear on the cover.
- To make loading the single-feed magazine easier, a magazine loading tool was welded to the wire stock; it also served as a cleaning rod stop.
- The barrel bushing received two flat cuts that helped in barrel removal by using the stock as a wrench.
- The barrel ratchet was redesigned to provide a longer depressing lever for easier disengagement from the barrel collar.
- The spare lubricant clip (on the left side of the cocking lever assembly) was removed, replaced with an oil reservoir and an oiler in the pistol grip of the receiver assembly. The stylus on the oiler cap could also double as a drift to remove the extractor pin.

At 7.95 pounds empty, the M3A1 was slightly lighter than the M3, at 8.15 pounds empty, primarily due to the simplified cocking mechanism. The M3A1 was formally approved for production on 21 December 1944.

The M3A1 modifications resulted in a more reliable, lighter weight, easier to maintain, and easier to field strip submachine gun; the original M3 needed both the trigger guard removed and the cocking crank assembly detached from the receiver housing before unscrewing the barrel, but the M3A1 only required the user unscrew the barrel. To date, only one 9 mm conversion kit for the M3A1 has been discovered.

Because it had already been issued in large numbers, the existing M3 magazine design was retained, despite demonstrated deficiencies exposed during the weapon's firing trials and its early combat service. In an effort to improve reliability, a hard plastic Tenite cap designated T2 was adopted in November 1944 to fit over the feed lips of loaded magazines. These caps protected the feed lips while keeping out dirt, sand, and debris. Sometime during the 1960s the hard T2 plastic cap was replaced in service with one of pliant neoprene rubber, which could be removed with less noise. Unfortunately, during service in the humid climate of Vietnam it was discovered that the rubber cap caused rust to form on the covered portion of the magazine, while causing loaded ammunition to corrode.

Initially, M3 submachine guns returned for repair were not upgraded to the M3A1 standard, but merely inspected to ensure they had the improved M3 housing assembly and magazine release shield. During the Korean War, existing M3 guns in service were converted to the improved M3A1 configuration using additional new production parts. During the conversion, armorers frequently removed the M3 cocking handle, leaving the rest of the now-redundant cocking mechanism inside the subframe. Overall, the M3A1 was seen by most soldiers and Ordnance technicians as an improvement over the M3. However, complaints of accidental discharge continued to occur even as late as the Korean War. These incidents were sometimes caused by dropping the weapon on a hard surface with an impact sufficient to knock open the ejection port cover and propel the bolt backwards (but not enough to catch the sear). The return springs would then propel the bolt forward to pick up a cartridge from the magazine and carry it into the chamber, where the bolt's fixed firing pin struck the primer upon contact.

In 1945, the Guide Lamp factory manufactured 15,469 M3A1 submachine guns before production contracts were canceled with the end of the war. During the Korean War, Ithaca Gun Co built another 33,200 complete guns as well as manufacturing thousands of parts for the repair and rebuilding of existing M3 and M3A1 weapons.

=== T29 ===
Prototype chambered in .30 Carbine. The idea for the T29 was driven by logistical reasons and for a weapon to rival the StG 44 which used an intermediate round.

The first two examples used 14 inch barrels whereas the third used an 8 inch barrel. Notable differences of the T29 compared to the M3 SMG was the increased length of the magazine well and magazine release catch to use M1 Carbine magazines. Internal components such as the bolt was cut back 9.5mm to give the front of the bolt 15.8mm diameter round extension and a 12.7mm steel block at the rear of the bolt for weight. The guide rod locating plate ahead of the bolt was made thicker and given a central hole to match the round extension of the bolt. This operation closed the bolt head during the last part of the travel forward striking the cartridge. The mainsprings were also different, a system of two springs were used in the T29 to drive the bolt and also used a shorter stronger spring as a buffer. The ejector was also different as it was spring loaded.

Receivers of the T29 were modified from M3 SMG receivers using the same M3A1 layout without the previous damage prone cocking handle. Retractable M3 SMG stocks were used without the integral loading tool. Double column, double feed magazines were easy to load without the use of a speedloader. Ejection port was lengthened for the .30 carbine round with the dust cover acting as a safety.

== Foreign variants and derivatives ==
=== PAM-1 and 2 (Argentina) ===
In 1954, a variant of the U.S. M3A1 submachine gun was designed at the Argentine FMAP (Fábrica Militar de Armas Portátiles) factory in the city of Rosario and put into production the following year as the PAM-1 (Pistola Ametralladora Modelo 1). Constructed of somewhat thinner-gauge steel than the U.S. M3A1, the PAM-1 was in essence a 7/8-scale replica of the U.S. weapon in 9 mm Parabellum caliber, but was lighter and had a higher rate of fire. This was due to an incomplete transfer of all details to Argentina. In service, the PAM-1's thinner sheet steel receiver tended to overheat with extended firing, while the gun itself proved somewhat more difficult to control in automatic fire despite the smaller caliber. Additionally, triggering the weapon to fire individual shots proved difficult owing to the increased rate of fire. Problems with accidental discharges and accuracy with the PAM-1 led to an improved selective-fire version with a grip safety on the magazine housing known as the PAM-2, first introduced in 1963.

Colloquially referred to as La Engrasadora (the Greaser), 47,688 PAM-1 and PAM-2 submachine guns were produced between 1955 and 1972. A number of PAM-1 and PAM-2 submachine guns were used by the Argentine Army during the Falkland Islands War with the United Kingdom in 1982, and captured examples were tested by British military forces.

=== Type 36 and 37 (China) ===
The Type 36 is a direct clone of the M3A1, manufactured in 1947 at the Shenyang Arsenal in Mukden. It resembles a M3A1, except that it has no flats to allow the use of a wrench for easy removal and it has no oil bottle trap in the pistol grip. Its parts are not interchangeable with the M3A1.

Ten thousand Type 36s were made before they were obtained by pro-Communist forces in 1949.

The Type 37 is a direct clone of the 9mm-chambered M3, made at the 60th Jinling Arsenal near Nanking. Production continued in Taiwan as the Type 39, a successor to the Type 37.

== Users ==
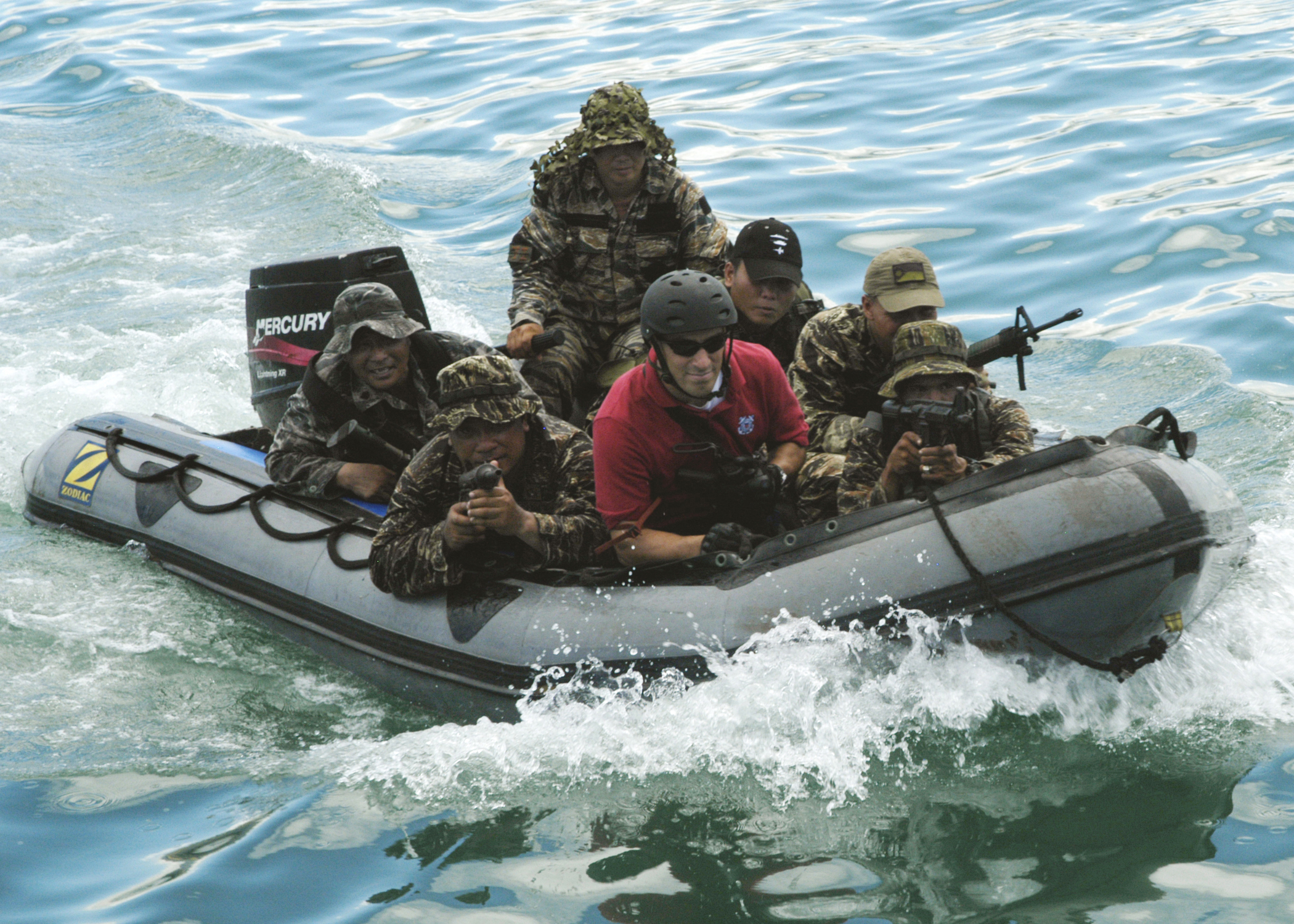
Philippine Naval Special Warfare Group members conduct interdiction training with the U.S. Coast Guard in Cebu City, 2009. Two of them are armed with M3s.

- Bolivia
- Burundi: Burundian rebels
- Cuba
- Ecuador
- Grenada
- Guatemala
- Haiti
- Indonesia: Obtained from Royal Netherlands East Indies Army after Indonesian independence.
- North Korea: Used by spies infiltrating South Korea.
- North Macedonia: 707 surplus M3 submachine guns were transferred to Macedonia in 1999.
- Morocco: 1,472 surplus M3A1 submachine guns were transferred to Morocco in the 1990s.
- Paraguay
- Philippines: Had their M3 submachine guns released from reserve stockpiles by the Philippine Navy due to budget constraints. Modifications done on the refurbished weapons include an integral suppressor and a Picatinny rail. The weapon had been tested with a prototype in May 2004. They are known as M3 SpecOps Generation 2.
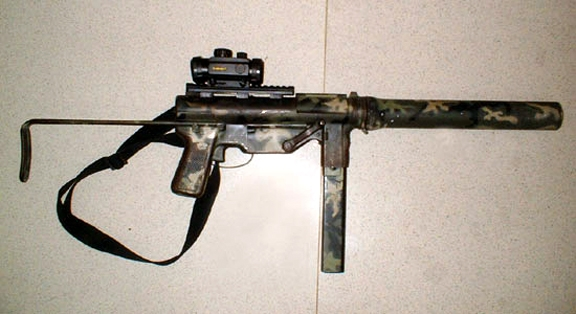
  Philippine Marine Corps (PMC) requisitioned M3 from the Philippine Navy has a Simmons red dot optical sight on picatinny rail, integral suppressor and a modified magazine to reduce jamming issues.
- Thailand: Used by Royal Thai Air Force.
- Turkey

=== Former ===
- Austria: 623 pieces used by the Austrian Armed Forces. Returned to the USA under the MAP agreement.
- Brazil
- People's Republic of China: Captured and used in the Korean War by Chinese PVA soldiers.
- France: Used during World War II by the Free French forces and during the Indochina and Algerian War
- Greece: Used by the Greek armed forces during World War II and the post-World War II period.
- Italian Partisans: Supplied with .45 ACP and 9 mm versions.
- Japan: Used by the JSDF until the adoption of the Minebea PM-9. Known to be used by JGSDF tank crews as a personal defense weapon. All guns retired by 2011.
- Kingdom of Laos: Received by the US Government during the Vietnam War 1955–1975.
- Republic of China: Lend-Leased to the National Revolutionary Army, along with the Thompson, to replace the outdated Chinese copies of the MP 18 and MP 28 submachine guns used during the Second Sino-Japanese War and the early years of the Chinese Civil War. Copies made as the Type 36 and Type 37 which the number were named after the Chinese Republican Calendar
- South Korea: The Army received 748 M3s before the Korean War. The M3 in service with the Army reached 4,565 (December 1950), 7,350 (December 1951), 23,311 (December 1952), and 39,626 (27 July 1953) units. Later used by Special Warfare Command until replaced by K1A SMG.
- Iran: Used by the Iranian Imperial Guard.
- North Vietnam: Used by Viet Cong and Viet Minh.
- South Vietnam
- Norway: 9 mm variant supplied to the Norwegian resistance during World War II by the OSS (along with the United Defense M42 submachine gun).
- Soviet Union
- United Kingdom: In use by British 78th Division after November 1944 and later used by soldiers of 41 Commando in Korea
- United States

=== Non-state actors ===
- Front for Congolese National Liberation
- New People's Army
- Provisional Irish Republican Army
- West Papua Liberation Army

== See also ==
- Halcón M-1943, Argentinian submachine gun, of similar era
- Jungle style, the practice of taping gun magazines together
- List of U.S. Army weapons by supply catalog designation SNL A-58

== Bibliography ==
- Dunlap, Roy F. (1948). Ordnance Went Up Front. Samworth Press.
- Ingram, Mike (2001). The MP40 Submachine Gun. Zenith Imprint. ISBN 978-0-7603-1014-4.
- Iannamico, Frank A. (1999). The U.S. M3-3A1 Submachine Gun. Moose Lake Publishing.
- Iannamico, Frank A. (2004). United States Submachine Guns. Moose Lake Publishing.
- Nelson, Thomas B. (1963). The World's Submachine Guns. TBN Enterprises. Reprint: ISBN 978-0-85368-481-7.
- Sazanidis, Christos (1995). Τα όπλα των Ελλήνων [Arms of the Greeks] (in Greek). Thessaloniki, Greece: Maiandros. ISBN 978-960-90213-0-2.
- Smith, Joseph E. (1969). Small Arms of the World (11th ed.). Harrisburg, Pennsylvania: The Stackpole Company. ISBN 9780811715669.
- Thompson, Leroy (19 May 2016). The M3 "Grease Gun". Weapon 46. Osprey Publishing. ISBN 978-1-4728-1107-3.
- Weeks, John (1980). WWII Small Arms. Galahad Books.
