= FP-45 Liberator =

US WWII single-shot handgun

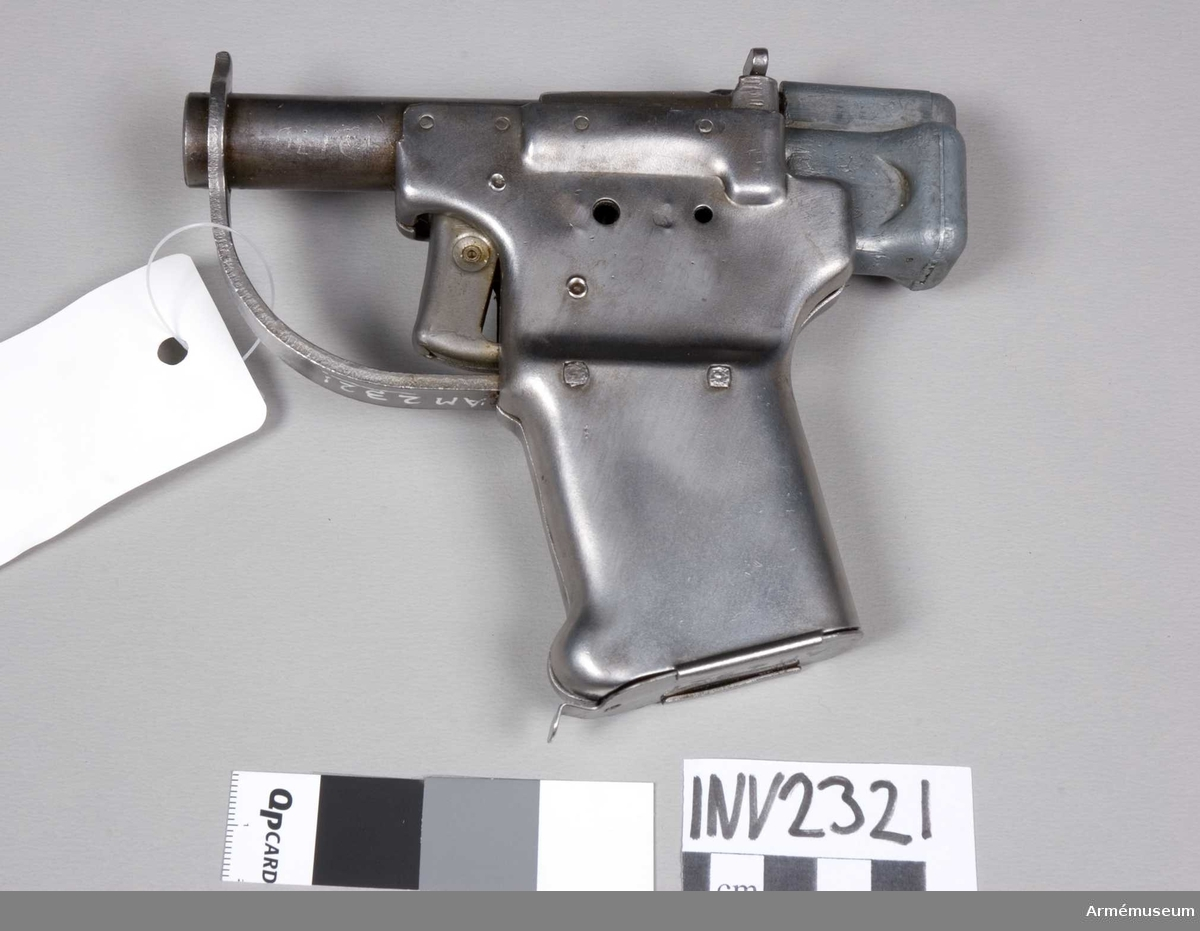
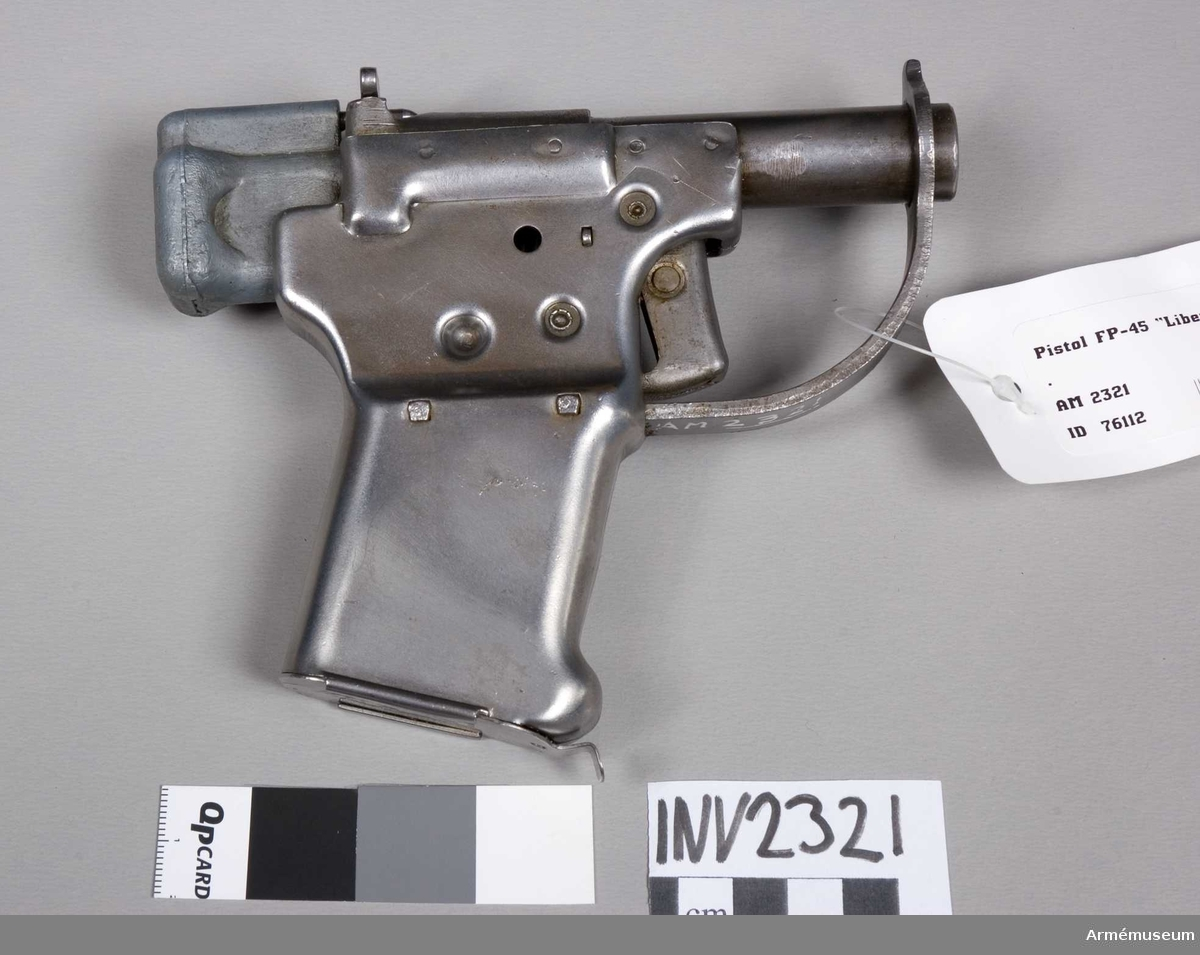
- The FP-45/M1942
- Type: Single-shot handgun, derringer
- Place of origin: United States

Service history
- In service: 1942 – 1945
- Used by: Dropped into occupied territories for use by insurgents
- Wars: World War II

Production history
- Designer: George Hyde
- Designed: May 1942
- Manufacturer: Guide Lamp Division of General Motors Corporation
- Unit cost: $2.10 USD (1942) ($42.10 USD in 2026)
- Produced: June 1942 – August 1942
- No. built: 1,000,000

Specifications
- Mass: 1 lb (450 g)
- Length: 5.55 in (141 mm)
- Barrel length: 4 in (100 mm)
- Cartridge: .45 ACP
- Action: Single-shot
- Muzzle velocity: 820 ft/s (250 m/s)
- Effective firing range: 8 yd (7.3 m)
- Feed system: Single-shot

The FP-45 Liberator is a handgun manufactured by the United States military during World War II for use by resistance forces in occupied territories. The Liberator was never issued to American or other Allied troops, and there are few documented instances of the weapon being used for its intended purpose; this was compounded by the intended recipients – irregulars and resistance fighters – rarely keeping detailed records due to the inherent risks if the records were captured by the enemy. Few FP-45 pistols were distributed as intended, and most were destroyed by Allied forces after the war.

== Project history ==
The concept was suggested by a Polish military attaché in March 1942. The project was assigned to the US Army Joint Psychological Warfare Committee and was designed for the United States Army two months later by George Hyde of the Inland Manufacturing Division of the General Motors Corporation in Dayton, Ohio. Production was undertaken by General Motors Guide Lamp Division to avoid conflicting priorities with Inland Division production of the M1 carbine. The army designated the weapon the Flare Projector Caliber .45 hence the designation FP-45. This was done to disguise the fact that a pistol was being mass-produced. The original engineering drawings labeled the barrel as "tube", the trigger as "yoke", the firing pin as "control rod", and the trigger guard as "spanner". The Guide Lamp Division plant in Anderson, Indiana assembled a million of these guns. The Liberator project took about six months from conception to the end of production with about 11 weeks of actual manufacturing time, done by 300 workers.

== Design ==
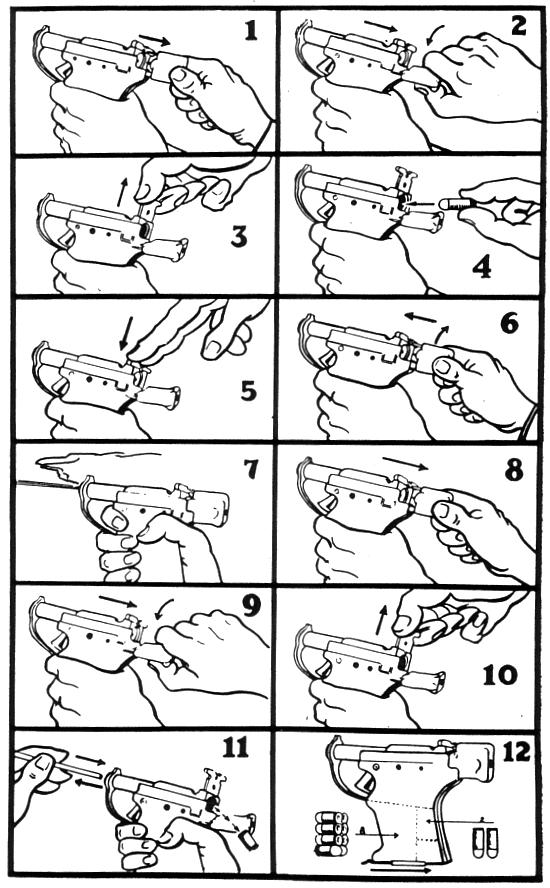
The operating instructions distributed with the FP-45

The FP-45 was a crude, single-shot pistol designed to be cheaply and quickly mass-produced. It had just 23 largely stamped and turned steel parts that were cheap and easy to manufacture. It fired the .45 ACP pistol cartridge from an unrifled barrel. Due to this limitation, it was intended for short-range use, 1–4 yards (0.91–3.66 m). Its maximum effective range was only about 25 ft (7.6 m). At longer range, the bullet would begin to tumble and stray off course. The original delivered cost for the FP-45 was USD2.10/unit (equivalent to $41 in 2025), lending it the nickname "Woolworth pistol". Ten rounds of ammunition could be stored in the pistol grip.

== Wartime use ==
The Liberator was shipped in a cardboard box with 10 rounds of .45 ACP ammunition, a wooden dowel to remove the empty cartridge case, and an instruction sheet in comic strip form showing how to load and fire the weapon. The Liberator was a crude and clumsy weapon, never intended for front-line service. It was originally intended as an insurgency weapon to be mass-dropped behind enemy lines to resistance fighters in occupied territory. A resistance fighter was to recover the gun, sneak up on an Axis occupier, kill or incapacitate him, and retrieve his weapons.

It was manufactured under the "FP" prefix and referred to in official documentation as a "Flare pistol". The pistol was valued as much for its psychological warfare effect as its actual field performance. It was believed that if vast quantities of these handguns could be delivered into Axis-occupied territory, it would have a devastating effect on the morale of occupying troops. The plan was to drop them in such great quantities that occupying forces could never capture or recover all of them. It was hoped that the thought of thousands of these unrecovered weapons potentially in the hands of the citizens of occupied countries would have a deleterious effect on enemy morale.

General Dwight D. Eisenhower's staff never saw the practicality in mass dropping the Liberator over occupied Europe, and authorized distribution of fewer than 25,000 of the half million FP-45 pistols shipped to Great Britain for the French resistance. Generals Joseph Stilwell and Douglas MacArthur were similarly unenthusiastic about the other half of the pistols scheduled for shipment to the Pacific. The Army then turned 450,000 Liberators over to the Office of Strategic Services (OSS), which preferred to supply Resistance fighters in both theatres with more effective weapons whenever possible.

French use of the FP-45 remains undocumented, however, a first-hand account of an assassination with an FP-45 exists from German military policeman Niklaus Lange. He claimed that there were thousands in circulation in occupied France. The OSS did distribute a few to Greek resistance forces in 1944. Most of the pistols shipped to Britain were undistributed, and later dumped at sea or melted for scrap metal.

One hundred thousand FP-45 pistols were shipped to China in 1943, but the number actually distributed remains unknown. A few were distributed to the Philippine Commonwealth Army, Philippine Constabulary, and resistance fighters.

== See also ==
- Deer gun, a Liberator-style handgun tested during the Vietnam War
- Liberator, a 3D printed handgun (2013)
