= Josephine English =

First Black American woman gynecologist

- Born: December 17, 1920; Ontario, Virginia
- Died: December 18, 2011 (aged 91); Brooklyn, New York
- Education: Hunter College, New York University, Meharry Medical College
- Occupation: Gynecologist

Josephine English (December 17, 1920 - December 18, 2011) was an American gynecologist who was the first black woman to open a private practice in New York. She was also known for her work in real estate and health care, in addition to her philanthropy towards the arts. Her practice was jeopardized in 1995 due to financial issues with the Adelphi Medical Center. Many of her establishments have risked foreclosure, and lacked repair funds.

== Biography ==
English was born on December 17, 1920, to Jennie English and Whittie Sr. in Ontario, Virginia. She moved to Englewood, New Jersey, in 1939. Her family was one of the first black families in Englewood. She attended Hunter College for her bachelor's degree until 1949, and earned her Master's in Psychology at New York University. She initially wanted to become a psychiatrist, but ended up choosing gynecology after discovering her interest at Meharry Medical College where she earned her medical degree in gynecology.

== Medical experience ==
English opened her practice at Harlem Hospital. Once in Brooklyn, she opened up a women's health clinic in Bushwick in 1956, as well as another in Fort Greene two decades later. During her career, English helped deliver 6,000 babies, including the children of Malcolm X, Betty Shabazz, and Lynn Nottage. In 1986, English received her license from the New York State Department of Health to establish her surgical center. She was the first minority and woman to be awarded this.

== Philanthropy ==
English's interest in health care lead her establish the Adelphi Medical Center and child care programs, such as Up the Ladder Day Care and After School Program. Her passion for theater led her to establish the Paul Robeson Theater from a dilapidated church. She helped actors create performances to educate the populace on health and nutrition.

== Death ==
English died on December 18, 2011, at 91 years old at the Dr. Susan Smith McKinney Nursing & Rehabilitation Center in Brooklyn, in Brooklyn, where she was recovering from surgery.

== Legacy ==
English won the African Community Contribution Award as well as the Lucille Mason Rose Community Activist Award. In 1996, the Josephine English Foundation was created to fund English's pursuits.
