= United Defense M42 =

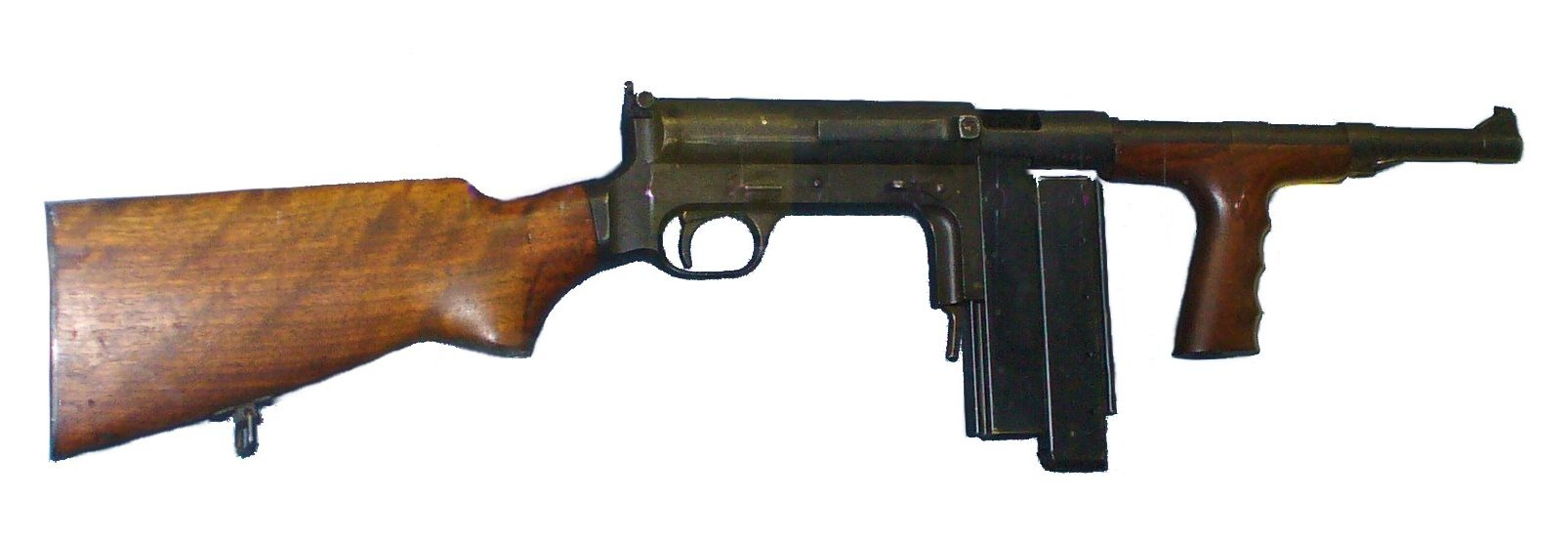
- UD M42 submachine gun with jungle style coupled magazines
- Type: Submachine gun
- Place of origin: United States

Service history
- In service: 1942-1945
- Used by: See Users
- Wars: World War II; Chinese Civil War

Production history
- Designer: Carl G. Swebilius
- Manufacturer: United Defense Supply Corp.
- Produced: 1942–1943
- No. built: 15,000

Specifications
- Mass: 4.54 kg (10.0 lb)
- Length: 820 mm (32.3 in)
- Barrel length: 279 mm (11.0 in)
- Caliber: 9×19mm Parabellum.45 ACP (Prototype model)
- Action: Blowback
- Rate of fire: 700 rpm to 1000 rpm
- Muzzle velocity: 1,100 ft/s (335.3 m/s)
- Feed system: 25-round box magazine (also issued with two 25-round magazines welded face-to-face)
- Sights: fixed front post, rear adjustable for windage

The United Defense M42, sometimes known as the Marlin for the company that did the actual manufacturing, was an American submachine gun used during World War II. It was produced from 1942 to 1943 by United Defense Supply Corp. for possible issue as a replacement for the Thompson submachine gun and was used by Office of Strategic Services (OSS) agents. However, its usage was limited, and the Thompson continued to see service until the end of the war, alongside the M3 submachine gun, which was designed around the same time as the M42.

== History ==
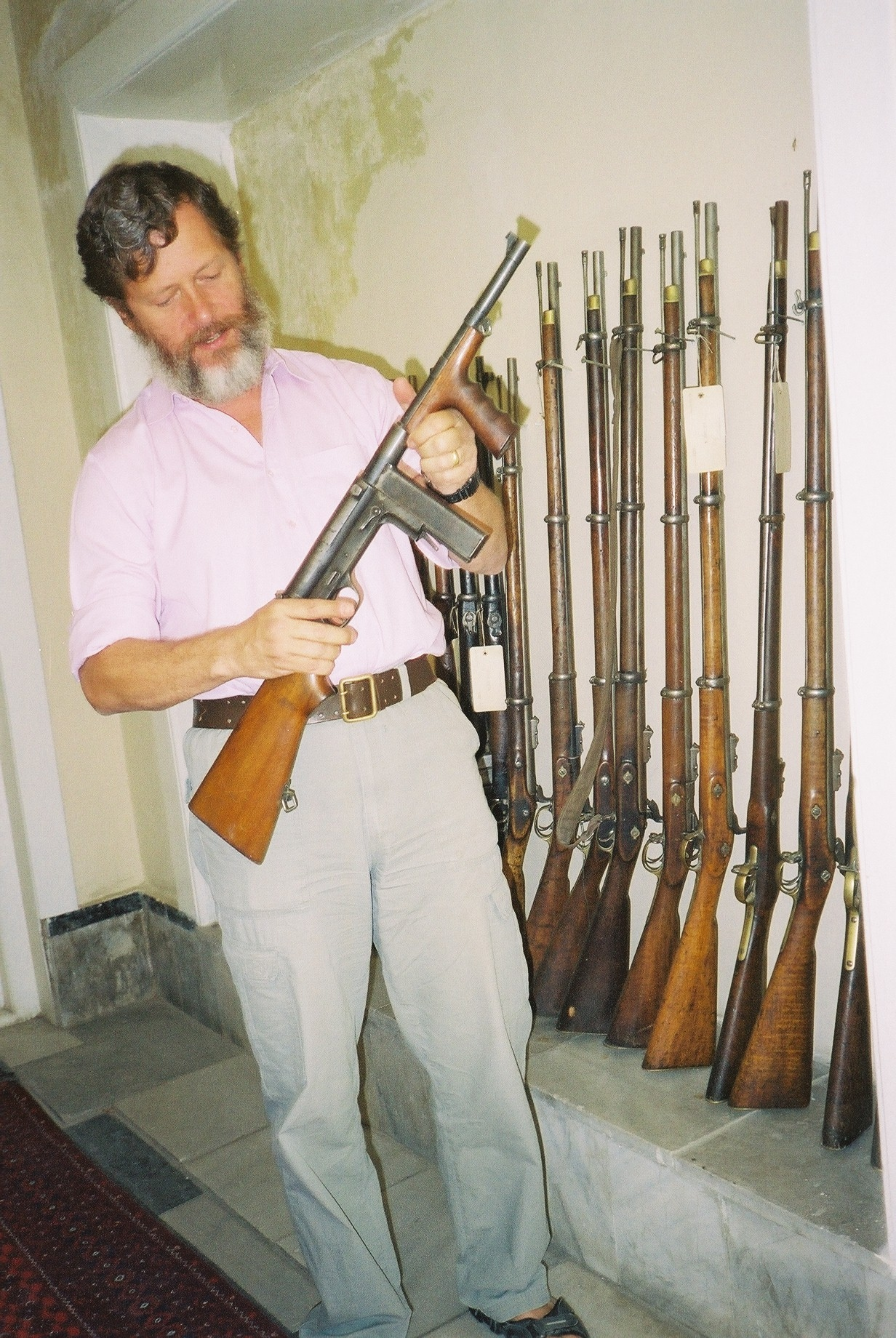
A BBC reporter inspecting an M42 at Kabul, Afghanistan in 2005.

The M42 submachine gun was designed by Carl G. Swebilius of the High Standard Manufacturing Company in 1940. When High Standard was tasked with producing .50 BMG machine guns for the British government, further development of the submachine gun was handled the United Defense Supply Corporation founded by Pope and Jackson of the British Purchasing Commission. United Defense did not have any manufacturing capability so it contracted with Marlin Firearms to have the M42 actually built.

The UD M42 was promoted as a replacement for the Thompson submachine gun, which the U.S. military considered expensive and complicated to produce. Early model Thompson drum magazines were heavy and made a rattling sound when soldiers moved around with the weapon. Prototypes were made in 9×19mm Parabellum and .45 ACP, but only the 9mm version was mass-produced. During the last three years of World War II about 15,000 9mm submachine guns were manufactured, only six .45 ACP prototype test guns were made.

The weapon comes with a 20-round magazine (25-round for the .45 ACP prototypes) designed by John E. Owsley, covered by patent 2,289,067. Frequently two 25-round magazines were welded face-to-face allowing a quick reload when the first became empty. It has a cyclic rate of 700 rounds per minute. Just like with the Sten, resistance fighters were instructed to fire in short bursts when firing in full automatic to reduce the risk of overworking the weapon that would cause jamming and overall keeping it in a good condition. They were also strongly advised to keep the double magazine clear of grass, mud, dirt and any other debris out because of the risk of jamming. The weapon weighs 10 lb (4.54 kg) when empty, with a length of 32.3 in (820 mm). The barrel length is 11 in (279 mm), and it has six-groove right-hand rifling.

An extremely simple design, it was a straight blowback, selective fire weapon. It was built under "hurry-up" war conditions and some of its design flaws stem from this approach. Problems with the weapon were varied. Under combat conditions it was found that the sheet metal magazines had a tendency to warp out of shape causing feeding problems. They had little tolerance for exposure to large amounts of mud and sand and tended to jam if not cleaned regularly. The gun was also labor-intensive to produce. It used all machined parts, no stampings, and under wartime conditions, machine work is at a premium. However, proving ground tests showed it was easier to field strip and maintain than the Thompson or Sten Mark II and was more accurate at 300 feet/100 yards (91 m). Despite its expense and precision, the UD M42 enjoyed a good reputation when used by OSS and resistance groups alike.

The War Department was interested in purchasing large quantities of the M42, but due to complicated legal issues, manufacturing rights, and royalties, only 15,000 units were purchased. The M42 submachine gun was classified as a substitute standard when the M3 submachine gun was introduced.

== Operational use ==
Intended for use by U.S. military at the time of its design, it found more favor being air-dropped to partisan forces in occupied Europe. The weapon was air dropped to supply British-led partisan forces on the island of Crete, where it was used extensively. It also saw use among other partisan forces of the Italian, Belgian, Dutch, Danish, Norwegian and French Resistance. At least 4,000 sent to US Navy installations in the Far East were transferred to Dai Li's regular resistance forces in China for use against Japanese Empire during the Japanese invasion; and some later equipped Communist Chinese soldiers. The United Defense M42 was issued for use by Filipino troops under the Philippine Army and Philippine Constabulary during World War II from 1942 through the Post-World War II era until the 1960s and was used by the local recognized guerrilla forces from 1942 to 1945 during the Japanese Occupation. In Europe, the use of the 9mm caliber allowed resistance forces to use captured German ammunition in their weapons, eliminating the need for repeated re-supply drops.

Overall the weapon failed in its intended role (to replace the Thompson) but proved effective in limited use in irregular warfare when used by resistance forces.

== Users ==
- Republic of China
- China
- Czechoslovakia: 100 pieces from US supplies used by insurgent army and partisans during Slovak National Uprising
- France: Supplied to the French Forces of the Interior.
  - Vichy France: Small number of captured examples issued to Milice française
- Belgium: Supplied to the Belgian Resistance during WW2.
- Italy: Supplied to Italian partisans during the Italian Campaign of WW2
- Netherlands: Supplied to the Dutch resistance during WW2.
- Philippines: Used by the Philippine Army and Constabulary during the Post World War II era from 1945 to 1960s and used again by the local recognized guerrillas and irregular forces from 1942 to 1945 during World War II.
- Poland: 152 pieces delivered in 1943 and 208 pieces delivered in 1944 to the Home Army by Allied aviation from North Africa and Italy
- United States
- Yugoslav Partisans: Supplied by the OSS.

=== Non-state groups ===
- Provisional Irish Republican Army: Supplied to the IRA by Greek Cypriot group EOKA.

== See also ==
- List of individual weapons of the U.S. Armed Forces

== Bibliography ==
- Nelson, Thomas B. (1963). The World's Submachine Guns, Volume I. International Small Arms Publishers.
- Iannamico, Frank. (2004). United States Submachine Guns: From the American 180 to the ZX-7. Moose Lake Publishing. ISBN 0-9742724-0-X.
- Brophy, William S. (1989). Marlin Firearms: A History of the Guns and the Company That Made Them. Stackpole Books.
