= Cacace =

Cacace (Italian pronunciation: [kaˈkaːtʃe]) is a Southern Italian surname. It originated from a Neapolitan nickname meaning "wicked", from the Medieval Greek word kakakēs. Notable people with the surname include:

- Alejandro Cacace (born 1985), Argentine politician
- Anthony Cacace (born 1989), Irish boxer
- Ezequiel Cacace (born 1984), Argentine soccer player
- Flavia Cacace (born 1980), Italian-born British dancer
- Fulvio Cacace (?–2003), Italian chemist
- Joel Cacace (born 1941), New York City mobster
- Liberato Cacace (born 2000), New Zealand soccer player
- Susan Cacace (New York) (born 1964), American politician
- Vincenza Cacace (born 1979), Italian model

== See also ==
- Cacace Chapel, a chapel in the church of San Lorenzo Maggiore, Naples
- Kachalsky v. Cacace, 2012 lawsuit
