= Second Amendment Foundation =

United States nonprofit organization that supports gun rights

- Established: 1974; 52 years ago
- Founder: Alan M. Gottlieb
- Type: Gun rights advocacy group
- Tax ID no.: 91-6184167 (EIN)
- Legal status: 501(c)(3) organization
- Headquarters: Bellevue, Washington, United States
- Location(s): 12500 Northeast 10th Place; Bellevue, WA 98005
- Region served: United States
- Members: 720,000 (2023)
- President: Massad Ayoob
- Executive Vice President: Alan M. Gottlieb
- Executive Director: Adam Kraut
- Board of directors: 9
- Affiliations: Citizens Committee for the Right to Keep and Bear Arms (CCRKBA)
- Budget: $4.3 million (2019)
- Revenue: ▲$9.08 million (2023)
- Expenses: ▲$7.82 million (2023)
- Staff: 16 (2011)
- Website: www.saf.org

The Second Amendment Foundation (SAF) is a United States nonprofit organization that supports gun rights. Founded in 1974 by Alan Gottlieb and headquartered in Bellevue, Washington, SAF publishes gun rights magazines and public education materials, funds conferences, provides media contacts, and has assumed a central role in sponsoring lawsuits.

The Citizens Committee for the Right to Keep and Bear Arms (CCRKBA) is the advocacy affiliate of the SAF. As of January 2015, both groups reported having over 650,000 members.

== Legal action ==
In 2005, the Second Amendment Foundation and the National Rifle Association of America (NRA) successfully sued New Orleans mayor Ray Nagin and others to stop gun seizures in the wake of Hurricane Katrina. On February 12, 2007, Ray Nagin and others were held in contempt of court for violating the consent order. The case is National Rifle Association of America, Inc., et al. v. C. Ray Nagin et al.

In 2005, SAF and others sued to stop the San Francisco gun ban. On June 13, 2006, San Francisco Superior Court Judge James Warren struck down the ban, saying local governments have no such authority under California law. The City appealed Judge Warren's ruling, but lost in a unanimous opinion from the three-judge panel in the Court of Appeal issued on January 9, 2008. The City then appealed to the California Supreme Court, which reached a unanimous decision on April 9, 2008, that rejected the city's appeal and upheld the lower courts' decision.

In 2006, a suit was filed in federal court against Washington state's North Central Regional Library District (NCRL). "The NCRL's policy of refusing to disable its Internet filters upon request is restricting the ability of speakers, content providers and patrons of the NCRL's public-library branches to access the contemporary marketplace of ideas" by using Internet filters on publicly available computer terminals to block access to constitutionally protected speech, including publications such as Women & Guns magazine, which is owned by SAF. It is claimed the library refuses to unblock such access even at the request of the plaintiffs. Upon certification by the District Court, the Washington Supreme Court held that a public library may, consistent with the Washington State Constitution, filter Internet access for all patrons without being obliged to disable the filter to allow access to web sites containing constitutionally protected speech upon the request of an adult library patron. Based on this ruling, the federal district court ruled in 2012 that the public library's policy, including not disabling an Internet filter at the request of an adult patron, was reasonable, was not constitutionally overbroad, and did not violate the First Amendment's content-based restrictions.

In 2008, the Second Amendment Foundation and the NRA successfully sued Washington, forcing the state to restart issuing and renewing Alien Firearms Licenses to legal resident aliens.

On June 26, 2008, following the ruling in District of Columbia v. Heller affirming an individual Second Amendment right to keep and bear arms by the Supreme Court of the United States, the Second Amendment Foundation filed a suit, known as McDonald v. Chicago, against the City of Chicago to overturn its handgun ban. Alan Gura, who successfully argued Heller before the Supreme Court, was lead counsel in this case. On June 28, 2010, the Supreme Court held in McDonald that the Second Amendment to the United States Constitution is incorporated by the Due Process Clause of the Fourteenth Amendment and applies to the states. In a noteworthy concurring opinion, Justice Clarence Thomas held that the application of the Second Amendment to the states was through the Fourteenth Amendment's Privileges or Immunities Clause.

Following the Heller decision in 2008 in which the Supreme Court of the United States held that the Second Amendment to the United States Constitution protects an individual's right to possess a firearm for private use, the Second Amendment Foundation partnered with Smith & Wesson to create a commemorative revolver. On the right side plate of the revolver, the scale of justice is depicted with the case name across the scale. The balance is in favor of the "Heller" name with the court date of "June 26, 2008" positioned across the top. Underneath the scale, the side plate reads "Second Amendment" and "The right to keep and bear arms" in white lettering. The revolver was presented to the six plaintiffs of the case.

On June 29, 2010, following the McDonald ruling by the Supreme Court that the Second Amendment is incorporated against the states, the Second Amendment Foundation, along with Grass Roots North Carolina and three North Carolina citizens, filed a federal suit in North Carolina. The suit, known as Bateman vs. Perdue, seeks to prevent local officials and local governments from declaring states of emergency under which private citizens are prohibited from exercising their right to bear arms. Alan Gura, who successfully argued Heller and McDonald before the Supreme Court, is lead counsel in this case.

In 2015, the Foundation joined Defense Distributed in a lawsuit against the U.S. Department of State, which had attempted to ban the first 3D-printed gun files from the Internet. After an appeal, and on remand to the district court in Texas, the U.S. State Department offered to settle the case to avoid a negative First Amendment ruling.

== Citizens Committee for the Right to Keep and Bear Arms ==

The Citizens Committee for the Right to Keep and Bear Arms (CCRKBA) is the sister organization and advocacy affiliate of the Second Amendment Foundation. As of January 2015, both groups reported having over 650,000 members. The CCRKBA was founded by Gottlieb in 1971, three years before he founded the SAF. The organization was formed to advocate the individualist interpretation of the Second Amendment by firearm enthusiasts who felt that the NRA was not taking a strong enough stand on gun control and gun rights.

In his capacity as chair of the Citizens Committee For The Right To Keep And Bear Arms, Alan Gottlieb expressed his support for gun control contained in the Manchin-Toomey background check amendment. In a National Public Radio interview that aired April 16, 2013. NPR host Robert Siegel is quoted saying, "The background checks proposal that Ailsa mentioned is an amendment put forward by Democrat Joe Manchin and Republican Pat Toomey. It would expand background checks to include gun shows and Internet sales. Among gun rights activists, Alan Gottlieb is a figure of consequence. So his support of the Manchin-Toomey amendment is meaningful."

== Doctors for Responsible Gun Ownership ==
Doctors for Responsible Gun Ownership is a gun-rights organization of American physicians. It was founded in 1993 by Timothy Wheeler, now Director emeritus, as a project of the Claremont Institute; as of 2016, it was a project of the Second Amendment Foundation.

Doctors for Responsible Gun Ownership (DRGO) is a network of physicians and health professionals who support the safe and lawful use of firearms. It searches and posts articles using science and medicine in dealing with firearm politics, proper use of firearms, and gun safety. It also publishes its own articles by DRGO members twice weekly. The editor of DRGO is Robert B. Young; John Edeen is media liaison and Membership Director; Arthur Z. Przebinda is DRGO Project Director. Authors and Contributors include Gary Mauser and Miguel Faria.

== Publications ==
- The Gun Mag, a monthly magazine
- Women & Guns, a bi-monthly magazine
- The Gottlieb-Tartaro Report, a monthly newsletter
- SAF Reporter, a quarterly newsletter
- Journal of Firearms and Public Policy, an annual reference book
- The New Gun Week, weekly magazine that ran for 45 years, is now "TheGunMag"

== Radio ==
The Second Amendment Foundation and the CCRKBA own a group of business talk radio stations in the Pacific Northwest.

=== Stations ===
Callsign	Freq.	City	Market
KBNP	1410 kHz	Portland, OR	Portland, OR
KGTK	920 kHz	Olympia, WA	Olympia, WA
KITZ	1400 kHz	Silverdale, WA	Seattle
KSBN	1230 kHz	Spokane, WA	Spokane, WA

== See also ==
- Kachalsky v. Cacace
- Woollard v. Gallagher
- International Association for the Protection of Civilian Arms Rights
