= Alan Gottlieb =

American writer and political activist

Alan Merril Gottlieb
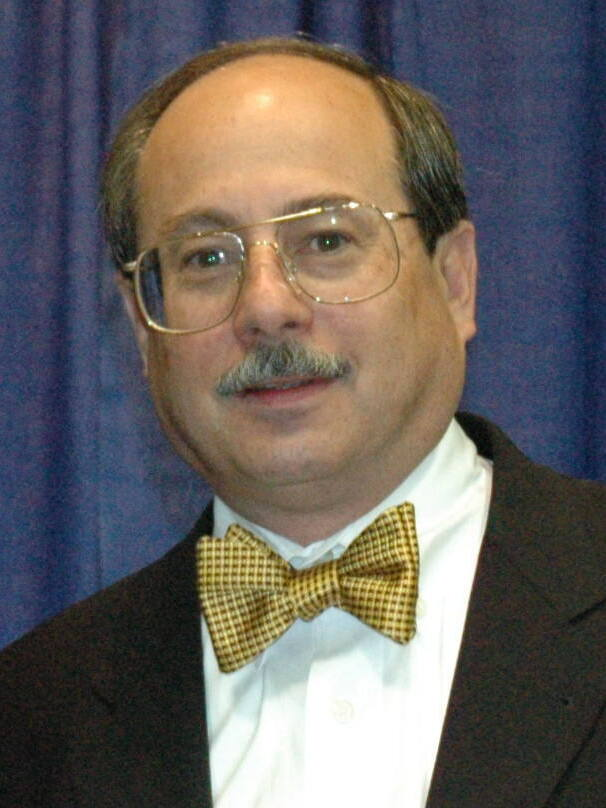
- Gottlieb in 2007
- Born: Los Angeles, California, United States
- Education: Nuclear Engineering, University of Tennessee; Institute on Comparative Political & Economic Systems, Georgetown University
- Occupations: Political Activist; Author

Alan Merril Gottlieb is an American author, conservative political activist, gun rights advocate, and businessperson. Gottlieb has published 23 books.

== Biography ==
He was born in Los Angeles and graduated from the University of Tennessee in the summer of 1971, after a five-year course, with a degree in nuclear engineering. He was indicted by a federal grand jury on charges of filing false income tax returns in 1977 and 1978 by failing to include gross receipts of $138,000 and $260,000 those two years from Merril Associates, his political fund-raising firm

Gottlieb is a defender of gun rights, and most of his 19 books are about the subject. Gottlieb is a businessman who owns several businesses whose target market is libertarian to conservative groups.

Gottlieb owns Merril Press, an "independent publisher of unusual nonfiction books by authors who know what they're writing about." He is also president of four radio stations, including KITZ in Port Orchard, Washington, KGTK in Olympia, Washington, KBNP in Portland, Oregon, and KSBN in Spokane, Washington.

Gottlieb is also the Chairman of the Citizens Committee for the Right to Keep and Bear Arms, Founder of the Second Amendment Foundation, a board member of the American Conservative Union, and President of the Center for the Defense of Free Enterprise.

In 1984, Gottlieb plead guilty to filing a tax return that was not true to every material mater and was sentenced to a year and a day in prison by U.S. District Court Judge John Coughenour. Gottlieb's right to own firearms was restored in 1985.

In 2013, Gottlieb's lobbying organization (the Citizens Committee for the Right to Keep and Bear Arms) would have backed with amendments to expand gun rights a "compromise gun registration amendment proposed by Sens. Joe Manchin and Pat Toomey." The ill-fated expanded background checks bill was overwhelmingly supported by Senate Democrats and President Barack Obama at the time. The needed gun rights amendments to gain support were blocked and the bill failed.

== Works ==
Gottlieb has published or self-published 23 books.

=== Books ===
- Gun Rights Affirmed: The Emerson Case
- Gun Rights Fact Book
- Politically Correct Guns: Please Don't Rob or Kill Me
- Celebrity Address Book
- THE GUN GRABBERS: Who are they, how they operate, where they get their money
- Things You Can Do to Defend Your Gun Rights
- She Took A Village
- Rights of Gun Owners: A Second Amendment
- The Wise Use Agenda
- Gun owner's political action manual
- Black & Blue: How Obama and the Democrats are Beating Up the Constitution

=== Books co-authored by Gottlieb ===
- George W. Bush Speaks to the Nation – George W. Bush and Alan M. Gottlieb (Merril Press, 2010; ISBN 978-0936783406)
- Trashing the Economy: How Runaway Environmentalism Is Wrecking America – Ron Arnold and Alan Gottlieb
- Guns for Women – George Flynn and Alan Gottlieb
- More Things You Can Do to Defend Your Gun Rights – by Alan Gottlieb and David Kopel
- Double Trouble: Daschle and Gephardt – Capital Hill Bullies by Alan M. Gottlieb and Dave Workman
- Politically Correct Environment by Alan M. Gottlieb, Ron Arnold, and Chuck Asay
- America Fights Back: Armed Self-defense in a Violent Age by Alan M. Gottlieb and Dave Workman
- These Dogs Don't Hunt: The Democrats' War on Guns by Alan M. Gottlieb and Dave Workman
- Assault on Weapons: The Campaign to Eliminate Your Guns by Alan M. Gottlieb and Dave Workman (2009)
- Dancing in Blood:Exposing the Gun Ban Lobby's Playbook to Destroy Your Rights by Alan Gottlieb and Dave Workman (2014)
- Right to Carry: I carry a Gun a Cop is too Heavy by Alan Gottlieb and Dave Workman (2016)
- Good Guys with Guns by Alan Gottlieb and Dave Workman (2019)
