= Society for Range Management =

International professional society for rangeland science and management

- Formation: January 29, 1948
- Type: Non-profit professional association
- Purpose: Rangeland conservation and sustainable management
- Location: Washington, D.C., U.S.
- Website: rangelands.org

The Society for Range Management is an international non-profit professional association dedicated to the conservation and sustainable management of rangelands. Its members include scientists, educators, ranchers, and land managers who advance the science and art of managing rangeland ecosystems.

== History ==
Interest in forming a professional society for range managers grew in the 1930s, partly in response to the widespread land degradation issues of the Dust Bowl era. The organization was officially founded as the American Society of Range Management at its inaugural meeting in Salt Lake City, Utah, on January 29, 1948. With 192 registered participants, the first meeting established the society's committee structure and authorized the creation of its first scientific journal.

In 1971, the organization's name was changed to the Society for Range Management to reflect its growing international membership and the global scope of rangeland ecosystems.

== Mission ==
The mission of the Society for Range Management is "to promote the professional development and continuing education of members and the public and the stewardship of rangeland resources." The society advocates for the use of ecological and economic principles to manage rangelands for a sustainable yield of products and benefits for human welfare.

== Activities ==
The society's primary activities include hosting an annual scientific meeting where members present research, share management techniques, and discuss policy issues. The society also offers professional certification programs, including the Certified Professional in Rangeland Management (CPRM), which recognizes individuals who meet high standards of education and experience. The certification is recognized by academic institutions as a source of continuing education units.

== Influence and role in land management ==
The establishment of the Society for Range Management and its journal was a key step in the professionalization of rangeland science as a distinct discipline. The society has historically had a strong influence on federal land management agencies, such as the Bureau of Land Management and the United States Forest Service. Scientific principles published by the society are often incorporated into the technical references and guidelines used by federal agencies for rangeland monitoring and assessment.

== Conservation context ==
The Society for Range Management operates from a conservation philosophy centered on sustainable use. This approach has its roots in the Progressive Era conservation movement, which advocated for the efficient and scientific management of natural resources for long-term human benefit. This philosophy, often referred to as wise use or multiple-use, seeks to balance ecological health with economic activities like livestock grazing. This approach is distinct from preservationist philosophies held by some other environmental organizations that may advocate for the reduction or removal of livestock grazing from public lands to prioritize biodiversity and the protection of natural ecosystems. Some academic and environmental critics have argued that the profession of range management has historically prioritized livestock production over other ecological values, such as wildlife habitat and watershed integrity.

== Publications ==
The Society for Range Management publishes two primary journals for the dissemination of rangeland science and management information.

Rangeland Ecology & Management: A peer-reviewed scientific journal that has been published since 1948. It was originally titled the Journal of Range Management until 2005. It serves as a forum for scholarly research on the ecology, management, and use of rangelands.

Rangelands: A full-color, peer-reviewed publication that features articles on applied science, management, policy, education, and social issues related to rangelands, intended for a broader audience including land managers, students, and producers.
