= Woollard v. Gallagher =

Civil lawsuit

- Court: United States Court of Appeals for the Fourth Circuit
- Full case name: Raymond Woollard, et al. v. Denis Gallagher, et al.
- Argued: October 24, 2012
- Decided: March 21, 2013
- Citation: 712 F.3d 865

Case history
- Prior history: Woollard v. Sheridan, 863 F. Supp. 2d 462 (D. Md. 2012)
- Subsequent history: Cert. denied, 571 U.S. 952 (2013).

Court membership
- Judges sitting: Robert Bruce King, Andre M. Davis, Albert Diaz

Case opinions
- Majority: King, joined by unanimous

Laws applied
- U.S. Const. amend. II

Woollard v. Sheridan, 863 F. Supp. 2d 462 (D. Md. 2012), reversed sub. nom., Woollard v Gallagher, 712 F.3d 865 (4th Cir. 2013), was a civil lawsuit brought on behalf of Raymond Woollard, a resident of the State of Maryland, by the Second Amendment Foundation against Terrence Sheridan, Secretary of the Maryland State Police, and members of the Maryland Handgun Permit Review Board. Plaintiffs allege that the Defendants' refusal to grant a concealed carry permit renewal to Mr. Woollard on the basis that he "...ha[d] not demonstrated a good and substantial reason to wear, carry or transport a handgun as a reasonable precaution against apprehended danger in the State of Maryland" was a violation of Mr. Woollard's rights under the Second and Fourteenth Amendments, and therefore unconstitutional. The trial court found in favor of Mr. Woollard, However, the Fourth Circuit Court of Appeals reversed the trial court and the U.S. Supreme Court declined to review that decision.

The case is notable as being the first direct challenge to a "may-issue" concealed carry firearms law in the United States, and also for being uncommon among challenges to U.S. firearms law in that the plaintiffs were successful in federal District Court, rather than requiring appeal to a Circuit Court of Appeals or the Supreme Court before a decision was handed down in the plaintiffs' favor.

== Background ==
The State of Maryland currently prohibits the carry of firearms, be it concealed or open, without a permit issued to the person by the State. These permits are currently issued on a discretionary basis, beyond the federal prohibitions on for example former mental patients and domestic abusers owning lethal guns, (so-called "may-issue" licensing), based upon, in part, a finding that the applicant "has good and substantial reason to wear, carry, or transport a handgun, such as a finding that the permit is necessary as a reasonable precaution against apprehended danger."

In 2002, Raymond Woollard was the victim of a home invasion in Baltimore County by his son-in-law, Kris Lee Abbot. Subsequent to this crime, he applied for and was granted a concealed carry permit in 2003, and a renewal was granted in 2006 after Abbot, having violated his probation from the home invasion, was released from prison. However, in 2009, a second renewal application by Woollard was denied on the grounds that Woollard had failed to provide evidence of a continuing threat to his safety. Woollard appealed to the Maryland Handgun Permit Review Board, and was again denied; the Board stating that Woollard "...ha[d] not submitted any documentation to verify threats occurring beyond his residence, where he can already legally carry a handgun."

The suit was filed on June 29, 2010, in United States District Court for the District of Maryland, contesting that "Maryland's handgun permitting scheme is facially violative of both the Second Amendment and the Equal Protection Clause of the Fourteenth Amendment." The Plaintiffs sought relief in the form of the removal of the "good and substantial reason" requirement of Maryland's firearm laws. As the facts of the case were not in dispute, both parties petitioned the Court for summary judgment on their behalf. Alan Gura, who successfully argued District of Columbia v. Heller and McDonald v. Chicago before the U.S. Supreme Court, argued the case pro hac vice for the plaintiffs.

== District Court Decision ==
In an opinion dated March 2, 2012, District Judge Benson Legg granted summary judgment in favor of the Plaintiffs. The Court declined to consider Plaintiffs' arguments based on the Equal Protection Clause, instead deciding based on the arguments of the Second Amendment violations. The decision refers to District of Columbia v. Heller, and to relevant post-Heller lower court decisions such as U.S. v. Chester (628 F.3d 673, 4th Cir. 2010) and U.S. v Masciandaro (638 F.3d 459, 4th Cir. 2010) and found that application of intermediate scrutiny is called for; "In order to prevail, the State must demonstrate that the challenged regulation is reasonably adapted to a substantial governmental interest."

The Court found that, under this standard, the Maryland law requiring "good and substantial reason" was overly broad; it did not specifically prohibit persons such as convicted criminals or the mentally ill, or even individuals "whose conduct indicates that he or she is potentially a danger to the public if entrusted with a handgun", as is found in the laws of other "may-issue" states. The law is instead, as the Defendants admitted to in oral arguments, a rationing system intended solely to reduce the number of firearms carried, by restricting the "privilege" based on a demonstrated need beyond a general desire for self-defense. The Court found that while the Defendants articulated many compelling reasons why limiting firearms is in the interest of public safety, the "good reason" requirement did little to combat any of the situations offered; an applicant who has "good reason" to carry a firearm may still have it forcibly removed or stolen from their person, may still cause a negligent discharge or other accidental injury, and may still use the gun in a criminal manner. In fact, Maryland's law, the decision states, "places firearms in the hands of those most likely to use them in a violent situation by limiting the issuance of permits to 'groups of individuals who are at greater risk than others of being the victims of crime.'"

Summary judgment was entered in favor of the Plaintiffs; however, a temporary stay was granted by the trial court, and Judge Legg heard oral arguments on May 23 to determine if that stay will be continued while the State appeals the decision to the 4th Circuit Court of Appeals. On July 23, 2012, Judge Legg issued an order dissolving the temporary stay on his previous injunction, effective 14 days after the issuance of said order.

== Fourth Circuit Court of Appeals ==
The appeal was filed by the defendants in the Fourth Circuit Court of Appeals on April 6, 2012, as Woollard v Gallagher (12-1437). Denis Gallagher is a member of the Maryland Handgun Permit Review Board and was a co-defendant at the District level. Terrence Sheridan remains a co-defendant/appellant.

On August 2, 2012, the Fourth Circuit granted Maryland's motion for a stay pending the outcome of this appeal. This overruled the District Court's order that would have lifted the stay effective August 7.

Oral arguments in the case were heard on October 24, 2012, beginning at 9:30 before Panel 1 of the Court. During the hearing, questions were posed to both lawyers from the bench about the appropriateness of Woollard filing suit in Federal court challenging a ruling by a state agency, an action subject to the application of the Younger abstention and Rooker-Feldman doctrines. Questions were also posed as to the curiousness of Maryland's statute only prohibiting handguns and not long guns; Appellants asserted that the permitting law was put in place in response to a problem with handgun violence; that handguns were overwhelmingly the weapon of choice for criminals and the law was enacted to control this problem.

On March 21, 2013, the Fourth Circuit unanimously reversed the District Court opinion. The Circuit Court found that the trial court's judgment hinged on a finding that the rights of the Second Amendment extend outside one's own home, and that the right is "impermissibly burdened" by the "good and substantial cause" requirement. The Court found that, while the "good cause" requirement does indeed infringe upon Woollard's Second Amendment rights, the requirement nevertheless passes intermediate scrutiny (the standard previously determined applicable in Masciandaro and Chester, heard by the same Circuit), by holding that Maryland's desire to reduce handgun violence is a "substantial government interest", and that the "good cause" requirement is "reasonably fitted" to this interest in several ways, primarily by reducing the number of guns on the street, which the Court agreed with the Appellants provides several secondary effects that significantly reduce handgun violence and increase the ability of the police to distinguish criminals from law-abiding citizens. En banc appeal to the full Circuit Court was denied.

== United States Supreme Court ==
The Second Amendment Foundation filed a Writ of Certiorari with the SCOTUS for this case July 9, 2013. Respondent Gallagher filed a response brief on September 9, 2013. Several amici briefs, all in favor of Petitioner, have been filed. The case was scheduled for a conference on October 11, 2013, which were talking about "the state’s requirement that applicants for gun permits show “good and substantial reason". Hence, the petition was denied on October 15, 2013.

== Related cases ==
- District of Columbia v. Heller - The SCOTUS held that the rights enumerated in the Second Amendment apply to the individual, and that a ban on the possession of "functional firearms" by a resident of the District of Columbia is unconstitutional.
- McDonald v. Chicago - The SCOTUS held that rights enumerated by the Second Amendment apply to all citizens of the United States and equivalently residents of the several States; as such, States may not infringe upon the Second Amendment rights of the People.
- Kachalsky v. Cacase - a case similar in subject matter to Woollard, where plaintiffs Alan Kachalsky, Christina Nikolov, and the SAF seek an injunction barring the State of New York from enforcing its "good cause" requirement for the issue of concealed carry permits. Alan Gura represented the plaintiffs pro hac vice in this case as well, which was recently denied certiorari before the Supreme Court.
- Moore v. Madigan, a case from Illinois where the Seventh Circuit reversed lower courts and held that the Plaintiffs' Second Amendment right to carry a handgun in self-defense was infringed by Illinois' "no-issue" handgun permitting laws.

== See also ==
- Concealed carry in the United States
- Gun laws in Maryland
