= ALRA =

ALRA may refer to:

- Academy of Live and Recorded Arts, British drama school
- Aboriginal Land Rights Act 1976, Australia
- Abortion Law Reform Association, now Abortion Rights (organisation), British campaign group
- American Land Rights Association, private property rights advocacy organization
