= KUTI =

Simulcast with KBRD
- Lacey, Washington; United States
- Broadcast area: Olympia, Washington
- Frequency: 680 kHz
- Branding: K-Bird

Programming
- Format: Traditional pop

Ownership
- Owner: BJ & Skip's For the Music

History
- First air date: March 7, 1994
- Former call signs: KNTE (1994–1994); KLDY (1994–1995); KBRD (1995–2025

Technical information
- Licensing authority: FCC
- Facility ID: 26893
- Class: D
- Power: 250 watts (daytime only)
- Transmitter coordinates: 47°3′44.00″N 122°49′49.00″W
- Translator: 101.1 K266BM (Olympia)

Links
- Public license information: Public file; LMS
- Webcast: Listen live
- Website: www.kbrd.org

KUTI (680 AM) is a non-commercial radio station licensed to serve Lacey, Washington, United States, and covering the Olympia area, operating only during the daytime hours. Owned by the BJ & Skip's for the Music foundation—a non-profit 501(c)3 organization where donations are tax-deductible—it features a nostalgia radio format branded as "K-Bird".

KUTI is simulcast on KBRD (920 AM) in Olympia and relayed around the clock over low-power FM translator K266BM at 101.1 MHz in Olympia.

== History ==
The station signed on the air on March 7, 1994, as KNTE. On October 7, 1994, the station changed its call letters to KLDY. On February 17, 1995, it switched to KBRD.

Larry "Skip" Morrow owned an FM radio station but was interested in also owning an AM station. When he purchased the station's construction permit, he didn't have enough radio equipment to go on the air. He was also interested in securing the KBRD call sign. When the station was ready to sign on, the call letters belonged to someone else, so the station began as KLDY. When the KBRD call sign became available, Morrow transferred the KLDY call letters to his Classical music AM station at 1280, clearing the way for 680 KBRD.

KBRD was named for BJ, Morrow's Moluccan cockatoo, whom he described as the "music director". If BJ danced to the music, it was put on KBRD's playlist. Morrow ran both KBRD and his FM radio station from his living room. Ten years after KBRD went on the air, Morrow died of cancer. Before his death, he transferred ownership of the radio station to a foundation he created: BJ and Skip's for The Music Foundation. The station is now run by Adrian DeBee (music) and Jack Ondracek (engineering).

In 2025, the facilities of KGTK (920 AM) were donated to the BJ and Skip's For the Music Foundation. The KBRD call sign was moved to 920 on July 1, 2025, with 680 changing to KUTI.

== Format ==
Although officially described as a "nostalgia" station, KBRD plays an eclectic mixture of jazz, rock, swing, country, dixieland, ragtime, zydeco, western swing, novelty and other music, much of which is not available on commercial radio stations.

A typical hour broadcast on KBRD might contain music by Artie Shaw, Aunt Dinah's Quilting Party, Bessie Smith, Boots Randolph, the Clicquot Club Eskimos, Captain Stubby and the Buccaneers, Bing Crosby, the Harmonicats, Sheb Wooley, Marty Robbins, Jelly Roll Morton, Nat King Cole, the Korn Kobblers, George Formby, Nana Mouskouri, Perry Como, Merle Travis, Louis Armstrong and the Hoosier Hot Shots.

KBRD broadcasts without commercial interruption. It seeks donations on the air and on its website.
