= Mimi Rocah =

American attorney

District Attorney of Westchester County
- In office January 4, 2021 – December 31, 2024
- Preceded by: Anthony Scarpino
- Succeeded by: Susan Cacace

Personal details
- Born: July 28, 1970 (age 56) Chicago, Illinois, U.S.
- Party: Democratic
- Spouse: David Anders (m. 2007)
- Education: Harvard University (BA); New York University (JD)
- Website: mimirocah.com

Miriam Elizabeth "Mimi" Rocah (born July 28, 1970) is an American attorney who formerly served as District Attorney for Westchester County, New York. In 2020, Rocah defeated incumbent Democrat Anthony Scarpino in a primary challenge and went on to win in the General election.

Since taking office, Rocah has been particularly vocal in combating public corruption, governmental misconduct, substance abuse, and gun violence. Rocah has also promised to pursue criminal justice reform in Westchester County.

In October 2023, Rocah announced that she would not seek re-election for Westchester County District Attorney in 2024, but that she would serve out the rest of her term.

== Education and early career ==
Rocah graduated magna cum laude from Harvard University with a Bachelor of Arts degree in American history in 1992. She later obtained a Juris Doctor from New York University Law School, where she joined the Order of the Coif honors society.

Rocah started her legal career as a clerk for United States Eastern District Judge John Gleeson and later, Chester J. Straub, United States Court of Appeals for the Second Circuit. She later took a position as a litigation associate at Cravath, Swaine & Moore law firm.

In February 2001, Rocah became an Assistant United States Attorney for the Southern District of New York under U.S. Attorney Mary Jo White. From 2012 to 2017, Rocah led the Justice Department's division for Westchester County after being promoted by U.S. Attorney Preet Bharara. In 2016, Rocah received the 2016 Women In Federal Law Enforcement Leadership Award from the Department of Justice. Rocah worked as an Assistant U.S. Attorney for the Southern District of New York for over sixteen years, leaving in 2017.

Rocah was also a Distinguished Fellow in Criminal Justice and professor at the Elisabeth Haub School of Law at Pace University.

Rocah was also a legal analyst for both MSNBC and NBC News, where she frequently criticized then-President Donald Trump. She made her campaign announcement for Westchester County District Attorney on a segment for the show Morning Joe on MSNBC News.

== Political career ==
In December 2019, Rocah announced she would launch a primary challenge against incumbent Westchester County District Attorney Anthony Scarpino, a fellow Democrat. She won the primary election and was endorsed by Scarpino against Republican candidate Bruce Bendish.

Six weeks before the General election was held, Bendish suspended his campaign for district attorney citing 'certain realities' in the race, clearing the way for Rocah to win the election. Rocah won the 2020 election for Westchester County District Attorney and was sworn in by her former employer, Preet Bharara, in January 2021.

Since taking office, Rocah has launched numerous campaigns and policies aimed at combating government impunity and criminal justice reform. In July 2021, Rocah announced her office would dismiss all open cannabis possession cases and limited their prosecution going forward. She also garnered national press after requesting evidence on New York State Governor Andrew Cuomo, following a state attorney general's report indicating he committed multiple acts of sexual harassment.

== Personal life ==
Rocah lives in Scarsdale, New York, with her husband David Brian Anders, an attorney and partner at Wachtell, Lipton, Rosen & Katz. Rocah’s father is a Holocaust survivor, and she is a proud Jew.

== Electoral history ==
2020 Westchester County District Attorney election
Primary election
Party	Candidate	Votes	%
Democratic	Mimi Rocah	70,772	71.78
Democratic	Anthony A Scarpino Jr (Incumbent)	27,823	28.22
Total votes		98,595	100.00
General election
Democratic	Mimi Rocah	263,150	62.95
Working Families	Mimi Rocah	19,354	4.63
Total	Mimi Rocah	282,504	67.58
Republican	Bruce P Bendish	135,512	32.42
Total	Bruce P Bendish	135,512	32.42
Total votes		418,016	100.00
Democratic hold			
