= Ron Arnold =

American writer and activist (1937–2022)

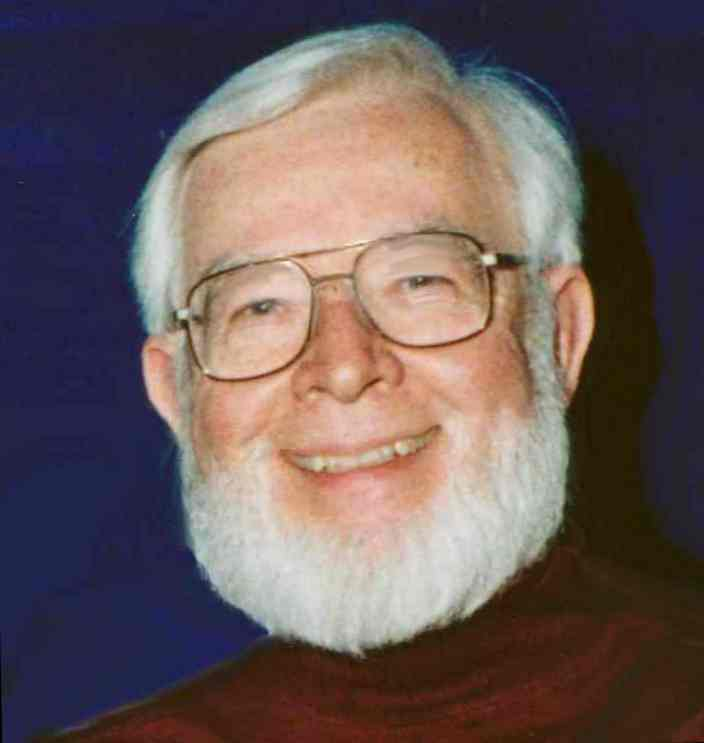
Ron Arnold

Ronald Henri Arnold (August 8, 1937 – January 22, 2022) was an American writer and activist. He was the Executive Vice-President of the Center for the Defense of Free Enterprise. He wrote frequently on natural resource issues and was an opponent of the environmental movement. Critics saw Arnold as promoting abuse of the environment, typified in an assessment by Wild Wilderness executive director Scott Silver: "Fifteen years after creating his 25 Point Wise-Use Agenda, an agenda prescribing unrestrained, unregulated and unconscionable abuse of the American commons, Ron Arnold is within striking distance of checking off every agenda item on his list." A key U.S. Senate staffer writing in 2011 noted his impact on federal legislation.

== Biography ==
Arnold was born in Houston, Texas and studied business administration at the University of Texas at Austin and the University of Washington. He died on January 24, 2022.

=== Career ===
Arnold worked as a technical writer for the Boeing Company from 1961 until he left in 1971 to found Northwoods Studio. In 1974 he began contributing to Western Conservation Journal, which exposed him to the effects of litigation related to environmental issues upon logging and mining industries. Between 1978 and 1981, Arnold was a contributing editor of Logging Management Journal. His 1979 magazine series, "The Environmental Battle", analyzed the utilization / preservation conflict, and won the American Business Press 1980 Editorial Achievement Award.

In 1981, Arnold wrote the authorized biography of Interior Secretary James G. Watt. Between 1982 and 1990, he wrote a weekly column for the Bellevue (Washington) Journal-American. In 1987, he founded the Free Enterprise Press, later merged into Merril Press, and began writing a series of books on the environmental movement. His EcoTerror was included in the "100 Best Nonfiction Books of the 20th Century" Random House / Modern Library Reader's List.

Arnold also uncovered the identity of the actual founder of the United States National Forest after a century of mystery shrouded the origin in conflicting claims. An almost forgotten politician named William S. Holman created the concept and the initial legislation, as revealed in documents Arnold discovered in the National Archives. He was invited to present his findings at the centennial symposium of the United States Forest Service in 1991.

Environmentalists have challenged Arnold's “Wise Use Movement,” launched at a Reno, Nevada conference in 1988, as inappropriately co-opting the term from utilitarian conservationist and first Chief of the U.S. Forest Service, Gifford Pinchot, who held different views on man and nature than Arnold and his movement. Arnold readily admits the borrowing, but disputes arguments that it is improper, a controversy that continues unresolved.

He mobilized political allies to protests, as covered by ABC News Nightline (broadcast February 24, 1994) by using case histories of environmentalist excesses in influencing policymakers to adopt his ideas. Certain policies of President George W. Bush have been attributed to Arnold's influence. Playboy magazine's May 2004 issue featured a profile of Arnold in the Playboy Forum, by reporter Dean Kuypers. Titled, "Guru of Wise Use," its headline read: "The spiritual father of the Bush administration's environmental policies says we shouldn't be timid about timber."

Arnold built a network of academic colleagues to help analyze large-scale social movements, and told the Boston Globe that environmentalism is "the third great wave of messianism to hit the planet, after Christianity and Marxism-Leninism." The Globe commented, "'Wise users' charge that the environmental crisis has been largely trumped up as an excuse to take control of the nation's natural resources."

Arnold's conclusion that movements of social change, including environmentalism, are fundamentally a kind of war was examined and found valid by sociologist Luther P. Gerlach in the RAND research document, "Networks and Netwars."

Arnold ran the Left Tracking Library, a site that tracks what it claims to be undue influence by left-wing politicians and environmentalists.

In late 2010, Arnold began writing a weekly column for The Washington Examiner; one was placed in the Congressional Record in early 2011. Another was used as source material by Sen. John Barrasso (R-WY) in a Senate confirmation hearing in December 2013.

== Bibliography ==
- At the Eye of the Storm: James Watt and the Environmentalists, Regnery Gateway (1982), 282 pp. ISBN 978-0895266347.
- The Grand Prairie Years: A Biography of W.C. Perry, Introduction by Gov. John B. Connally, Merril Press (October 1987), 722 pp. ISBN 978-0936783017.
- Ecology Wars: Environmentalism as if People Matter, Merril Press (January 1, 2010), 182 pp. ISBN 978-0939571147.
- Trashing the Economy: How Runaway Environmentalism is Wrecking America, Second Edition, co-authored with Alan Gottlieb, Merril Press (January 1, 2010), 670 pp. ISBN 978-0939571178.
- Politically Correct Environment co-authored with Alan Gottlieb, Merril Press (January 1, 2010), 178 pp. ISBN 978-0936783154.
- EcoTerror: The Violent Agenda to Save Nature: The World of the Unabomber, Merril Press (January 1, 2010), 324 pp. ISBN 978-0939571185.
- Undue Influence: Wealthy Foundations, Grant Driven Environmental Groups, and Zealous Bureaucrats That Control Your Future, Merril Press (October 1, 1999), 344 pp. ISBN 978-0939571208.
- Freezing in the Dark: Money, Power, Politics and The Vast Left Wing Conspiracy, Merril Press (November 30, 2007), 444 pp. ISBN 978-0-936783-51-2.
