= Gun laws in Maryland =

Location of Maryland in the United States

Gun laws in Maryland regulate the sale, possession, and use of firearms and ammunition in the U.S. state of Maryland.

== Summary table ==
Subject / law	Long guns	Handguns	Relevant statutes	Notes
State permit required to purchase?	No	Yes	Md Public Safety Article Section 5-117.1	A Handgun Qualification License is required, unless exempted (Active Duty/Retired Military with identification cards, Active/Retired Law Enforcement with department credentials, Federal Firearms Licensees); training is required, unless exempted; fingerprints are required; background checks are required; does not invalidate the requirement to perform a comprehensive background check for every handgun purchase transaction.
Firearm registration?	No	Yes		The state police maintain a permanent record of all handgun transfers. Automatic weapons must be registered with the state police.
Owner license required?	No	No		
Permit required for concealed carry?	N/A	Yes		Maryland is a de jure "may issue" state for concealed carry, but in light of the Supreme Court's decision in New York State Rifle & Pistol Association, Inc. v. Bruen, Governor Larry Hogan directed law enforcement to cease enforcement of the "good and substantial reason" requirement to obtain a concealed carry permit. As a result, Maryland is de facto a "shall issue" state.
Permit required for open carry?	No	Yes		Open carry is permitted with a carry license, but is not generally practiced except by uniformed private security officers. Though this is subjective with the issuance of shall-issue permits now. Long guns and antique handguns may be carried openly without a license.
State preemption of local restrictions?	Yes	Yes		Maryland has state preemption for most but not all firearm laws.
"Assault weapon" law?	Yes	Yes	Md Criminal Law Article Section 4-303; Firearms Safety Act of 2013	Certain models of firearms are banned as "assault pistols" and "assault long guns". It is illegal to possess an "assault weapon" or a copycat weapon with two or more specified features (folding stock, grenade/flare launcher, flash suppressor) unless owned before 10/1/2013, or received through inheritance from a lawful possessor and not otherwise forbidden to possess. Some local counties have adopted Second Amendment sanctuary resolutions in opposition to assault weapon laws.
Magazine capacity restriction?	Yes	Yes		Illegal to purchase, sell or manufacture magazines with a capacity of greater than 10 rounds within Maryland. However, possession of magazines greater than 10 rounds is legal if purchased out of state. These may not, however, be transferred to a subsequent owner unless done so outside the state of Maryland.
NFA weapons restricted?	No	No		Automatic firearms, SBSs, and SBRs must be owned in compliance with federal law. Law is silent in regards to DDs, suppressors, and AOWs.
Background checks required for private sales?	Yes	Yes	GAM Public Safety, §5-124	All private transfers of firearms must be processed through a licensed dealer or designated law enforcement agency which must conduct a background check on the buyer.
Red flag law?	Yes	Yes		

Gun laws in Maryland

Constitution
- Constitution sections: Constitution of Maryland, Declaration of Rights.
- Synopsis Art. 28. That a well regulated Militia is the proper and natural defence of a free Government.

Preemption and local regulation
- Preemption sections: Criminal Law – §4–209. Public Safety – § 5–133. Public Safety – § 5–134.
- Synopsis: Local governments are prohibited from regulating the purchase, sale, taxation, transfer, manufacture, repair, ownership, possession and transportation of handguns, rifles, shotguns and ammunition, with some exceptions.; Local governments are prohibited from regulating possession, sale, rental, or transfer of "regulated firearms."; Regulated firearms are handguns and specific assault weapons and their copies.; Localities may regulate the purchase, sale, transfer, ownership, possession and transportation of such firearms and ammunition with respect to minors; law enforcement officials of the local government; and activities in or within 100 yards of "a park, church, school, public building, and other place of public assembly."; Localities may regulate the discharge of firearms, but not at "established ranges."; Localities may regulate the sale of trigger locks with handguns.; To the extent that a local law does not create an inconsistency with this section or expand existing regulatory control, a county, municipal corporation, or special taxing district may exercise its existing authority to amend any local law that existed on or before December 31, 1984.
- Local regulation sections: See below for existing local regulations.

Registration
- Ownership registration sections: Criminal Law – §4-401. Criminal Law – § 4-403. Criminal Law – § 4-301. Criminal Law – § 4-303.
- Synopsis: Machine guns must be registered with the State yearly.; Assault pistols are prohibited; except: Assault pistols lawfully possessed before June 1, 1994 and registered before August 1, 1994.
- Purchase registration sections: Public Safety – § 5–101. Public Safety – § 5–123. Annapolis City – § 11.44.030
- Synopsis: "Regulated firearm" means: 1. a handgun; or 2. specific assault weapons or their copies; The Secretary [of the Maryland State Police] shall maintain a permanent record of all notifications received of completed sales, rentals, and transfers of regulated firearms in the State.; Annapolis requires dealers to keep a register of persons purchasing ammunition and certain firearms, along with the make, model, caliber, and date.

Restricted or prohibited items
- Restricted firearms sections: Criminal Law – § 4-301. Criminal Law – § 4-303.
- Synopsis: Assault pistols are prohibited; except: Assault pistols lawfully possessed before June 1, 1994 and registered before August 1, 1994.
- Restricted accessories sections: Criminal Law – § 4-305.
- Synopsis: Detachable magazines with a capacity of more than 10 rounds of ammunition may not be made, sold, purchased, or transferred. Possession is not prohibited.; This law does not apply to .22 caliber rifles with tubular magazines that have a capacity of more than 10 rounds of ammunition.

Restricted or prohibited places
- Restricted places sections: Criminal Law – § 4-102. Criminal Law – § 4-208. Transportation – § 5-1008. Criminal Law – § 4-405. Anne Arundel County- § 9-1-601. Baltimore City – Art 19. § 59–1; Gaithersburg City – § 15–16. Montgomery County – § 57–10. Montgomery County – § 57–11.
- Synopsis: Public school property, except certain persons.; Demonstrations in a public place or in a vehicle within 1,000 feet of such demonstrations, except certain persons.; Aircraft engaged in certificated air commerce services, except certain persons or in compliance with certain rules.; Machine guns generally may not be possessed outside of one's permanent residence or business occupancy, except certain persons.; Anne Arundel County: the property of another without signed, written permission of the owner, occupant, or lessee.; Baltimore City: firearms with barrels over 14" in length on one's person or in a vehicle within the city, except certain persons, certain firearms, or in compliance with certain rules.; City of Gaithersburg: pistols, revolvers, or other dangerous weapons on the streets of the city, except unloaded firearms used for hunting.; Montgomery County: firearms on one's person or in a vehicle, except certain persons, or in certain circumstances, or in compliance with certain rules.; Montgomery County: in or within 100 yards of a place of public assembly, except certain persons or in compliance with certain rules.

Restricted or prohibited persons
- Underage persons sections: Public Safety – § 5–101. Public Safety – § 5–133. Public Safety – § 5–134.
- Synopsis: Persons who are under 21 years of age, with some exceptions for hunting and target shooting.
- Restricted persons sections: Public Safety – § 5–101. Public Safety – § 5–133. Public Safety – § 5–134.
- Synopsis: Fugitives from justice.; Habitual drunkards.; Addicts or habitual users of any controlled dangerous substance.; Persons suffering from a mental disorder and have a history of violent behavior; unless he possesses a physician's certificate.; Persons who have been confined for more than 30 consecutive days to a mental health facility; unless he possesses a physician's certificate.; Persons who are visibly under the influence of alcohol or drugs may not purchase a firearm.; Persons who have not completed a certified firearms safety training course may not purchase a "regulated firearm."; Participants in a "straw purchase."; Persons subject to a "non ex parte civil protective order."
- Convicted persons sections: Public Safety – § 5–101. Public Safety – § 5–133. Public Safety – § 5–134.
- Synopsis: Persons who have been convicted of a crime of violence, any Maryland-classified felony, conspiracy to commit a felony, a common law crime for which the person received a term of imprisonment for more than two years, or any Maryland-classified misdemeanor that carries a statutory penalty of more than two years.; Persons under 30 years of age who have been adjudicated delinquent by a juvenile court for an act that would be a disqualifying crime if committed by an adult.

Manufacturing
- Manufacturing regulations sections: Public Safety – § 5–402. Public Safety – § 5–406. Public Safety – § 5–131. Criminal Law – § 4-305.
- Synopsis: A person generally may not manufacture for distribution or sale a handgun manufactured after January 1, 1985 that is not included on the handgun roster in the State.; Manufacturers must ship handguns with a shell casing of a projectile discharged from the handgun in a sealed container.; A person many not manufacture a detachable magazine that has a capacity of more than 10 rounds of ammunition for a firearm.; .22 caliber rifles with tubular magazines that have a capacity of more than 10 rounds of ammunition may be manufactured.

Sale, purchase, and transfer
- Dealer regulations sections: Public Safety – § 5–106. Public Safety – § 5–118. Public Safety – § 5–134. Public Safety – § 5–128. Public Safety – § 5–131. Public Safety – § 5–132. Public Safety – § 5–204.
- Synopsis: A State license is required to engage in the business of selling, renting, or transferring regulated firearms.; Purchasers must complete a certified firearms safety training course before purchasing a regulated firearm.; An online program offered by the Maryland Police Training Commission can fill this requirement with the purchaser receiving the card at the end of the on-line lecture.; No more than one "regulated firearm" may be purchased in a 30-day period, except in certain circumstances.; Dealers must forward the manufacturer-included shell casing in its sealed container to the Department of State Police Crime Laboratory upon sale, rental, or transfer, for inclusion in their ballistics database, known as the Integrated Ballistics Identification System (IBIS).; Handguns manufactured on or before December 31, 2002 must be sold or transferred with an external safety lock.; Handguns manufactured after December 31, 2002 may only be sold or transferred if they have an internal mechanical safety device.; Maryland residents may purchase a rifle or shotgun from a Federally licensed dealer in Delaware, Pennsylvania, Virginia, or West Virginia.; Residents of Delaware, Pennsylvania, Virginia, or West Virginia may purchase a rifle or shotgun from a Federally licensed dealer in Maryland.
- Private sale regulations sections: Public Safety – § 5–106.
- Synopsis: Private sales of long guns are legal and do not require a dealer's license.; Private sales of "regulated firearms" are prohibited.
- Gun show regulations sections: Public Safety – § 5–130.
- Synopsis: A temporary transfer permit is required to offer a "regulated firearm" for sale at a gun show.

Transportation and carry
- Transportation restrictions sections: Criminal Law – § 4-201. Criminal Law – § 4-203. Criminal Law – §4-402. Criminal Law – §4-405.
- Synopsis: For the purposes of "Criminal Law – Subtitle 2. Handguns", including "§ 4–203. wearing, carrying, or transporting handgun,"; short-barreled rifles and short-barreled shotguns are "handguns."; certain antique firearms, as defined in Criminal Law – § 4-201, are not "handguns."; Machine guns generally may not be possessed outside of one's permanent residence or business occupancy.
- Open carry restrictions sections: Criminal Law – § 4-201. Public Safety – § 5–303. Public Safety – § 5–306. Criminal Law – § 4-203.
- Synopsis: Carrying a handgun either openly or concealed is prohibited, except certain persons, or in certain circumstances.; Exceptions include transportation of an unloaded and cased firearm, when traveling to or from: a place of purchase or repair; a residence and business; an organized military activity, formal or informal target practice, sport shooting event, or hunting.; Generally, no permit is required to possess a rifle or shotgun within the State.; The Secretary of State Police, at his discretion and based on an investigation, may issue a carry permit to a person seeking to wear, carry, or transport a handgun.

== State constitution ==
The Constitution of Maryland contains no provision protecting the right for individuals to keep and bear arms. The state preempts some local firearm regulations, though local governments may regulate firearms with respect to minors and areas of public assembly. Annapolis, Anne Arundel County, Montgomery County, Gaithersburg, and Baltimore are known to have local firearm regulations.

The Constitution of Maryland, Declaration of Rights, Art. 2. The Constitution of the United States, and the Laws made, or which shall be made, in pursuance thereof, and all Treaties made, or which shall be made, under the authority of the United States, are, and shall be the Supreme Law of the State; and the Judges of this State, and all the People of this State, are, and shall be bound thereby; anything in the Constitution or Law of this State to the contrary. Maryland state law currently blocks anyone who has been in a mental facility or has been reported or coded as mentally ill from buying a gun notwithstanding.

== Regulated firearms ==
The Maryland State Police maintain a registry of "regulated firearms" that are allowed to be sold within the state.

Residents may only purchase handguns manufactured after January 1, 1985, that are on the approved handguns list from the Maryland Handgun Roster.

== Integrated Ballistics Identification System ==
Until 2016, dealers were required to forward the manufacturer-included shell casing (or one provided by the federally licensed gun shop) in its sealed container to the Department of State Police Crime Laboratory upon sale, rental, or transfer of a "regulated firearm" for inclusion in their ballistics database, known as the Integrated Ballistics Identification System (IBIS). The program was shut down in 2015 due to its ineffectiveness.

== Laws prohibiting firearms ==
On April 4, 2013, the Maryland General Assembly approved legislation imposing significant new restrictions on gun ownership. The bills ban the sale of certain semi-automatic firearms that they define as assault weapons, limit magazine capacity to ten rounds, require that handgun purchasers be fingerprinted and pass a training class in order to obtain a handgun license, and bar persons who have been involuntarily committed to a mental health institution from possessing firearms. Martin O'Malley Governor at the time, signed the legislation into law on May 16, 2013. Regarding 10-round magazine limits for rifles purchased in Maryland, standard 30-round magazines may be purchased outside Maryland and brought into the state for personal use. Those standard magazines may not be transferred, given, sold or manufactured inside Maryland.

As of October 1, 2013, detachable magazines for semi-automatic handguns and semi-automatic centerfire rifles which are capable of holding more than 10 rounds may not be purchased, manufactured or sold, though they may be possessed (but not transferred within the state) by persons who already owned them prior to enactment of the 2013 changes. Magazines greater than ten rounds may be purchased or acquired outside the state and carried into Maryland and used within the state. Certain pistols are classified as "assault pistols", and banned from ownership if not registered prior to August 1, 1994. Only handguns on the official handgun roster may be sold in the state. Private sales of "regulated firearms," which includes handguns, are permissible, but must be done at a local Maryland State Police barracks. As of 1 Oct, a Handgun Qualification License (HQL) is required for the sale, as well as a background check and a mandatory seven-day waiting period. A person must obtain a safety training certificate prior to purchasing "regulated firearms" and present that certificate prior to each purchase. With some limited exceptions for designated firearms collectors, only one "regulated firearm" may be purchased in any 30-day period. Handguns manufactured on or before December 31, 2002, must be sold or transferred with an external safety lock. Handguns manufactured after December 31, 2002, may only be sold or transferred if they have an internal mechanical safety device.

Firearms advocates challenged the 2013 law. The District Court ruled that the law was constitutional based on intermediate scrutiny. On February 1, 2016, the United States Court of Appeals for the Fourth Circuit overruled the reasoning used to uphold the law in a 2-to-1 vote. The appellate court said that the ban on semi-automatic weapons and high-capacity magazines should be subject to strict scrutiny, not intermediate scrutiny, because they "are in common use by law-abiding citizens." The court acknowledged that the state has a right to limit the use of or ban citizen possession, sale, or transfer of "dangerous and unusual" weapons (such as hand grenades), but the weapons and ammunition barred by the 2013 law did not fall under that provision. The appellate court remanded the case to a federal district court, leaving the ban temporarily in place pending a review by the district court. The state said it would appeal the decision. On March 4, 2016, Fourth Circuit agreed to rehear the case en banc and oral arguments took place on May 11, 2016. The full court ruled that such assault weapons and magazines holding more than 10 rounds are not protected by the Second Amendment; the Supreme Court refused to hear the case.

Firearms are prohibited from certain places, including schools and demonstrations.

In 2022 Maryland governor Larry Hogan allowed legislation that will, according to The Washington Post, "ban the sale, receipt and transfer of unfinished frames or receivers that are not serialized by the manufacturer" to become law without his signature. This law will also ban the mere possession of such items starting in March 2023.

On November 21, 2023, a three-judge panel in the Fourth Circuit voted 2–1 to strike down the handgun licensing requirement as unconstitutional on 2A grounds.

== Open and concealed carry ==
Carrying a handgun, whether openly or concealed, is prohibited except in limited events such as hunting or, unless one has a permit to carry a handgun or is on their own property or their own place of business. The Maryland State Police shall issue a permit to carry a handgun once an individual meets the minimum permitting requirements. Following the NYSRPA v. Bruen Supreme Court ruling, no state can require an individual to show "Good Cause" nor can a State require a "Good and substantial reason" for an individual to obtain a permit to carry a handgun. Permits are not automatically renewed. Out of a total population of 6 million, there were 14,298 active carry permits as of April 2014. No permit is required to openly carry a rifle or shotgun in Maryland.

On August 5, 2019, Maryland State Police issued a new S.O.P. SOP 29-19-004 which rescinded the previous SOP 29–15–007. On March 5, 2012, a federal judge ruled in Woollard v Sheridan that Maryland's "may issue" concealed carry law is unconstitutional, writing, "A citizen may not be required to offer a 'good and substantial reason' why he should be permitted to exercise his rights." The Maryland Attorney General's office appealed the ruling. On March 21, 2013, a three judge panel of the Fourth Circuit Court of Appeals (U.S. Federal) unanimously overturned the District Court ruling, holding that the "good & substantial cause" requirements imposed by Maryland law are permissible without violating the 2nd Amendment.

On June 23, 2022, the United States Supreme Court ruled in New York State Rifle & Pistol Association, Inc. v.Bruen that New York's "may issue" concealed carry law is unconstitutional, writing, "New York’s proper-cause requirement violates the Fourteenth Amendment by preventing law-abiding citizens with ordinary self-defense needs from exercising their Second Amendment right to keep and bear arms in public". Although this does not specifically target the laws passed in Maryland, it upholds the March 5, 2012 decision in Woollard v Sheridan and opens the way for litigation that, based on this U.S. Supreme Court precedent, will likely prevail over objections from the State of Maryland.

Maryland police have been accused of targeting drivers from other states including Florida because they hold concealed-carry permits.

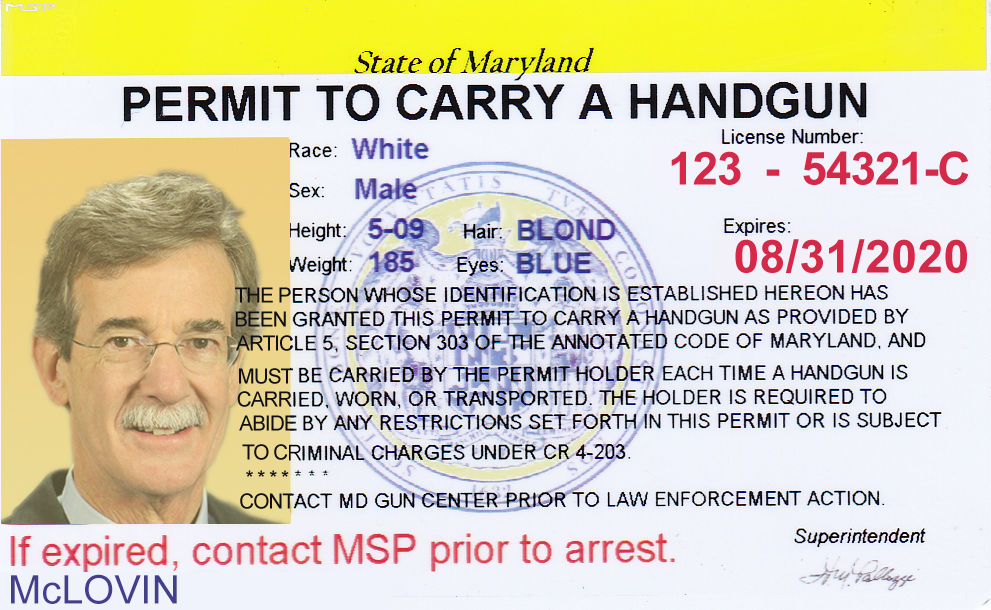
