= KITZ =

Radio station in state of Washington, U.S.

- Silverdale, Washington; United States
- Broadcast area: Puget Sound; Seattle–Tacoma
- Frequency: 1400 kHz
- Branding: Mega Talk 920 and 1400

Programming
- Format: Talk radio
- Network: Townhall Radio News
- Affiliations: Fox News Talk; Genesis Communications Network; Radio America; Salem Radio Network; USA Radio Network

Ownership
- Owner: Second Amendment Foundation (50%); Citizens Committee for the Right to Keep and Bear Arms (50%); (KITZ Radio, Inc.)
- Sister stations: KGTK

History
- First air date: October 15, 1952; 73 years ago (as KTNT in Tacoma, Washington)
- Last air date: January 2025; 1 year ago
- Former call signs: KTNT (1952-1983); KPMA (1983–1985)
- Call sign meaning: Station was in Kitsap County

Technical information
- Licensing authority: FCC
- Facility ID: 9737
- Class: C
- Power: 1,000 watts day; 890 watts night
- Transmitter coordinates: 47°37′44.3″N 122°39′56.5″W

Links
- Public license information: Public file; LMS
- Webcast: Listen live
- Website: www.kitz1400.com

KITZ (1400 AM "Megatalk 920 and 1400") was a commercial radio station featuring a talk radio format, simulcast with KGTK (920 AM) in Olympia. Licensed to Silverdale, Washington, KITZ served the Puget Sound Region, including Seattle and Tacoma. KITZ Radio, Inc. was owned by two gun-rights groups: the Second Amendment Foundation and its affiliate, the Citizens Committee for the Right to Keep and Bear Arms. Its main studio and production facilities were on Mile High Drive in Port Orchard.

By day, KITZ was powered at 1,000 watts, using a non-directional antenna. At night, there was a slight reduction of power to 890 watts. The transmitter was on Tibardis Road NW in Silverdale.

== Programming ==
KITZ and KGTK aired a mix of local and nationally syndicated conservative talk shows. Syndicated programs included The Dana Show with Dana Loesch, Brian Kilmeade and Friends, The Ramsey Show with Dave Ramsey, The Guy Benson Show and Good Day Live with Doug Stephan. Other programs, including Gun Talk with Tom Gresham, dealt with gun owners and their rights. Local programs included Outlaw Radio Network on Wednesday and Sunday nights.

== History ==
The station signed on the air on October 15, 1952. Its original call sign was KTNT and it was based in Tacoma. KTNT was owned by the Tacoma News Tribune; the newspaper also owned KTNT-TV (now KSTW) and KTNT-FM (now KIRO-FM). In 1983, the AM station became KPMA, which broadcast until 1985.

The station was relaunched in 1986 as KITZ, under the ownership of Silversound Broadcasting Company. Its city of license was transferred to Silverdale.

KITZ and KGTK suspended broadcasting operations in January 2025. The Federal Communications Commission cancelled KITZ’s license on July 28, 2025.
