= KBRD =

Simulcast with KUTI (680 AM)
- Olympia, Washington; United States
- Broadcast area: Puget Sound
- Frequency: 920 kHz
- Branding: K-Bird

Programming
- Format: Adult standards

Ownership
- Owner: BJ & Skip's For The Music Foundation
- Sister stations: KUTI

History
- First air date: October 1956
- Former call signs: KITN (1957–1982); KQEU (1982–1993); KCPL (1993–1996); KGHO (1996–1999); KAYO (1999); KGHO (1999–2004); KGTK (2004–2025)
- Call sign meaning: K-Bird (named after Skip's cockatoo B.J.)

Technical information
- Licensing authority: FCC
- Facility ID: 47567
- Class: D
- Power: 3,000 watts (day); 7 watts (night)
- Transmitter coordinates: 47°03′44″N 122°49′49″W

Links
- Public license information: Public file; LMS
- Webcast: Listen live
- Website: www.kbrd.org

KBRD (920 AM) is a radio station licensed to Olympia, Washington, United States, airing an adult standards format. It is owned by the BJ & Skip's For The Music Foundation alongside KUTI (680 AM), licensed to Lacey.

By day, KBRD is powered at 3,000 watts, using a non-directional antenna. At night, to prevent interference to other stations on 920 AM, KBRD's power is reduced to 7 watts. The transmitter is on Sleater Kinney Road NE in Olympia.

== History ==
=== KITN ===
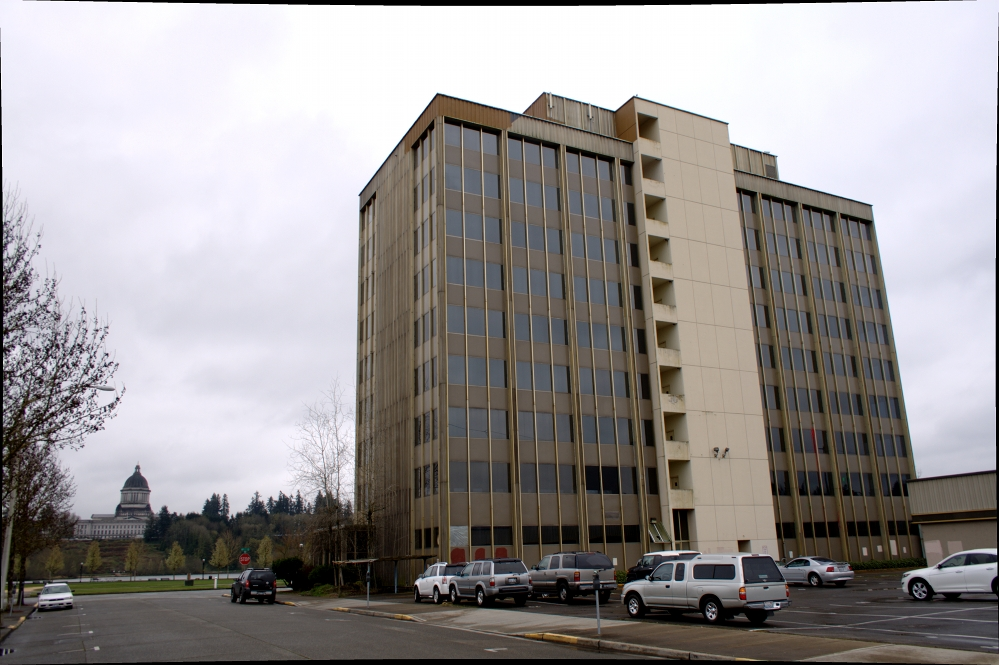
The Capitol Center Building housed KITN from 1967 to 1975

Donald F. Whitman filed an application with the Federal Communications Commission (FCC) on April 11, 1955, to build a new daytime-only radio station in Olympia. He originally sought 800 kHz before amending his application to specify the frequency of 1440 kHz. The construction permit was granted on January 25, 1956, and the station began broadcasting that October as KITN.

Until 1961, Harold C. Singleton, an engineer from Portland, Oregon, owned stakes in KITN and KITI, another station owned by Whitman in Centralia/Chehalis. KITN upgraded from 500 watts on 1440 kHz to 1,000 watts on 920 kHz, still a daytime-only station, in 1959. The original KITN studios were at 610 Columbia Street; in 1967, the station relocated to the Capitol Center Building.

In 1975, KITN moved its studios from the Capitol Center Building to Lacey. The move was necessitated by plans, which were quickly dropped, to reuse the building as a county courthouse; despite the changes, Thurston County taxpayers still paid more than $17,000 in moving expenses. A change in FCC policy emphasizing coverage of a number of stations for cities of a given size enabled KITN to go from a daytime-only to a full-time station in 1977, with a second tower erected to create a directional pattern protecting a station in Spokane.

=== National Communications ownership ===
In August 1981, after a quarter-century, Whitman sold KITN to Space Center, Inc., through its affiliate National Communications. The new owners took over that October, and on January 18, the KITN call letters departed Olympia. A day of silence preceded the relaunch of what was billed as a "new" station, KQEU "KQ-92"; KITN's easy listening music made way for a more upbeat adult contemporary format. The revamped KQEU gave KGY, which had been on the air since 1922, credible competition with a "big city" sound. AM stereo broadcasts were added in 1985.

The "KQ-92" moniker stayed until 1992, when the station rebranded as "The Capital" and beefed up its local and national news programming; the call sign was changed the next year to KCPL. However, a lawsuit lost by National forced the station to dismantle one of its two towers, causing its power to be reduced from 5,000 to 500 watts during the day and just 8.5 watts at night. The power reduction limited the station's broadcast range significantly, which became a liability when National's corporate parent, the SpaceCom Group, went on the market in 1993 with all six of its radio stations. With no buyers, National took the station silent on August 31, 1995.

=== Spencer Broadcasting and Second Amendment Foundation ownership ===
Despite closing KCPL for lack of a buyer, National found one months later. In January 1996, it reached an agreement to sell the silent KCPL to Spencer Broadcasting for just $35,000. It returned to the air later that year with an oldies format and the call sign KGHO. Both were ditched for several months in April 1999 when the station was leased by KAYO-FM 99.3, a country music station in Aberdeen, and began simulcasting it.

The Second Amendment Foundation, headed by Alan Gottlieb and owner of KITZ in Silverdale, acquired KGHO in 2004 from Spencer and changed the format to talk radio as KGTK, with some programs being shared with KITZ.

=== KBRD ===
In 2025, the facilities of KGTK were donated to the BJ and Skip's For the Music Foundation, owners of KBRD (680 AM). The station at the time was silent. The KBRD call sign was moved to 920 on July 1, 2025, with 680 changing to KUTI.
