= Ezequiel Cacace =

Argentine footballer

Personal information
- Full name: Ezequiel Damián Cacace
- Date of birth: 7 January 1984 (age 42)
- Place of birth: Buenos Aires, Argentina
- Height: 1.82 m (6 ft 0 in)
- Position: Goalkeeper

Senior career*
Years	Team	Apps	(Gls)
2004–2007	Talleres RE	61	(0)
2007–2012	Vélez Sársfield	0	(0)
2011	→ Rangers (loan)	39	(0)
2012–2013	Atlético Tucumán	9	(0)
2013–2014	Almirante Brown	25	(0)
2014–2016	Rangers	68	(0)
2016–2017	Cobreloa	43	(0)
2017–2018	Regatas de Avellaneda	17	(2)
2018–2021	Talleres RE	95	(0)
2022	Cañuelas	9	(0)
2022	El Porvenir	11	(0)
2022–2023	Colón Chivilcoy	8	(0)
Total		385	(2)
- * Club domestic league appearances and goals

Ezequiel Damián Cacace (born January 7, 1984) is an Argentine former football goalkeeper.

== Career ==
Besides Argentina, Cacace played in Chile for Rangers and Cobreloa.
