= KBNP =

Currently silent
- Portland, Oregon; United States
- Broadcast area: Portland metropolitan area
- Frequency: 1410 kHz

Ownership
- Owner: Second Amendment Foundation (50 percent); Citizens Committee for the Right to Keep and Bear Arms (50 percent); (KBNP Radio, Inc.)

History
- First air date: September 20, 1951
- Former call signs: KPAM (1951–1973); KLSC (1973–1976); KPAM (1976–1982); KCNR (1982–1986); KKUL (1986–1988)
- Call sign meaning: Business News Portland (former format)

Technical information
- Licensing authority: FCC
- Facility ID: 33670
- Class: D
- Power: 5,000 watts (day); 9 watts (night)
- Transmitter coordinates: 45°28′23.4″N 122°39′40.3″W

Links
- Public license information: Public file; LMS

KBNP (1410 AM, "The Money Station") was a commercial radio station licensed to Portland, Oregon, United States, that is currently silent. The station is licensed to KBNP Radio, Inc., and is jointly owned by the Second Amendment Foundation and Citizens Committee for the Right to Keep and Bear Arms, with radio studios on S.W. 84th Street Tualatin Oregon. KBNP's transmitter is located off of S.E. Oaks Parks Way near the Willamette River.

Prior to ceasing operations on September 26, 2025, KBNP featured a format of financial news and syndicated conservative talk shows.

== History ==
On September 20, 1951, the station first signed on the air as KPAM. From 1960 to 1970, there was also a KPFM on 97.1 MHz. On February 27, 1970, KPFM changed its call sign to KPAM-FM. KPAM-AM-FM ran a Top 40 format as "K-Pam." In 1980, Duffy Broadcasting acquired KPAM-AM-FM. In September of that year, KPAM-AM-FM changed to KCNR and KCNR-FM, as the "Center" of the FM dial. The two stations aired an adult contemporary format. From 1986-1988 the station had the callsign KKUL. (The callsign KPAM is still in the Portland market on 860 AM.)

The station was purchased by Alan Gottlieb of Bellevue Washington in 1988, and format was converted by Business, Financial/Investment and Lifestyle programming.

In March 2009, Alan M. Gottlieb applied to transfer control of KBNP Radio, Inc., the licensee of record for this radio station, to the Second Amendment Foundation and the Citizens Committee for the Right to Keep and Bear Arms, both of Bellevue, Washington. The transfer was approved by the FCC on March 27, 2009.
