= Gary Mauser =

- Education: University of California, Berkeley, University of California, Irvine
- Spouse: Edelina Mauser-Wong
- Children: 3
- Scientific career
- Fields: Criminology, Marketing
- Workplaces: Simon Fraser University
- Thesis: A structural approach to predicting patterns of electoral substitution: a study of the 1968 presidential contest in California (1970)
- Website: www.garymauser.net

Gary A. Mauser is a Canadian criminologist and emeritus professor in the Beedie School of Business at Simon Fraser University.

== Education ==
Mauser received his B.A. from the University of California, Berkeley in 1964 and his Ph.D. from the University of California, Irvine in 1970, both in psychology.

== Career ==
Mauser joined the faculty of Simon Fraser University in 1975 as an assistant professor, and became an emeritus professor there in 2007. While on the faculty at Simon Fraser University, Mauser originally researched political marketing, but became a hunter after being introduced to shooting from his academic work. He has lectured extensively on the criminal use of guns. For service to the community, he was awarded the Queen Elizabeth II Diamond Jubilee Medal in 2012.

== Views ==
Mauser has been described as a gun rights advocate. He has said that "No methodologically sound study has found any important effect on homicide, suicide or violent crime rates from Canadian gun laws." In a 2007 article co-authored with Don Kates, Mauser argued that claims that guns kept in the home will probably be used to shoot a spouse "appear to rest on no evidence and actually contradict facts that have so uniformly been established by homicide studies dating back to the 1890s that they have become 'criminological axioms.'"
