= Wise use movement =

American political coalition of right-libertarian and anti-statist environmentalists

The wise use movement in the United States is a coalition of groups promoting the expansion of private property rights and reduction of government regulation of publicly held property. This includes advocacy of expanded use by commercial and public interests, seeking increased access to public lands, and often opposition to government intervention. Wise use proponents describe human use of the environment as "stewardship of the land, the water and the air" for the benefit of human beings. The wise use movement arose from opposition to the mainstream environmental movement, claiming it to be radical.

== Background to the movement ==
A range of groups belong to the wise use movement, including industry, grassroots organizations of loggers, mill workers, ranchers, farmers, miners, off-road vehicle users, and property owners. It also includes libertarians, populists, and religious and political conservatives. The movement became known as "wise use" after the 1988 Multiple Use Strategy Conference in Reno, Nevada. The movement includes or is supported by multiple anti-environmentalist groups, by companies in the resource extraction industry, by land development companies, and by libertarian and minarchist organizations. The movement was most active in the Western United States in the late 1980s and 1990s.

=== Major organizations ===
According to James McCarthy (2002), the most prominent wise use groups receive most of their support from resource extraction industries (Amoco, British Petroleum, Chevron, Exxon/Mobile, Marathon Oil) as well as the American Farm Bureau, Dupont, Yamaha, General Electric, General Motors, National Cattlemen's Association, and the National Rifle Association. The policies and political orientations of groups in the wise use movement range from some who self-identify as free-market environmentalists, to industry-backed public relations groups and mainstream think tanks, to some militia groups and fundamentalist religious groups. Major organizations promoting wise use ideas include Alliance for America, the American Land Rights Association, the Cato Institute, the Center for the Defense of Free Enterprise, People for the West, the Blue Ribbon Coalition, and the Heartland Institute.

Most members of the wise use movement, including the related County Movement, share a belief in individual rights, as opposed to the authority of the federal government, in particular with regard to the rights of land use. They argue that the environmental movement is both anti-private property and anti-people. While some in the wise use movement have strongly anti-environmental views, others assert that the free market, rather than government regulation, will better protect the environment.

==== Wise use agenda ====
Many wise use groups argue that rural residents suffer a disproportionate impact from environmental regulations, and that the environmental movement is biased toward the attitudes of urban elites, ignoring the rural perspective. Opponents observe that the extractive forces behind the wise use movement harm rural residents more and prey on the independence of rural residents - preaching the "right to ride" when behind that is the desire to strip mine and clearcut using unsustainable methods. Some environmentalists disagree with the Sierra Club's "no-cut forest" policy. Steve Thompson wrote the goal of the policy should be to "provide greater flexibility to achieve true forest restoration. A blanket, one-size-fits-all 'zero cut' policy severely restricts the Sierra Club's ability to provide solutions to complex forest mismanagement problems."

==== Wise use strategies ====
Wise use groups depict themselves as (and seek to promote themselves as) true environmentalists with close ties to the land, and cast environmental groups as advocating radical environmentalism. Wise use groups also downplay threats to the environment, and highlight uncertainties in environmental science that they argue environmental groups ignore or conceal. Wise use groups also portray the environmentalist movement as having a hidden agenda to control land.

== Ron Arnold and wise use ==
The Wise Use movement first gained prominence in 1988 when Ron Arnold, a vice-president of the Center for the Defense of Free Enterprise, helped an organize conference that led to adoption of a 25-point "Wise Use Agenda". This agenda included initiatives seeking unrestricted commercial use of public lands for timber, mining, and oil, and to open recreational wilderness areas for easier access by the general public. Critics point out that Ron Arnold has been quoted as saying his goal is to "destroy the environmental movement".

According to Arnold, many in the wise use movement believe the possibility of unlimited economic growth, in which environmental and social problems can be mitigated by market economy and the use of technology. In his book Ecology Wars, which has been called the "Bible" of the wise use movement, Arnold writes: "Environmentalism is an institutionalized movement of certain people with a certain ideology about man and nature" and that "the goal of our ecology wars should be to defeat environmentalism." Arnold claims that environmentalism is "the excess baggage of anti-technology, of anti-civilization, of anti-humanity, and of institutionalized lust for political power."

=== Access to public lands ===
In the 1980s and 1990s, the management focus on public lands shifted from the harvest of timber to ecological goals such as improvement of habitat, largely as a response to the environmental movement. The resultant reduction in timber harvest contributed to the closure of sawmills and the layoff of loggers and other workers. Some members of the wise use movement objected to what they saw as a shifting of control of federal land resources from local to outside, urban interests. They argued that the National Forests were established for the benefit of the local community. They cite Gifford Pinchot, who wrote "It is the duty of the Forest Service to see to it that the timber, water-powers, mines, and every other resource of the forests is used for the benefit of the people who live in the neighborhood or who may have a share in the welfare of each locality." Wise use members have also argued that continued access to public lands is necessary to maintain the health, culture and traditions of local communities.

Jill M. Belsky, a professor of Rural & Environmental Sociology at the University of Montana, wrote:

"there is a pattern for rural peoples and communities to be viewed as destroyers of nature in the United States, given their reliance on extractive industries such as mining, logging, grazing and commercial, petrochemical based-farming; and they provided political action in support of these industries. Given this history, it is not surprising that there has been a reluctance on the part of conservationists to envision how rural peoples and rural livelihoods could have played any significant role in the formation of wildlands or in any potential role they could play in the restoration and protection of large wildlands in the future. In the United States policy emphasizes ecosystems and ecosystem management. But while I understand this logic, I think it underestimates the importance of rural places, peoples and livelihoods in the management of large wildlands."

== Criticism ==
Academics Ralph Maughan and Douglas Nilsona write that wise use is a "desperate effort to defend the hegemony of the cultural and economic values of the agricultural and extractive industries of the rural West", and have "argued that the Wise Use agenda stemmed from an ideology that combined laissez-faire capitalism with cultural characteristics of an imagined Old West".

Some critics of the wise use movement claim that the strong rhetoric used has deepened divisions between opposing interest groups, and has indirectly increased violence and threats of violence against environmental groups and public employees. "Many observers noted that Wise Use activity in some areas overlapped heavily with the 1990s formation and growth of militias, self-styled volunteer paramilitary organizations presciently committed to their own version of homeland security."

Environmental historian Richard White has criticized Wise Use for upholding the rights of large landowners at the expense of working rural people in his essay, "'Are You an Environmentalist or Do You Work for a Living?': Work and Nature."

Broadcast journalist Stephenie Hendricks claimed in her book Divine Destruction that wise use is in part "being driven by biblical fundamentalists who believe exhausting natural resources will hasten the Second Coming of Jesus Christ."

=== Grassroots or front groups ===
Environmental activists have argued that the wise use movement is orchestrated largely or entirely by industry. David Helvarg's book The War Against the Greens contends that the wise use movement is not a collection of grassroots uprisings, but a set of astroturfing movements created by big business. Carl Deal, author of The Greenpeace Guide to Anti-Environmental Organizations also makes the same claim: that wise use groups give the appearance of being popular grassroots movements, but are actually front organizations for industry groups with a financial interest in the movement's agenda. Robert F. Kennedy, Jr. also described this conspiracy against the environment by wise use organizations in his 2004 book Crimes Against Nature.

== History ==
The term wise use was coined in 1910 by U.S. Forest Service leader Gifford Pinchot to describe his concept of sustainable harvest of natural resources.

Today's wise use coalition has appropriated a nineteenth-century term. According to historian Douglas McCleery, the idea of "conservation as wise use" of natural resources began with conservation leader Gifford Pinchot in the late nineteenth century. The original "wise use" movement was a product of the Progressive Era, and included the concept of multiple use—public land can be used simultaneously for recreation, for timber, for mining, and for wildlife habitat. The multiple-use and wise use concepts advocated by Pinchot reflected the view that nature's resources should be scientifically managed so as "to protect the basic productivity of the land and its ability to serve future generations."

The modern use of the term "wise use" to refer to opposition to the environmental movement dates to the publication of Ron Arnold's book Wise Use Agenda in 1989. The wise use movement has its roots in both the earlier "Sagebrush Rebellion" in the western United States during the late 1970s and to the earlier opposition to the formation of the national forests.

However, unlike the Sagebrush Rebellion, which consisted largely of the formation of industry public relations groups by resource extraction industries and corporations such as Coors and Co, wise use included grassroots groups. Ron Arnold argued that the inclusion of citizen groups would make the movement more effective. In 1979, in Logging Management magazine, Arnold wrote: "Citizen activist groups, allied to the forest industry, are vital to our future survival. They can speak for us in the public interest where we ourselves cannot. They are not limited by liability, contract law or ethical codes... industry must come to support citizen activist groups, providing funds, materials, transportation, and most of all, hard facts."

James McCarthy wrote:

The Wise Use movement is a broad coalition of over a thousand national, state, and local groups. Its existence by this name dates from a 1988 'Multiple-Use Strategy Conference' attended by nearly 200 organizations, mainly Western-based, including natural resource industry corporations and trade associations, law firms specializing in combating environmental regulations, and recreational groups. The conference produced a legislative agenda intended to 'destroy environmentalism' and promote the 'wise use' of natural resources - an intentionally ambiguous phrase strategically appropriated from the early conservation movement.

== See also ==
- Cornwall Alliance – Evangelical anti-environmental front group
