= American Land Rights Association =

American Wise Use organization

- Abbreviation: ALRA
- Formation: 1978
- Founder: Property owners in Wawona, California
- Type: Wise Use organization
- Headquarters: Battle Ground, Washington, U.S.
- Formerly called: National Park Inholders Association (1978–1980); National Inholders Association (1980–1995)

The American Land Rights Association (ALRA) is a Wise Use organization based in Battle Ground, Washington. The group describes itself as "dedicated to the wise-use of our resources, access to our Federal lands and the protection of our private property rights."

== History ==
The organization was founded in 1978 by property owners in the community of Wawona, California, located within Yosemite National Park. It was initially named the National Park Inholders Association; it describes its mission at that time as "to protect private property landowners from unwanted acquisition by the National Park Service".

The National Park Inholders Association changed its name to the National Inholders Association (NIA) in 1980. In 1985, it added a number of grazing permittees on federal land to its membership roll. In the early 1990s, it advocated the cause of mining claimholders. In 1995, the organization was renamed as the American Land Rights Association (ALRA).

A case of an appointee, that was for environmental preservation, was John Turner, a friend of vice-president Dick Cheney, who was under consideration for the #2 position in the Department of the Interior. ALRA and other property-rights organizations opposed Turner's appointment because of his position as president of the Conservation Fund, which an ALRA release asserted was "dedicated to threatening, dividing and isolating land owners and small towns". President George W. Bush chose not to appoint Turner, instead selecting mining-industry lobbyist J. Steven Griles. President George W. Bush however, nominated Turner for Assistant Secretary of State for Oceans and International Environmental and Scientific Affairs, who was then appointed and held the position in office until July 2005.

== Activism ==
The ALRA cooperates with broad-based conservative organizations on land-use related issues. It is associated with the Land Rights Network, a lobby outreach network that utilizes mail, phone, fax and e-mail. It also organizes the League of Private Property Voters, which has published a vote index since 1990, scoring members of Congress on votes relating to regulations on private property rights and restrictions on use of federal public lands. The League promotes some general conservative causes unrelated to land use: for example, their 2007 ratings of U.S. Senate members were based on ten votes, one of which was a measure to prevent restoration of the Fairness Doctrine on radio and television. The ALRA has also sent representatives to testify before various governing bodies. The ALRA has questioned the actions of the National Park Service and the Bureau of Land Management as they continue expanding national parks and public lands.

=== Pilgrim Family ===
The American Land Rights Association has done coverage in Wrangell, Alaska, between the Pilgrim family and the NPS, over a bulldozing incident in the Wrangell-St. Elias National Park and Preserve. Some coverage was done on this event by the ALRA on their newsletter here, which was part of a much bigger inquiry on what the National Park Service was doing in Alaska. The ALRA supported the Pilgrim family's use of the Revised Statute 2477, a written law enacted by the United States Congress, to state that the path bulldozed in the Wrangell-St. Elias National Park and Preserve was private land owned by the Pilgrim family. A map showcasing the trails in Alaska that are documented by the Revised Statute 2477, as of August 13, 2013, can be seen on this here. The Revised Statute 2477 was however, repealed by the Federal Land Policy and Management Act of 1976. This repeal however, did not "terminate right-of-way conveyed under R.S. 2477" allowing the Pilgrim family to utilize the Revised Statute 2477 as a support to their case. The Bureau of Land Management has also stated the Revised Statute 2477 as a "complex and controversial issue with far-reaching implications to the management of federal lands throughout the West."

=== Hammond Family ===
The American Land Rights Association has also done coverage on the issue between the Hammond family and the Bureau of Land Management in Oregon. The ALRA believe that the Bureau of Land Management and the National Park Service are presenting an "abuse of power" towards the Hammond family being sentenced to five years. The ALRA also believe that "peaceful protest is always the way to go" and that sending the Hammond family for an additional time in jail is a "great injustice." The ALRA redistributed this news of what was happening to the Hammond family, and making a request of unification from western communities, through use of the Land Rights Network. The ALRA had reported that the Hammond family set a "minor fire that cost less than $100" and burned "127 acres of land." The ALRA had also reported what prosecutors stated on the arson charges with "the fires were set to reduce the growth of juniper trees and sagebrush" and to "accelerate the growth of rangeland grasses for the Hammond's' cattle." The United States Department of Justice however, have documented the burning of land by the Hammond family as affecting "139 acres of public land" to "destroy all evidence of game violations." The United States Department of Justice had also documented that "Witnesses at trial, including a relative of the Hammonds, testified the arson occurred shortly after Steven Hammond and his hunting party illegally slaughtered several deer on BLM property." The ALRA believe that the Bureau of Land Management and the Fish and Wildlife Service had sentenced the Hammond family to "gain ownership of the Hammond ranch which is intermingled with Federal ground in the Malheur National Wildlife Refuge" and to "inflict as much pain as possible on the Hammonds to reduce the chances other ranchers will stand up for their rights." The ALRA had also reported on the interference of Ammon Bundy during the Hammond family incident with the Bureau of Land Management. The Occupation of the Malheur National Wildlife Refuge, led by Ammon Bundy, was commented on by Len Vohs, the mayor of Burns from 2008 to 2010, stating "many locals and himself, share the frustration with the federal government that drove Bundy and others to occupy the wildlife refuge" and continued on saying "few support their tactics, and wish they would just go home." Len Vohs had also stated "the occupiers, few if any of whom are from the Burns, do not speak for the town" in regards to Ammon Bundy's group, who had also attended the rally for the Hammonds.
