= Susan Cacace =

American attorney

District Attorney of Westchester County
- In office January 27, 2025 – Present
- Preceded by: Mimi Rocah

Judge of the Court of Westchester County, New York
- In office January 1, 2006 – December 31, 2023
- Preceded by: Lester B Adler
- Succeeded by: Ann B. Bianchi

Personal details
- Born: April 16, 1964 (age 62) Yonkers, New York
- Party: Democratic
- Other political affiliations: Republican; Conservative; Independence; Reform
- Spouse: James G. Dibbini
- Education: Pace University (BA); Elisabeth Haub School of Law (JD)
- Profession: Attorney, judge, politician

Susan Marie Cacace is an American politician currently serving as District Attorney for Westchester County, New York. Cacace was elected as Westchester County's 36th district attorney in 2024. Before assuming the county's top prosecutor role, she served as a Westchester County trial judge.

== Education and early career ==
Cacace was born on April 16, 1964, to Patricia McCann and Robert W. Cacace. Her father had served as a Justice of the Peace from 1957 to 1961 and a City Judge in Yonkers, New York from 1968 until his death in 1986.

Cacace obtained a bachelor's degree in English from Pace University in 1986, before also earning a juris doctor from the Elisabeth Haub School of Law, which was then-called Pace Law School, three years later.

After graduating law school, Cacace worked as an assistant district attorney in Westchester County for about fifteen years. During her tenure as a prosecutor, she led the county's first dedicated animal cruelty unit.

== Judicial and political career ==
Cacace first ran for public office in 2002, seeking a position as a justice on New York State Supreme Court in the judicial 9th district. However, she failed to secure seat on the court. She later joined her husband as a partner at the law firm Cacace & Dibbini.

In 2005, Cacace won an election as a Westchester County Court Judge, beating Republican Party candidate Charles Devlin. In 2008, she was also designated as an Acting Justice of the Supreme Court by Chief Administrative Judge Ann T. Pfau. While serving her first term as a Westchester County judge, Cacace acted as the county's handgun licensing officer, a role that made her the named defendant in Kachalsky v. Cacace (2010), a federal Second Amendment challenge to New York's 'proper cause' requirement for concealed carry permits. The case was affirmed by the Second Circuit as Kachalsky v. County of Westchester, 701 F.3d 81 (2d Cir. 2012), before being effectively superseded by New York State Rifle & Pistol Association v. Bruen (2022). She was later re-elected in 2015, running simultaneously with the Democratic, Republican, Conservative, Independence, and Reform party lines, under New York's fusion electoral system. Cacace led the county's sex crimes court for nearly fourteen years.

In 2023, Cacace retired from the Westchester County Court to run for Westchester County District Attorney after incumbent Mimi Rocah announced she would not seek re-election. After winning the Democratic Party nomination, Cacace beat Republican candidate John Sarcone in November 2024.

== Personal life ==
Cacace lives in Bronxville, New York with her husband and former law partner James G. Dibbini. They have three daughters.

In addition to her elected position, she is also a member of the Yonkers Lawyers Association, the Columbian Lawyers Association, the Westchester County Bar Association and the New York State Bar Association.

== Electoral history ==
2002 New York Supreme Court Election, 9th Judicial District
Party	Candidate	Votes	%
Republican	Janet DiFiore	216,620	
Independence	Janet DiFiore	20,512	
Conservative	Janet DiFiore	22,443	
Total	Janet DiFiore	259,575	
Republican	Linda S. Jamieson	197,729	
Independence	Linda S. Jamieson	16,240	
Conservative	Linda S. Jamieson	21,049	
Total	Linda S. Jamieson	235,018	
Republican	Thomas A. Dickerson	196,084	
Conservative	Thomas A. Dickerson	21,529	
Right to Life	Thomas A. Dickerson	14,842	
Total	Thomas A. Dickerson	232,455	
Republican	Mary H. Smith	193,427	
Conservative	Mary H. Smith	21,448	
Right to Life	Mary H. Smith	14,948	
Working Families	Mary H. Smith	5,607	
Total	Mary H. Smith	235,430	
Republican	James V. Brands	190,280	
Conservative	James V. Brands	20,533	
Right to Life	James V. Brands	14,423	
Total	James V. Brands	225,236	
Democratic	Jeffrey Cohen	193,085	
Independence	Jeffrey Cohen	17,182	
Working Families	Jeffrey Cohen	6,766	
Total	Jeffrey Cohen	217,033	
Democratic	Bruce E. Tolbert	186,963	
Independence	Bruce E. Tolbert	16,381	
Working Families	Bruce E. Tolbert	6,647	
Total	Bruce E. Tolbert	209,991	
Democratic	Marc J. Lust	183,716	
Independence	Marc J. Lust	16,381	
Total	Marc J. Lust	200,097	
Democratic	Gerald E. Loehr	174,427	
Democratic	Susan Cacace-Dibbini	174,972	
Right to Life	Mary N. Clark	13,377	
Right to Life	Robert D. Brady	13,539	
Working Families	Elizabeth B. Emmons	6,199	
Total votes		2,695,425	100.00
Republican hold			

2005 Westchester County Court Judge General election
Party	Candidate	Votes	%
Democratic	Susan Cacace	94,110	53.78
Independence	Susan Cacace	7,107	4.06
Total	Susan Cacace	101,217	57.84
Republican	Charles F. Devlin	59,831	34.19
Conservative	Charles F. Devlin	7,649	4.37
Working Families	Charles F. Devlin	2,497	1.43
Total	Charles F. Devlin	69,977	39.99
Right to Life	Raymond W. Belair	3,785	2.16
Write-in		4	0.00
Total votes		174,983	100.00
Democratic hold			

2015 Westchester County Court Judge General election
Party	Candidate	Votes	%
Democratic	Susan Cacace	58,538	57.34
Republican	Susan Cacace	31,704	31.06
Conservative	Susan Cacace	7,166	7.02
Independence	Susan Cacace	3,584	3.51
Reform	Susan Cacace	650	0.64
Total	Susan Cacace	101,642	99.56
Write-in		446	0.44
Total votes		102,088	100.00
Democratic hold			

2024 Westchester County District Attorney Election
Primary election
Party	Candidate	Votes	%
Democratic	Susan Cacace	45,661	60.42
Democratic	William O. Wagstaff III	22,762	30.12
Democratic	Adeel Mirza	7,153	9.46
Total votes		75,576	100.00
General election
Democratic	Susan Cacace	269,249	63.89
Republican	John A. Sarcone III	151,914	36.05
Write-in	William Wagstaff	65	0.02
Write-in		169	0.04
Total votes		421,397	100.00
Democratic hold			
