= Kachalsky v. County of Westchester =

Court case interpreting the Second Amendment to the U.S. Constitution

- Court: United States Court of Appeals for the Second Circuit
- Argued: August 22, 2012
- Decided: November 27, 2012
- Citation: 701 F.3d 81

Case history
- Prior history: Defendants' motion for summary judgment granted. Kachalsky v. Cacace, 10-cv-5413 (S.D.N.Y. 2011).
- Subsequent history: Cert. denied. Kachalsky v. Cacace, 569 U.S. 918 (2013).

Holding
- New York’s “proper cause” requirement for a concealed-carry license did not violate the Second Amendment because the burden on the right was justified under intermediate scrutiny.

Court membership
- Judges sitting: Katzmann, Wesley, Lynch

Case opinions
- Majority: Wesley, joined by Katzmann, Lynch

Laws applied
- U.S. Const. amend. II
- Abrogated by
- New York State Rifle & Pistol Association, Inc. v. Bruen

Kachalsky v. County of Westchester, 701 F.3d 81 (2d Cir. 2012) was a Second Circuit case regarding the constitutionality of New York's "may-issue" public carry laws.

== Background ==
Chapter 265 of the Penal Code of the State of New York deals primarily with crimes involving illegal possession of firearms. §265.01(1) generally prohibits the possession of firearms by individuals, making it a gross misdemeanor, while §265.03(3) makes possession of a firearm outside of one's home or place of business a felony. However, these do not apply, as in 265.20, to an individual who possesses a license issued by the State of New York under Chapter 400 of the Penal Code. The only license available to most residents of the State is provided under §400.00(2), which is a license "to have and carry concealed, without regard to employment or place of possession, [a pistol or revolver] by any person when proper cause exists for the issuance thereof." Self-Defense is described as a "central component" of the 2nd Amendment, see, McDonald vs. City of Chicago (2010), and New York is ignoring this as "proper cause" to deny this right to keep and bear arms for self-defense. This "proper cause" clause is understood to allow the issuing authority discretion to deny permits based on lack of demonstration by the applicant of such cause.

Alan Kachalsky applied for such a carry license in 2008, and was denied by Cacace on the recommendation of the County Judge in October, based solely on the fact that he "has not stated any facts which would demonstrate a need for self protection distinguishable from that of the general public." (The county judge who made this recommendation is not named specifically in the suit; this is common as lawsuits claiming damages resulting from judicial orders have a very high burden of proof to prevent retaliatory litigation). He appealed to the Appellate Division of the New York State Supreme Court, which in September 2009 held that the Defendants' decision was not "arbitrary or capricious" and would stand. The New York State Court of Appeals dismissed a further appeal in February 2010 on the grounds that it presented no constitutional question. At the time, the Second Circuit Court of Appeals had held that the decisions made in District of Columbia v. Heller did not apply to the States as the Second Amendment had not been incorporated to the States. However, in June 2010, the Supreme Court's decision in McDonald overturned this decision and held that the Second Amendment did constitute a limitation on States' powers.

Plaintiff Christina Nikolov similarly applied for a handgun carry license in the same County in 2009, and was denied for similar reasons, including a similar finding that Nikolov "has not demonstrated that she has a special need for self-protection distinguishable from that of the general public".

== District Court ==
The federal complaint, dated July 14, 2010, was filed in the United States District Court for the Southern District of New York, White Plains Division, Judge Cathy Siebel presiding. It asserts that New York's "proper cause" requirement constitutes an unreasonable infringement upon the Second Amendment rights of the Plaintiffs and of all residents of the State of New York, subject to liability under 42 USC §1983. It requests an order enjoining the Defendants and their officers and agents from enforcing the good cause requirement of NYPC §400.00(2)(f), an order commanding Defendants to issue the Plaintiffs their applied-for permits, and other relief.

The Defendants filed a motion to dismiss, which was denied, and a hearing for the Plaintiffs' motion for summary judgement was subsequently granted. Both sides filed numerous briefs in support or opposition to this motion, and on September 2, 2011, District Judge Cathy Siebel denied the Plaintiffs' motion, simultaneously granting the Defendants' cross-motion for summary judgement in their favor. Judge Siebel found that, in applying intermediate scrutiny, the "proper cause" requirement promotes and is substantially related to the government's strong interest in public safety and crime prevention, and thus, while it is conceded to be an infringement of the Plaintiffs' Constitutional rights, it is constitutional and may stand.

== Court of appeals ==
The Plaintiffs' filed notice of an appeal to the United States Court of Appeals, Second Circuit, on September 7, 2011. Oral arguments were heard on August 22, 2012, and on November 27 of the same year, the panel ruling affirmed the District Court decision along similar reasoning. The Court noted that restrictions on firearms in New York law predate the ratification of the Constitution, and the law in nearly its current form has survived constitutional scrutiny before (albeit under the now-erroneous assertion that the Second Amendment of the Constitution is solely a check on Federal powers and does not apply to the States). The court assumed, without deciding, that the Second Amendment does entail a right to bear arms in public, but it held that the "proper cause" requirement passes muster under intermediate scrutiny.

== Supreme Court ==
The Appellants' (Kachalsky et alii) petition for certiorari was filed on January 8, 2013. The questions presented were:

1. Does the Second Amendment secure a right to carry handguns for self-defense outside the home?
2. Do state officials violate the Second Amendment by denying handgun carry licenses to responsible, law-abiding adults for lack of "proper cause" to bear arms for self-defense?

Certiorari was denied April 15, 2013, however it was widely expected that the Supreme Court would eventually hear a case on the issue, as the Circuit Courts were divided in their opinions on public handgun carry permit policies. Woollard v. Sheridan, initially decided in favor of a plaintiff seeking to renew a Maryland concealed carry permit, was overturned on appeal by the Fourth Circuit along reasoning similar to the Second Circuit's here, while Moore v. Madigan, a case challenging Illinois' no-issue permitting policy, was decided in favor of the Plaintiffs and subsequently upheld by the Seventh Circuit.

== Subsequent developments ==
Nearly a decade later, the Supreme Court revisited the same question in New York State Rifle & Pistol Association, Inc. v. Bruen (2022). In Bruen, the Court struck down New York’s "proper cause" requirement, holding that the Second Amendment protects the right of ordinary citizens to carry firearms in public for self-defense. This ruling effectively overruled the reasoning of Kachalsky and similar appellate decisions, resolving the prior circuit split.
