= Gun laws in Kentucky =

Location of Kentucky in the United States

Gun laws in Kentucky regulate the sale, possession, and use of firearms and ammunition in the Commonwealth of Kentucky in the United States.

== Summary table ==
Subject / law	Long guns	Handguns	Relevant statutes	Notes
State permit required to purchase?	No	No		
Firearm registration?	No	No		
Assault weapon law?	No	No		
Magazine capacity restriction?	No	No		
Owner license required?	No	No		
Permit required for concealed carry?	N/A	No	KRS § 237.109; KRS § 237.110	Kentucky is a "shall issue" state for citizens and lawful permanent residents who are 21 years or older. Permitless carry took effect on June 26, 2019.
Permit required for open carry?	No	No		May carry openly without permit.
Castle Doctrine/Stand Your Ground law?	Yes	Yes	KRS § 503.050	
State preemption of local restrictions?	Yes	Yes	KRS § 65.870; KRS § 237.115	No locality "may occupy any part of the field of regulation of the manufacture, sale, purchase, taxation, transfer, ownership, possession, carrying, storage, or transportation of firearms, ammunition, components of firearms, components of ammunition, firearms accessories, or combination thereof." The following entities can restrict concealed carry, per law: Postsecondary educational institutions; Any unit of government within the state in buildings that it owns, leases, or occupies – however, concealed carry is allowed in highway rest areas, public housing, and private dwellings
NFA weapons restricted?	No	No		
Shall certify?	Yes	Yes	KRS § 237.075	Shall certify within 15 days.
Peaceable Journey laws?	No	No		
Background checks required for private sales?	No	No		

== State constitutional provisions ==
Article 1, Section 1, Paragraph 7 of the Constitution of Kentucky states, "The right to bear arms in defense of themselves and of the State, subject to the power of the General Assembly to enact laws to prevent persons from carrying concealed weapons."

== Concealed carry ==
Kentucky's concealed carry law, set forth in KRS § 237.110, is "shall-issue". The law is written to allow the carry of concealed "deadly weapons", not just handguns. Although Kentucky allows concealed carry without a permit for those 21 and over, permits are still issued. The permit is called a Concealed Deadly Weapons License (CDWL). The definition of a "deadly weapon", found in KRS § 500.080, includes a wide array of weapons other than guns, including knives (ordinary pocket knives or hunting knives are specifically classified as not being "deadly weapons"), clubs, blackjacks, nunchaku, shuriken, and brass knuckles (including knuckles made from other hard materials). All CDWLs are issued for 5 years. Only Kentucky residents are eligible to apply for and obtain the permit.

Kentucky's law in this area has a few distinctive features:

- Active and honorably discharged military personnel who apply for licenses are no longer required to undergo training on state laws related to legal liability and the use of deadly force. (Updated March 29, 2014)
- Applicants cannot be in arrears on child support obligations in an amount that would equal or exceed that accumulated in one year of nonpayment.
- The required firearms safety course can be no longer than 8 hours, and also includes a mandatory marksmanship test, in which the applicant must hit a full-sized silhouette target from 7 yards with at least 11 out of 20 rounds fired. (The distance is not stated in the statute, but is set forth in the administrative regulations governing the course.)

Under KRS § 237.110 (20)(a), Kentucky recognizes all currently valid concealed carry permits issued by other U.S. jurisdictions regardless of age.

On March 16, 2011, a change to KRS § 527.020 was signed into law by Governor Steve Beshear allowing guns to be carried without a permit in any factory-installed compartment within the passenger area of a vehicle. Previously, such carry was only allowed in a glove compartment.

On March 11, 2019, Governor Matt Bevin signed into law Senate Bill 150 that eliminated the requirement of a permit to concealed carry in Kentucky. Open carry is allowed without a permit, and is specifically protected in the Kentucky State Constitution as decided in Holland v Commonwealth.

=== Prohibited places ===
KRS § 237.110, which governs the issue of permits, also lists places where concealed carry is prohibited. Per KRS § 237.110 (16), concealed carry is prohibited in:

(a) Any police station or sheriff's office;
(b) Any detention facility, prison, or jail;
(c) Any courthouse, solely occupied by the Court of Justice courtroom, or court proceeding;
(d) Any meeting of the governing body of a county, municipality, or special district (If passed by local ordinance); or any meeting of the General Assembly or a committee of the General Assembly, except that nothing in this section shall preclude a member of the body, holding a concealed deadly weapon license, from carrying a concealed deadly weapon at a meeting of the body of which he or she is a member;
(e) Any portion of an establishment licensed to dispense beer or alcoholic beverages for consumption on the premises, which portion of the establishment is primarily devoted to that purpose;
(f) Any elementary or secondary school facility without the consent of school authorities as provided in KRS § 527.070, any child-caring facility as defined in KRS § 199.011, any day-care center as defined in KRS § 199.894, or any certified family child-care home as defined in KRS § 199.8982, except however, any owner of a certified child-care home may carry a concealed firearm into the owner's residence used as a certified child-care home;
(g) An area of an airport to which access is controlled by the inspection of persons and property; or
(h) Any place where the carrying of firearms is prohibited by federal law.

The prohibition against carrying concealed in an establishment that serves alcohol applies only to the "portion of the establishment [is] primarily devoted to that purpose." This means that concealed carry is allowed in restaurants that serve alcohol, with only the bar section (if present) off-limits to permit holders. This assumes that the owner has not posted the establishment to prohibit concealed carry. (KY preemption does not allow for the banning of "open carry" but only of "concealed carry".)

KRS § 237.110 (17) authorizes private businesses to prohibit concealed carry on their premises (not open carry). Although, only once asked to leave the premises may the gun owner be duly cited for trespassing or disturbing the peace. However, "facilities renting or leasing housing" are specifically prohibited from restricting concealed carry. Private employers can prohibit their employees or permit holders from having weapons concealed in employer-owned vehicles, but cannot prohibit concealed weapons in individually owned vehicles. Public employers (i.e., state and local governments) can prohibit carry within their buildings, but cannot prohibit the carry of weapons by employees or permit holders in any vehicle, with the exception of the Justice and Public Safety Cabinet, which can prohibit employees from carrying any non-duty weapon in a vehicle while they are transporting persons under the employees' jurisdiction or supervision. This provision was upheld against the University of Kentucky in 2012 by the Kentucky Supreme Court, which held that the university could not prevent legal carry of weapons in personal vehicles.

== Reciprocity ==
Though Kentucky observes all other states licenses, not all states observe Kentucky's. The following is a list of states that have reciprocity with Kentucky:

- Alabama
- Alaska
- Arizona
- Arkansas
- Colorado
- Delaware
- Florida
- Georgia
- Idaho
- Indiana
- Iowa
- Kansas
- Louisiana
- Michigan
- Minnesota
- Mississippi
- Missouri
- Montana
- New Hampshire
- Nebraska
- Nevada
- North Carolina
- North Dakota
- Ohio
- Oklahoma
- Pennsylvania
- South Carolina
- South Dakota
- Tennessee
- Texas
- Utah
- Vermont
- Virginia
- West Virginia
- Wisconsin
- Wyoming

== Other laws ==
KRS § 237.104 prohibits the state from seizing firearms from private citizens in the event of a disaster or emergency.

Suppressors are legally transferable in Kentucky.

Some counties have adopted Second Amendment sanctuary resolutions.

With respect to the prohibition of weapons on school property, KRS § 527.070 (3)(a) states that adults who are not pupils of the school may have weapons in their vehicles as long as they do not remove the weapons from the vehicle or brandish them while on school property.

Visitors are permitted to carry guns into the capitol building in Frankfort, though other potential weapons (such as sticks) are prohibited.
