= Campus carry in the United States =

Carrying a firearm on college campuses

In the United States, campus carry refers to the possession of firearms on college or university campuses. Each state has its own discretion on laws concerning campus carry.

A map of campus carry laws in the United States: Mandatory (guns always allowed) Institutional (campuses can choose) Non-permissive (guns banned)

As of 2025, 19 states ban the carrying of a concealed weapon on a college campus; 12 states allow individual colleges and universities to make decisions on whether to prohibit or permit the carrying of a concealed weapon on their campuses; 11 states (either because of state legislation or judicial decision) permit the carrying of concealed weapons on public post-secondary college campuses; and two states (Utah, West Virginia) have a specific state law requiring all public colleges and universities to allow the carrying of concealed weapons on their property.

== History ==
The first state to legalize campus carry on a statewide basis was Utah in 2004. In 2012, in a lawsuit brought by the activist group Students for Concealed Carry, the Colorado Supreme Court ruled that the 2003 Colorado Concealed Carry Act prohibited public universities in the state from regulating the possession of concealed handguns on campus. Before the 2012 decision, the University of Colorado System, although not other Colorado public universities had banned firearms possessions on its property, as a non-binding state attorney general's opinion stated that the University of Colorado was not subject to the Concealed Carry Act.

== Public opinion ==
Campus carry falls under the general gun debate in the United States.

=== Argument in opposition ===
Opponents believe that permitting firearms in a classroom would lead to disruption in the learning processes of students and diminish the overall safety of students. "Ball State University found that 78% of students from 15 Midwestern colleges and universities would feel unsafe if students, faculty and visitors carried concealed firearms on campus" (Marc Randsford, 2014). In a study published in 2012, survey results from two college campuses indicated a majority of faculty, students, and staff (73%) did not want qualified individuals to be able to carry a gun on campus, 70% did not feel safer with more concealed guns on campus, and 72% did not think armed faculty, students, and staff would promote a greater sense of campus safety.

=== Argument in favor ===
Proponents of campus carry argue that because 94% of mass shootings occur in gun-free zones, when carry is permitted on campus, mass shootings will decrease. Additionally, there has been no recorded increase in violence on campuses with campus carry. Proponents argue that college campuses are open to the public by nature, so campus carry restrictions are in practice not enforced because it is infeasible to do so, and so bad actors are not stopped by the restrictions. This argument is also used to address the concern that permissive campus carry would make students less safe, anyone can bring a concealed weapon on their person, even onto a campus with restrictions on campus carry. Finally, proponents argue that campus carry bans violate the Second Amendment. In June of 2022, the Supreme Court in NYSRPA v. Bruen held that the right to carry a firearm extends outside the home, with limited exceptions that are unlikely to apply to college campuses.

== Campus carry by state ==
There are three different forms of campus carry laws that states enact: mandatory, institutional, or non-permissive.

Mandatory refers to a law or court decision which requires a publicly funded institution to generally allow firearms on campus, though some locations may be exempted depending on the school policy (e.g. in a secure area, or at a sporting event). Restricted areas vary by state and individual school; refer to a school's specific policy for details. Some states require the firearm to be concealed (e.g. Texas) while others allow concealed or open carry (e.g. Utah).

Institutional refers to the decision of each institution to determine whether to allow firearms on campus. School firearm policies generally do not have the force of law. The majority of institutions in these states opt to ban guns with a few exceptions (e.g. Liberty University).

Non-permissive refers to the prohibition of firearms on any institutional property by law, with limited exceptions.

For full details for each state, including references to state laws and campus policies, see references.

Status of campus carry, by jurisdiction
Jurisdiction	Mandatory	Institutional	Non-permissive	Notes
Alabama		check		
Alaska		check		
Arizona		check		May keep a gun in a locked car in parking lot.
Arkansas	check			Effective September 1, 2017. Enhanced concealed carry permit holders only. Concealed carry only; open carry is forbidden. May carry, but not store, firearms in university-owned or -operated dormitories/residence halls. May not carry "into a location where an official meeting is being conducted in accordance with documented grievance and disciplinary procedures as established by the university, provided that certain other requirements are met." May not carry in a public preschool or K-12 school. Under state law, the Arkansas State Hospital and the University of Arkansas for Medical Sciences "may submit security plans to the State Police to obtain permission to designate certain sensitive areas off-limit to firearms, and colleges and universities may do the same while hosting or sponsoring collegiate athletic events, as specified." May keep a gun in a locked car in parking lot.
California			☒	May carry only with permission of institutional authorities; otherwise guns banned.
Colorado			☒	May carry concealed as per the Concealed Carry Act of 2003. Affirmed by the Colorado Supreme Court in 2012 that public universities may not ban guns for persons who have concealed carry permits. In 2024 Colorado signed legislation to ban Campus Carry except for permit holders in Campus Parking Lots.
Connecticut		check		
Delaware		check		
District of Columbia			☒	
Florida			☒	May keep a gun in a locked car in parking lot.
Georgia	check			Effective July 1, 2017. Allows the holders of concealed-carry permits who are 21 years of age to carry concealed firearms on some parts of campus, as well as to leave firearms in locked vehicles. Carrying of firearms is not permitted in dormitories; fraternity and sorority houses; gymnasiums and athletic venues; "classrooms used to teach high school students in dual enrollment programs"; "faculty, staff and administrative offices"; "rooms where disciplinary hearings are held"; and campus child-care centers.
Hawaii		check		
Idaho	check			Enhanced Concealed Weapons License (ECWL) only.
Illinois			☒	May keep a gun in a locked car in parking lot.
Indiana		check		
Iowa			☒	Weapons banned on campus.
Kansas	check			Effective July 1, 2017. Concealed carry only. No permit required. Gun ban allowed only if "adequate security measures" are in place. Adequate security measures includes the use of metal detectors, armed personnel, metal detecting wands, etc.
Kentucky		check		May keep a gun in a locked car in parking lot.
Louisiana			☒	May carry only with permission of institutional authorities; otherwise guns banned. May keep a gun in dormitory. May keep a gun in a locked car in parking lot.
Maine		check		
Maryland		check		
Massachusetts			☒	
Michigan		check	☒	State law bans the concealed carry of guns in dormitories or classrooms of colleges, but not college grounds. Open carry is not illegal. May also carry if the parent of a child in school. May also carry at Michigan State University grounds but not buildings. More information here. May keep a gun in a locked car in parking lot.
Minnesota		check		Colleges may only forbid carrying by employees and students. Only employment or academic sanctions may be imposed; no criminal charges. Non-employees/non-students can carry. May keep a gun in a locked car in parking lot.
Mississippi	check			Permit holders who have taken a voluntary instructional course on the safe handling of firearms may carry on school property.
Missouri			☒	
Montana	check			Effective June 1, 2021, both concealed and open carry are allowed at all public institutions. While no permit is required, one must have received training that would make one become eligible for a permit.
Nebraska			☒	May keep a gun in a locked car in parking lot.
Nevada			☒	May carry, or keep a gun in a locked car in parking lot, only with permission of institutional authorities; otherwise guns banned.
New Hampshire		check		
New Jersey			☒	
New Mexico			☒	May keep a gun in a locked car in parking lot. May carry openly or concealed while in a motor vehicle on campus if 19+, but carrying on-foot while on campus is prohibited. Exceptions exist for university-sponsored shooting events and ROTC programs.
New York			☒	
North Carolina			☒	May keep a gun in a locked car in parking lot.
North Dakota		check		May keep a gun in a locked car in parking lot. Additionally, enacted HB 1588 of 2025 grants the State Board of Higher Education the authority to permit firearms on school properties and in university buildings.
Ohio		check	☒	No law against open carry on college grounds (not buildings) thus making open carry institutional. However, open carry by students of that institution may be subject to code of conduct violations/discipline. May carry concealed only with permission of institutional authorities; otherwise concealed carry banned. May keep a gun in a locked car in parking lot.
Oklahoma			☒	May carry only with permission of institutional authorities; otherwise guns banned. May keep a gun in a locked car in parking lot.
Oregon		check		In 2021, the state legislature passed SB 554, which states that each campus may choose whether to ban firearms. Prior to that, firearms were allowed on campus grounds pursuant to an Oregon Court of Appeals ruling from 2011.
Pennsylvania		check		
Rhode Island		check		
South Carolina			☒	May carry only with permission of institutional authorities; otherwise guns banned. May keep a gun in a locked car in parking lot.
South Dakota	check			Allows campus carry with enhanced permit.
Tennessee			☒	Full-time employees of public colleges/universities with handgun carry permits may carry concealed; students/general public cannot. May keep a gun in a locked car in parking lot.
Texas	check			Effective August 1, 2016, for four-year universities; August 1, 2017, for community colleges. Concealed carry only; open carry is forbidden. Must have a license to carry. Limited gun-free zones are allowed for specific sensitive places. Private institutions may opt out, and all have done so, with the exception of Amberton University.
Utah	check			Both concealed and open carry are allowed at all public institutions.
Vermont		check		
Virginia		check		
Washington		check	☒	University of Washington: may carry only with permission of institutional authorities; otherwise guns banned. All other public universities: institutional.
West Virginia	check			In March 2023, West Virginia Governor Jim Justice signed into law Campus Carry for all Public Universities in the state effective July 2024.
Wisconsin	check			Campus buildings are exempted if signs posted.
Wyoming	check			Under the new law, individuals with valid concealed carry permits issued by the State of Wyoming may carry concealed handguns in most public campus facilities; it allows campuses to prohibit open or unlicensed carry on public campuses. It also does not recognize permits issued by other states for campus carry purposes. On University of Wyoming campus grounds (as opposed to inside facilities), both open and unlicensed carry are allowed.

== See also ==
- Gun politics in the United States
- School shootings
- Higher education in the United States
- Concealed carry in the United States
- Gun politics
