= Constitutional carry =

Right of a citizen of a given territory to carry a concealed firearm without a permit

In the United States, the term constitutional carry, also called permitless carry, unrestricted carry, or Vermont carry, refers to the legal public carrying of a handgun, either openly or concealed, without a license or permit. As of February 2025, 29 states recognize some form of permitless carry. The phrase does not always refer to the unrestricted carrying of a long gun, a knife, or other weapons. The scope and applicability of constitutional carry may vary by state.

The phrase "constitutional carry" reflects the idea that the Second Amendment to the U.S. Constitution does not allow restrictions on gun rights, including the right to carry or bear arms.

The U.S. Supreme Court had never extensively interpreted the Second Amendment until the landmark case District of Columbia v. Heller in 2008. Prior to this, a tapestry of different and sometimes conflicting laws about carrying firearms developed across the nation. In deciding the case, the Court found that self-defense was a "...central component of the 2nd Amendment" and D.C.'s handgun ban was invalidated. The Court further stated that some state or local gun controls are allowed. The Heller case was extended by the Supreme Court in the 2010 decision McDonald v. Chicago, which held that the 2nd and 14th Amendments to the U.S. Constitution were "fully incorporated" and thus the right to "...keep and bear arms applies to the states and not 'in a watered-down version' but 'fully applicable'...", and limits state and local governments in enacting laws that restrict this individual and fundamental right to "...keep and bear arms", for self-defense. In the 2022 decision New York State Rifle & Pistol Association, Inc. v. Bruen the Supreme Court went further, affirming a right to public carry of firearms and imposing a strict new standard of scrutiny on state-level firearms laws based on the text, history, and tradition of the second amendment.

== U.S. jurisdictions that have constitutional carry ==
Requirement to obtain a concealed carry permit by state/territory (2025): Permit not required Permit required

As of March 7, 2024, Alabama, Alaska, Arizona, Arkansas, Florida, Georgia, Idaho, Indiana, Iowa, Kansas, Kentucky, Louisiana, Maine, Mississippi, Missouri, Montana, Nebraska, New Hampshire, North Dakota (concealed carry only), Ohio, Oklahoma, South Carolina, South Dakota, Tennessee (handguns only), Texas, Utah, Vermont, West Virginia, and Wyoming generally allow most law-abiding adults to carry a loaded concealed firearm without a permit. Certain states may impose additional restrictions on the legal ability to carry without a permit beyond those who are not prohibited from owning a firearm. Permitless concealed carry in Mississippi only covers certain manners of carrying. Permitless carry in Oklahoma applies to both residents and nonresidents 21+ as well as 18+ nonresidents who can carry without a permit in their home state. All aforementioned jurisdictions do not require a permit to openly carry either except for North Dakota and certain localities in Missouri. On July 26, 2014, Washington, D.C., became a permitless carry jurisdiction for a few days when its ban on carrying a handgun was ruled unconstitutional, and the ruling was not stayed. The ruling stated that any resident who had a legally registered handgun could carry it without a permit, and nonresidents without felony convictions could carry as well. The ruling was then stayed on July 29, 2014.

In June 2015, following victory in a class-action suit brought by "Damas de la Segunda Enmienda" Ladies of the Second Amendment (an affiliate of the Second Amendment Foundation) the Commonwealth of Puerto Rico's carry and licensing regulations were struck down, eliminating the requirement to obtain a permit. On October 31, 2016, The Supreme Court of Puerto Rico denied a motion for reconsideration of a previous Court of Appeals decision that had found the Weapons Act to be constitutional.

Vermont does not have any provision for issue of concealed-carry licenses, as none has ever been necessary nor constitutionally allowed. As such, Vermont residents wishing to carry handguns in other states must acquire a license from a state which is valid in their destination. All other constitutional carry states previously had concealed-carry license requirements prior to adoption of unrestricted carry laws, and continue to issue licenses on a shall-issue basis for the purposes of inter-state reciprocity (allowing residents of the state to travel to other states with a concealed weapon, abiding by that state's law).

=== Alabama ===
On March 10, 2022, Alabama Governor Kay Ivey signed House Bill 272 into law (effective January 1, 2023) eliminating the requirement to obtain a permit in order to carry a concealed pistol in the state, as well as carrying a loaded pistol in a vehicle. Open carry without a permit was already legal for residents and non-residents 18+ before this legislation was enacted.

=== Alaska ===
On June 11, 2003, Alaska governor Frank Murkowski signed House Bill 102 into law (effective September 9, 2003), making Alaska the first state to rescind its requirement for a concealed carry permit. The bill eliminated the crime of simply carrying a concealed weapon by changing the definition of the crime. The section of law that describes the first instance of "misconduct involving weapons in the 5th degree" now requires that a person must either fail to inform a law enforcement officer of the weapon upon contact, fail to allow the law enforcement officer to secure the weapon (or to properly secure the weapon him/herself) upon contact, or if at another person's home, fail to obtain permission from a resident to have a concealed weapon on the premises. No permit is required to open carry or conceal carry for both residents and nonresidents. Open carry is 16+ and concealed carry is 21+.

=== Arizona ===
On April 16, 2010, Arizona governor Jan Brewer signed Senate Bill 1108 into law (effective July 29, 2010). The law eliminated the requirement to obtain a permit to carry a concealed weapon in Arizona for those 21 and older who accurately answer a law enforcement officer if asked if carrying a concealed deadly weapon. The process to obtain a permit was left in place so that Arizona residents could still obtain permits in order to carry concealed in other states or to carry in a restaurant or bar that serves alcohol. The open carrying of firearms without a permit was already legal before the passage of the bill.

=== Arkansas ===
Prior to August 16, 2013, Arkansas law (§ 5-73-120) prohibited "...carrying a weapon...with a purpose to employ the handgun, knife, or club as a weapon against a person." Among other exceptions, Arkansas law allowed a defense to the charge of carrying of a weapon if "[t]he person is on a journey..." but did not define what constituted a "journey". Another defense permitted an individual to carry a concealed weapon if the person had a valid concealed weapons license. This provision was generally interpreted to prohibit open carry.

On August 16, 2013, Arkansas enacted Act 746. This act made two major changes. First, it statutorily defined a "journey" as "...travel beyond the county in which a person lives..." Because traveling on a journey is one of the defenses to § 5-73-120, a plain reading of the statute would indicate that the prohibition against carrying a weapon would now apply only to a person traveling within their home county. Second, it modified § 5-73-120 to prohibit "...carrying a weapon...with a purpose to attempt to unlawfully employ the handgun, knife, or club as a weapon against a person." Various firearms groups interpreted this provision to require that the state must now prove that a person actually intends to use a weapon to commit a crime; and without proving this intent, possession of weapons, whether openly or concealed, is now legal.

However, some confusion still existed. On July 8, 2013, Arkansas Attorney General Dustin McDaniel issued an opinion stating that Act 746 did not authorize open carry. On August 18, 2015, Arkansas Attorney General Leslie Rutledge issued a different opinion, saying that open carry of a weapon following Act 746's passage is now generally legal, provided that the person has no intent to unlawfully employ said weapon. Rutledge also opined that, while mere possession of a loaded handgun was formerly sufficient to establish "intent to employ" it as a weapon, such possession is now no longer sufficient to convict someone under § 5-73-120. Rather, the state must now additionally prove intent to unlawfully use the weapon. However, Rutledge also opined that concealed carry generally remains illegal without a permit. Because Act 746 did not remove or modify the other sections of Arkansas law pertaining to issuing concealed weapons permits, she concluded that possession of a concealed weapon without a permit could be construed as meeting the "unlawful purpose" requirement. However, various firearms groups disputed this opinion and argued that, because § 5-73-120 (and specifically subsection (a)) permits unlicensed open carry, the same legal logic would dictate that concealed carry without a permit would also be legal. Further adding to the confusion was the fact that Act 746 changed the list of § 5-73-120 exceptions, including possession while on a journey and possession of a concealed handgun with a concealed handgun permit, from a list of "affirmative defenses" to a list of "permissible circumstances". Rutledge noted in her opinion that such change could be construed as creating a "non-exhaustive list of circumstances under which it is permissible to carry a handgun," thereby permitting a person to assert additional circumstances not spelled out in the statute. She also noted that future legislation would be the best solution to clear up the confusion that Act 746 has caused.

On October 17, 2018, the Arkansas Court of Appeals issued a ruling that clarified that the mere carrying of a handgun is not a crime by itself absent a purpose to attempt to unlawfully employ the handgun as a weapon against a person, and any ambiguity would be found in favor of the defendant per the rule of lenity. This effectively ends the dispute on the legality of permitless carry in Arkansas and allows for the unlicensed open carry and concealed carry of a weapon for both residents and non-residents.

On April 12, 2023, Arkansas Governor Sarah Huckabee Sanders signed SB480 into law. The purpose of SB480 is "to clarify that a license to carry a concealed handgun is not required to carry a concealed handgun in" Arkansas.

=== Florida ===
On April 3, 2023, Florida Governor Ron DeSantis signed HB543 into law (effective July 1, 2023). Florida is the 26th state to pass a permitless concealed carry bill, allowing for people to carry handguns concealed without a permit. This law allows for both residents and non-residents 21 years of age or older to carry concealed handguns, and other weapons including knives concealed, without a concealed carry permit. Florida's open carry ban was declared unconstitutional by Florida First District Court of Appeal on 10 September 2025. Florida Governor Ron DeSantis and Attorney General James Uthmeier welcomed the ruling and ordered law enforcement officers to no longer enforce the ban, effectively making Florida an open carry state. Open and concealed carry of both handguns and long guns, as well as bladed weapons are allowed without a permit for both residents and non-residents.

=== Georgia ===
On April 12, 2022, Georgia Governor Brian Kemp signed SB319 into law which took effect immediately. While Georgia was the 25th state to pass a constitutional carry bill, Georgia is the 22nd state for constitutional permitless carry legislation to take effect. This law allows both residents and non-residents 21 years of age and older to carry handguns, long guns, and other weapons including knives, openly or concealed, in public, without a permit. The legislation also removed the residency requirement for out-of-state permit holders, allowing for both residents and non-residents alike to carry between the ages of 18 and 20 with any out-of-state carry permit.

=== Idaho ===
On March 28, 2016, Idaho Governor Butch Otter signed Senate Bill 1389 into law (effective July 1, 2016). This legislation created an exception for Idaho residents and non-resident active U.S. military members 21+ to carry concealed weapons within city limits without a concealed weapons license as long as they were eligible for such license. Concealed carry outside of city limits was already legal for those eligible for a weapons license 18+ along with open carry within city limits. Concealed carry and open carry are both legal without a permit statewide.

On April 2, 2019, Idaho Governor Bradley Little signed House Bill 206 into law (effective July 1, 2019) lowering the exception age to carry concealed weapons within city limits from 21 to 18.

On March 26, 2020, Idaho Governor Bradley Little signed House Bill 516 into law (effective July 1, 2020) which expanded the exception to carry concealed weapons to any U.S. citizen or non-citizen active U.S. military members.

=== Indiana ===
On March 21, 2022, Indiana Governor Eric Holcomb signed HEA 1296 into law (effective July 1, 2022), making Indiana the 24th state to institute constitutional carry. HEA 1296 legalized both open and concealed carry without a permit for residents and non-residents 18+.

=== Iowa ===
On April 2, 2021, Iowa Governor Kim Reynolds signed HF 756, 60–37 into law (effective July 1, 2021). Along with removing the requirement to obtain a carry permit for both residents and non-residents, this legislation also removed the requirement for a permit to carry a firearm openly within city limits, as previously one was allowed to carry openly without a permit outside of city limits. Allowing both open and concealed carry without a permit statewide.

=== Kansas ===
SB45 was introduced in the Kansas Senate in early 2015. The bill initially passed the Senate 31–7 on February 26. The bill was sent to the House, amended, and passed 85–39 on March 25. The Senate then concurred, passing the amended bill 31–8 (also on March 25). On April 2, the bill was signed by Governor Sam Brownback (effective July 1, 2015), establishing constitutional carry in Kansas. Can carry concealed at 21 years old or older and open carry at 18 years or older without a permit for both residents and nonresidents. Non-residents 18 to 20 may carry concealed but are still required to hold a valid concealed carry permit.

Kansas issues licenses to carry concealed handguns on a shall-issue basis. As of April 2015, over 87,000 current permits are issued. Kansas will continue to issue permits so that Kansas residents may carry in other states that accept Kansas concealed carry permits.

=== Kentucky ===
On February 14, 2019, the Kentucky Senate passed SB150 by a vote of 29–8. It then passed the Kentucky House of Representatives on March 1, 2019, by a vote of 60–37. On March 11, 2019, Governor Matt Bevin signed the bill into law (effective June 27, 2019). It allows residents and non-residents who are 21 years old or older who are otherwise able to lawfully possess a firearm, to carry concealed firearms (or any other weapon) without a permit. Residents and non-residents under 21 may open carry without a permit, or conceal carry if they are a non-residents and hold a valid out-of-state concealed carry permit. Open carry without a permit was already legal for residents and non-residents before passage of the bill and is guaranteed by the State Constitution.

=== Louisiana ===
On June 18, 2022, Louisiana Governor John Bel Edwards signed SB 143 into law (effective August 1, 2022), removing the need for Louisiana residents 21+ who were active duty or honorably discharged military from needing to obtain a permit to carry concealed.

On March 5, 2024, Louisiana Governor Jeff Landry signed SB 1 into law (effective July 4, 2024), making Louisiana the 28th state to pass legislation to allow permitless concealed carry. Specifically, this law allows adults 18+ to carry a concealed weapon without a permit. Open carry without a permit was already allowed for residents and non-residents 17+.

=== Maine ===
On July 8, 2015, Maine Governor Paul LePage signed LD 652 into law (effective October 15, 2015), creating an exception for those over the age of 21 who are not prohibited from possessing firearms to carry a handgun concealed without a permit. The open carry of handguns and long guns was legal without a permit before the passage of this act for those 18+.

=== Mississippi ===
In 2013, the Unlicensed Open Carry Bill was passed to clarify that no permit was needed to open carry at the age of 18+ for residents and non-residents, it was clarified by the Mississippi Supreme Court that the Right to Open Carry was guaranteed by the Mississippi State Constitution. As of July 1, 2015, the concealed carry law was amended to say "no license shall be required under this section for a loaded or unloaded pistol or revolver carried in a purse, handbag, satchel, other similar bag or briefcase or fully enclosed case." On April 15, 2016, the law was further expanded to include belt and shoulder holsters and sheaths. This effectively allows for constitutional carry in Mississippi for residents and nonresidents age 18+. However, some forms of concealed carrying would still require a permit (e.g. Mexican carry (Note: Carrying concealed on one's person without a holster) or concealed in an ankle holster).

=== Missouri ===
SB 656 allows for permitless concealed carry for anyone who may lawfully own a gun. The bill was passed by the legislature in 2016, but Governor Nixon vetoed it on June 27, 2016. The legislature reconvened for the veto-override session on September 14, 2016. The Senate voted to override the veto with a 24–6 vote (23 required) and the House followed through shortly thereafter with a 112–41 vote (109 required). No permit is needed for open carry or concealed carry and applies to both residents and nonresidents. While no permit is required for either form of carrying, only concealed carry falls fully under state-preemption. Therefore, unlicensed open carry can still be restricted by local city ordinances unless one possesses a concealed carry permit, thus exempting them from local open carry restrictions. The law went into effect on January 1, 2017.

=== Montana ===
On February 18, 2021, Montana Governor Greg Gianforte signed HB 102 into law, which allows residents and nonresidents 18 or older to concealed carry a firearm throughout the state without a permit. Open carry without a permit was already legal for residents and non-residents. HB 102 also removed a number of Montana's "gun-free" zones, which previously prohibited carrying a firearm in select locations throughout the state. HB 102 takes effect immediately, save one provision altering the law on carrying a handgun on college and university grounds, which will go into effect June 1, 2021. This law makes Montana the 18th state to allow permitless carry of a firearm for anyone 18+. Previously, permitless concealed carry was allowed if a person was outside the official boundaries of a city or town or the confines of a logging, lumbering, mining, or railroad camp or who is lawfully engaged in hunting, fishing, trapping, camping, hiking, backpacking, farming, ranching, or other outdoor activity in which weapons are often carried for recreation or protection.

Previously, HB 271 was introduced in 2011 to allow constitutional carry. The bill passed the House with a vote of 55–45 and passed the Senate with a vote of 29–21. It was vetoed by then-Governor Brian Schweitzer on May 10, 2011, and was unable to gather the necessary two-thirds majority to overturn the veto.

HB 298 was introduced in the 2015 legislative session, which would have legalized firearms carry statewide for all persons who are not prohibited from possessing a firearm. The bill passed the House 56-43 and the Senate 28-21 but was later vetoed by Governor Steve Bullock.

=== Nebraska ===
On April 25, 2023, Nebraska Governor Jim Pillen signed LB77 into law which took effect on September 2, 2023, 90 days after the June 9, 2023, last legislative session day. Nebraska is the 27th state to pass a constitutional carry bill, allowing for people to carry handguns without a permit both openly or concealed. This bill also gives Nebraska complete firearm preemption so cities like Omaha and Lincoln can no longer have local ordinances against open carry or anything else relating to firearms.

LB77 did not remove the requirement under Nebraska law that a person generally may not acquire (purchase, lease, rent, or receive transfer of) a handgun from anyone other than their close relatives (spouse, sibling, parent, child, aunt, uncle, niece, nephew, or grandparent) without first obtaining either (1) a certificate from their chief of police or sheriff of their place of residence, or (2) a Nebraska concealed handgun permit. Neb. Rev. Stat. § 69-2403.

=== New Hampshire ===
In early 2017, several senators and representatives introduced New Hampshire Senate Bill 12, which proposed removing the requirement for a license to carry a loaded concealed handgun. The bill also proposed extending the minimum license period from four years to five years, removing the discretionary "suitable person" language from the Pistol/Revolver License law, and directing the state police to pursue reciprocity agreements. On January 19, it was passed by the New Hampshire Senate by a vote of 13–10. Governor Chris Sununu, who took office in January 2017, expressed support for this bill after the Senate vote, stating, "I am pleased that the State Senate today voted to advance common-sense legislation in support of a citizen’s fundamental right to carry a firearm, joining neighboring states throughout the region and across the country." On February 9, it was passed by the New Hampshire House by a vote of 200–97. Governor Sununu signed the bill into law on February 22, 2017, and it became effective immediately. Thus, no permit is required for open carry or concealed carry of handguns; and this applies to both residents and nonresidents 18+.

Previously, carrying a concealed handgun unloaded was legal without a license. A New Hampshire Supreme Court decision in 2013 clarified that the law did not prohibit carrying a concealed handgun if it is unloaded (no round is chambered).

=== North Dakota (concealed carry only) ===
On March 23, 2017, North Dakota Governor Doug Burgum signed House Bill 1169 (effective August 1, 2017). Under its provisions, people carrying concealed without a concealed weapons license will need to carry a form of state-issued photo ID, must inform police about their handgun upon contact, and must not otherwise be prohibited from possessing a firearm by law. Minimum age is 18. Carrying in a vehicle was originally thought of as requiring a permit, but Attorney General Wayne Stenehjem issued an opinion interpreting the law as allowing for constitutional carry within vehicles. This was codified in 2019. Both residents and non-residents still need a permit to open carry. On April 12, 2023, Governor Burgum signed HB 1339, which took effect August 1, 2023, to extend permitless carry to residents of other states.

=== Ohio ===
On March 14, 2022, Ohio Governor Mike DeWine signed Senate Bill 215 (effective June 13, 2022). Under its provisions, any person 21+ (both residents and nonresidents) who meets the definition of a "qualifying adult" under O.R.C. 2923.111, may carry a concealed handgun, as well as carry a loaded handgun in a motor vehicle openly or concealed without a permit. Residents and non-residents under 21 may still open carry, but require a valid concealed handgun license issued by another U.S. jurisdiction to conceal carry. Open carry without a permit was already legal for residents and non-residents.

=== Oklahoma ===
On February 27, 2019, Oklahoma Governor Kevin Stitt signed House Bill 2597 (effective November 1, 2019), which will allow both residents and non-residents 21+ (or 18+ and in the military) to open or concealed carry without a permit. Oklahoma's existing reciprocity also recognizes any concealed carry license issued both as resident and non-resident as well as the permitless carry of other states, so if one is a non-resident and 18+ and their state allows open carry or concealed carry without a permit, they may carry in that fashion so long as they have valid ID proving they are a resident of that state.

=== South Carolina ===
On March 7, 2024, Governor Henry McMaster signed House Bill 3594 into law allowing both open and concealed carry of weapons without a permit for resident and non-resident adults 18+. This law immediately takes effect, making South Carolina the 29th state to enact constitutional carry.

=== South Dakota ===
On January 22, 2019, the South Dakota Senate passed SB 47 by a vote of 23–11. It then passed the House of Representatives on January 29, 2019, by a vote of 47–23. Governor Kristi Noem signed SB 47 on January 31, 2019 (effective July 1, 2019). This change in the law removes the requirement of a permit to concealed carry a handgun for residents and nonresidents 18+. Open carry was already legal without a permit for residents and non-residents.

=== Tennessee (handguns only) ===
On April 8, 2021, Tennessee Governor Bill Lee signed Senate Bill 765 (effective July 1, 2021), making Tennessee the 20th state to institute constitutional carry, eliminating the requirement to obtain a carry permit for both open and concealed carrying of handguns by any unprohibited person, resident or non-resident. It does not apply to long guns, a point of contention among gun rights activists. A carry permit is still required to carry a handgun in buildings posted with "concealed firearms by permit only", state/national parks, campgrounds, greenways and nature trails.

On March 23, 2023, a federal judge approved an agreed upon settlement in the case of Beeler v. Long lowering the legal age to carry a handgun and apply for a carry permit from 21 to 18. Making 18 the effective age to carry in Tennessee under constitutional carry.

=== Texas ===
Signs explaining License to Carry laws

On June 16, 2021, Texas Governor Greg Abbott signed the Firearm Carry Act of 2021 into law, which took effect on September 1, 2021. The Act legalized the carrying of a handgun generally in public without a license, openly or concealed, for both residents and non-residents who are legally able to possess a handgun and have not been convicted in the last five years of misdemeanor bodily assault causing injury, deadly conduct, terroristic threat, or disorderly conduct (display or discharge) of a firearm. Open carry requires the handgun to be carried in a holster. Carrying long guns without a license was already legal. The Act originally decriminalized unlicensed carry for individuals 21 years of age or older; however, the case of Andrews v. McCraw, 623 F.Supp.3d 740 (N.D. Tex. 2022) effectively lowered the age to 18 years of age or older.

=== Utah ===
On February 12, 2021, 2021 Utah Governor Spencer Cox signed HB60 into law (effective May 5, 2021) making Utah the 18th state to institute constitutional carry. It allows for permitless carry, both openly and concealed, for adults over the age of 21. Those ages 18–20 can carry concealed with a provisional permit, any out-of-state permit or open carry if carrying unloaded – two actions away from firing. (Note: e.g. 1) rack the slide to chamber, and 2) pull the trigger; or must carry with no bullet in the next chamber in a revolver, so have to pull the trigger twice to fire.)

Previously, in 2013, HB76 was passed by a two-thirds majority in both the state House and the state Senate, but Governor Gary Herbert subsequently vetoed the bill, stating that the existing gun laws did not restrict one's ability to acquire a concealed carry permit, and "we're not the wild and woolly west." Other attempts had been made to renew the efforts, but had failed because then-Governor Herbert had stated he would veto the effort.

=== Vermont ===
For many decades, the only state to allow "constitutional carry" of a handgun (i.e., without any government permit) was Vermont. From the formation of the 13 original states, "constitutional carry" was the law in all states until the 19th century. By the 20th century, all states except Vermont had enacted concealed carry bans, with the exemption in most states for those citizens with a permit. Due to wording in its state constitution and decisions made by the state courts, Vermont has never been able to have a restriction on the method of how one could carry a firearm, and thus, in this regard, Vermont stood entirely separate from the rest of the United States for quite some time. No permit is required (or offered) for open carry and concealed carry, and this applies to both residents and nonresidents 16+ who can legally own a firearm. Because of this, constitutional carry is still sometimes referred to as "Vermont carry".

=== West Virginia ===
HB 4145 was passed by the West Virginia House on February 8, 2016, and Senate on February 22, 2016, but vetoed by Governor Earl Ray Tomblin on March 3, 2016. The House then voted to override the veto on March 4, 2016, and the Senate voted to override on March 5, 2016. The law took effect on May 24, 2016, making West Virginia the 9th state to implement constitutional carry. The law allows law-abiding citizens and legal residents 18+ to carry concealed without a license. No license was required to open carry for residents and nonresidents 18+.

=== Wyoming ===
On March 2, 2011, Wyoming Governor Matt Mead signed SF0047 into law (effective July 1, 2011) making Wyoming the 3rd state to institute constitutional carry, eliminating the requirement that Wyoming residents obtain a permit in order to carry a concealed pistol in the state. On April 6, 2021, Governor Mark Gordon signed a bill allowing constitutional carry for residents of other states, effective July 1, 2021. Under the latter law, United States citizens and lawful permanent residents age 18 or older may carry concealed without a permit. Open carry has always been legal for residents and non-residents without a permit in Wyoming.

== U.S. states with only permitless open carry ==
Open carry of handguns in the United States

Open carry of long guns in the United States

Legal with no permit/license required
Legal with no permit/license required; possible local restrictions
Legal with permit/license
Anomalous
Illegal

Most U.S. states have historically only regulated the concealed carrying of weapons while leaving the open carrying of legal weapons largely unregulated. The states of Colorado, Delaware, Michigan, Nevada, New Mexico, North Carolina, Oregon, Pennsylvania, Virginia, Washington, and Wisconsin allow for the unlicensed carrying of handguns openly while still requiring a permit for concealed carry. Since these states do not allow for permitless concealed carry they are not considered full constitutional carry states.

=== Colorado ===
Colorado does not regulate the unlicensed open carry of firearms at a state level for those 18+. In 2021, the Colorado General Assembly removed the state's preemption of firearm laws, allowing local jurisdictions to regulate the open carrying of firearms. Colorado also considers one's vehicle an extension of their home, and therefore does not require a permit to carry concealed in a private automobile or some other private means of conveyance.

=== Delaware ===
Open carry without a permit is generally permitted in Delaware for those 18+. In 2014, the Delaware Supreme Court made a ruling that recognized open carry as a long standing fundamental right, and could only be prohibited by local ordinances in effect prior to July 4, 1985. The city of Dover formerly required a permit from the police chief for a state concealed permit to open carry, but this was repealed in October 2015 in accordance with the ruling.

=== Michigan ===
Open carry of a handgun registered to its owner without a permit is generally permitted in Michigan for Michigan residents 18+. A permit is still required to carry in a vehicle.

=== Nevada ===
Open carry without a permit is generally permitted in Nevada for those 18+. For open carry in a vehicle, the firearm may be anywhere except concealed upon the person without a permit.

=== New Mexico ===
Open carry without a permit is generally permitted in New Mexico for anyone 19+.

=== North Carolina ===
Open carry without a permit is generally permitted in North Carolina for those 18+. The preemption laws do not fully encompass open carry, and some municipalities have banned it on town property.

=== Oregon ===
Open carry without a permit is generally permitted under Oregon state law for 18+. However, Oregon law allows a city or county to regulate open carry of loaded firearms in public places, with holders of concealed carry permits being exempt. (ORS 166.173) The cities of Portland, Beaverton, Tigard, Oregon City, Salem, and Independence, as well as Multnomah County, have statutes that do not allow open carry of loaded firearms (unless one has a concealed carry permit).

=== Pennsylvania ===
Open carry is generally legal under Pennsylvania state law for those over the age of eighteen. However, exceptions are made for Philadelphia as a "City of the First Class," in a vehicle, or during a declared state of emergency unless one has a carry permit. On May 31, 2019, the Supreme Court of Pennsylvania ruled that carrying a firearm is not reasonable suspicion to detain someone.

=== Virginia ===
Open carry is generally allowed in Virginia without a permit for people 18 years of age and older. The following cities and counties have exceptions that disallow the open carry of a loaded semi-automatic center-fire rifle or pistol that expels single or multiple projectiles by the action of an explosion of a combustible material and is equipped at the time of the offense with a magazine that will hold more than 20 rounds of ammunition or designed by the manufacturer to accommodate a silencer or equipped with a folding stock or shotguns equipped with a magazine that holds more than 7 rounds: the Cities of Alexandria, Chesapeake, Fairfax, Falls Church, Newport News, Norfolk, Richmond, and Virginia Beach and in the Counties of Arlington, Fairfax, Henrico, Loudoun, and Prince William. These restrictions do not apply to valid concealed carry permit holders.

=== Washington ===
Open carry without a permit is generally permitted in Washington without a permit for those 18+. Open carry of a loaded handgun in a vehicle is legal only with a concealed pistol license.

=== Wisconsin ===
Open carry without a permit is generally permitted in Wisconsin for those over the age of eighteen. A permit is required while open carrying a loaded handgun in a vehicle, since the Wisconsin Supreme Court ruled that carrying a loaded handgun "within reach" constitutes carrying as per the Concealed Carry Act.

== U.S. states that have a limited form of permitless concealed carry ==
Certain states may have a limited form of permitless carry, restricted based on one or more of the following: a person's location, the loaded/unloaded state of the firearm, or the specific persons who may carry without a permit. As of July 3, 2021, three of these states are Illinois, New Mexico, and Washington.

=== Illinois (Non-resident, Unloaded and fully enclosed weapon) ===
In 1996, the Fourth District Illinois Appellate Court ruled that an unloaded handgun carried in a purse did not meet the definition of unlawful use of a weapon per se due to being fully enclosed and possessed in conjunction with a FOID card of an Illinois resident. Following this ruling, a movement started in the early 2000s dubbed Fanny Pack Carry: proponents carried unloaded handguns in fanny packs to protest the state's outright ban on carrying loaded firearms. This resulted in several arrests, but ultimately every criminal prosecution failed and resulted in one successful wrongful arrest lawsuit.

In 2009 the Supreme Court of Illinois ruled that any object that fully encloses a handgun and fastens closed in any form or manner legally constitutes a "case" per se under Illinois Law.

Following this in 2011, before the passage of Conceal Carry in Illinois, the Illinois Department of Natural Resources published a brochure which stated that to transport a firearm on one's person, one must only meet three conditions:

1. Unloaded
2. Enclosed in a case
3. Possessed in conjunction with an Illinois FOID.

The Illinois State Police reaffirmed this in a 2012 brochure that states that a person may have a firearm upon their person as long as it's unloaded and enclosed in a case.

Non-residents of Illinois are specifically exempted from the requirement to have a FOID Card while carrying an unloaded firearm enclosed in a case.

=== New Mexico (unloaded weapon) ===
Under New Mexico law, no permit is required for concealed carry when the handgun is both unloaded and concealed. It is also legal to carry a loaded handgun while in a private vehicle.

=== Washington (outdoor recreational activities) ===
Washington allows for concealed carry without a permit when a person is hiking, hunting, fishing, camping, horseback riding, or performing some other lawful outdoor recreational activity, so long as it is reasonable to assume that they are performing that activity or traveling to or from the activity.

== Ages to carry without a permit ==
State	Open	Concealed
Alabama	18	19**
Alaska	16	21
Arizona	18	21
Arkansas	18	18
Florida	18*	18***
Georgia	21**	21**
Idaho	18	18
Iowa	18	18
Indiana	18	18
Kansas	18	21**
Kentucky	18	21
Louisiana	17	18
Maine	18*	21**
Mississippi	18	18
Missouri	19**	19**
Montana	18	18
Nebraska	18	21
New Hampshire	18*	18*
North Dakota	0	18
Ohio	18*	21
Oklahoma	21****	21****
South Carolina	18	18
South Dakota	18	18
Tennessee	18***	18***
Texas	18***	18***
Utah	18*	21
Vermont	16	16
West Virginia	18	18
Wyoming	18*	18

* Jurisdiction gives no minimum age to carry. Age set at 18 by federal law.

** May carry at age 18 if active or honorably discharged member of the U.S. military.

*** Age to carry set at 18 by court order.

**** Non-residents of Oklahoma from states that allow permitless carry under the age of 21 are allowed to carry without a permit in Oklahoma at the age permitted by their state of residence for permitless carry. May carry at age 18 if active or honorably discharged member of the U.S. military.

== See also ==
- Concealed carry in the United States
- Gun laws in the United States (federal)
- Gun laws in the United States (by state)
- Open carry in the United States
