= Students for Concealed Carry =

Advocacy group organization

- Abbreviation: SCC
- Formation: 2007
- Type: Non-profit
- Legal status: Active
- Website: www.concealedcampus.org

Students for Concealed Carry, formerly Students for Concealed Carry on Campus, is an advocacy group in the United States that promotes "campus carry"—a policy of allowing holders of concealed carry permits to carry concealed handguns on college campuses.

== Background ==
As of 2019, carrying a concealed weapon on a college campus is prohibited in 16 states, while 23 states grant individual colleges and universities the authority to decide whether to allow or prohibit the carrying of concealed weapons on their campuses. 10 states (either because of state legislation of judicial decision) permit the carrying of concealed weapons on public post-secondary college campuses; and one state (Utah) has a specific state law requiring all public colleges and universities to allow the carrying of concealed weapons on their property.

== History and activities ==
The group was formed in 2007, the day after the Virginia Tech massacre. The group has promoted efforts to overturn campus gun bans in several states.

It has held "empty holster protests" in which students supporting the group carry empty holsters to protest bans on the carrying of concealed firearms on college campuses. The group has also held annual national conference in Washington, D.C., television on C-SPAN.

In 2008, SCC (represented by Mountain States Legal Foundation) sued the University of Colorado System and its officials over the university system's ban on "the possession of firearms or other dangerous or illegal weapons on or within" University of Colorado property. In 2012, the Colorado Supreme Court ruled in favor of SCC, holding that the Colorado Concealed Carry Act prohibited the Board of Regents from regulating the possession of concealed handguns on campus.

== Support and opposition ==
The group's efforts to expand campus carry are supported by other gun-rights groups, and are opposed by gun-control groups such as Students for Gun-Free Schools, and the Brady Campaign to Prevent Gun Violence, as well as some students, faculty, staff, and administrators.

== See also ==
- Gun politics in the United States
