= Gun laws in Idaho =

Location of Idaho in the United States

Gun laws in Idaho regulate the sale, possession, and use of firearms and ammunition in the state of Idaho in the United States.

== Summary table ==
Subject / law	Long guns	Handguns	Relevant statutes	Notes
State permit required to purchase?	No	No		
Firearm registration?	No	No		
Semi-automatic weapon law?	No	No		
Magazine capacity restriction?	No	No		
Owner license required?	No	No		
Permit required for concealed carry?	N/A	No	I.C. § 18-3302; I.C. § 18-3302K	Idaho is a "shall issue" state for citizens and lawful permanent residents who are 18 years or older. Regular and Enhanced permits are issued. Permitless carry took effect on July 1, 2016.
Permit required for open carry?	No	No	I.C. § 18-3302	May carry openly without permit.
Castle Doctrine/Stand Your Ground law?	Yes	Yes	I.C. § 19-202A	
State preemption of local restrictions?	Yes	Yes	I.C. § 18-3302J	
NFA weapons restricted?	No	No		
Peaceable Journey laws?	No	No		
Background checks required for private sales?	No	No		

== Idaho gun laws ==
As of July 1, 2020, a concealed weapons license is not required for U.S. citizens and active military members. From July 1, 2019 to July 1, 2020 permitless carry applied only to Idahoans age 18 and older and active military members. Previously, from July 1, 2016 to July 1, 2019 permitless carry applied to Idahoans aged 21 and older and active military members within city limits; the minimum age was lowered to 18 on July 1, 2019 and was also expanded to any weapon. Permitless carry outside city limits was already legal for all persons aged 18 or older. Idaho was the ninth "constitutional carry" or permitless concealed carry state, with Vermont being the first.

Idaho is a "shall issue" state for concealed carry. The local county sheriff shall issue a concealed weapons license to a qualified applicant within 90 days. Applicants may be required to demonstrate familiarity with a firearm, generally by having taken an approved training course or by having received training in the military. A permit is valid for five years; permits issued before July 1, 2006 are valid for four years. Idaho recognizes valid concealed carry permits from all states. A concealed weapon may not be carried at a school (primary or secondary) or at a school-sponsored activity, in a courthouse, in a prison or detention facility, at a psychiatric hospital, or in certain other governmentally designated locations. It is unlawful to carry a concealed weapon while intoxicated.

On July 1, 2013, Idaho legislation came into effect which created an "Enhanced Concealed Weapons License" designed to meet the criterion required by several other states to enter into agreements of reciprocal recognition of Concealed Carry Permits. Among the requirements listed in Idaho statute 18-3302, an applicant must:

- either be a resident of the state of Idaho for six months or hold a license in their state of residency
- complete an eight-hour training course, which shall consist of:
  - instruction on Idaho firearms law conducted by a law enforcement officer or state-bar-certified lawyer
  - instruction on the basic concepts of the safe and responsible use of handguns
  - instruction on self-defense principles
  - live-fire training, including the firing of a minimum of 98 rounds.

As of July 1, 2014, persons with an Idaho "Enhanced Concealed Weapons License" (hereafter "Idaho Enhanced Permit") or qualified retired law enforcement officer are allowed to carry concealed on a public college or university campus. However, this does not apply to student dormitories or residence halls, nor does it apply to a public entertainment or sporting facility that has a seating capacity of 1,000+ persons.

In 2014, Idaho passed HB 69, which declares certain gun control to be unconstitutional, and made it unlawful for any state assets to go toward the enforcement of federal gun laws, an act of de facto nullification.

Open carry is legal in Idaho. A concealed weapons license is not required for open carry, nor for long guns (concealed or not). The firearm being openly carried must be clearly visible. A firearm can also be transported in a vehicle, as long as it is in plain view, or is disassembled or unloaded.

Idaho has state preemption of firearms laws: local units of government cannot regulate the ownership, possession, use, transportation, or carry of firearms, firearm components or ammunition. The state constitution states that "No law shall impose licensure, registration or special taxation on the ownership or possession of firearms or ammunition. Nor shall any law permit the confiscation of firearms, except those actually used in the commission of a felony."

The possession of automatic firearms is permitted, as long as such possession is in compliance with all federal regulations.

Stand-your-ground was passed in 2018. Previously, stand-your-ground was the law in practice based on jury instructions for homicide or battery cases.

== See also ==
- Law of Idaho
