= Gun laws in Arkansas =

Location of Arkansas in the United States

Gun laws in Arkansas regulate the sale, possession, and use of firearms and ammunition in the state of Arkansas in the United States.

== Summary table ==
Subject / law	Long guns	Handguns	Relevant statutes	Notes
State permit required to purchase?	No	No		
Firearm registration?	No	No		
Assault weapon law?	No	No		
Magazine capacity restriction?	No	No		
Owner license required?	No	No		
Permit required for concealed carry?	N/A	No	AR Code § 5-73-120; AR Code §§ 5-73-301 to 5-73-320	Arkansas is a "shall issue" state for citizens and lawful permanent residents who are 21 years or older. Regular and Enhanced permits are issued. Enhanced permits are issued to those who complete a training course. Permitless carry took effect on August 16, 2013. Enhanced concealed carry permits allow for carrying in some areas such as carrying at public colleges, most public buildings, non-secure locations in airports, churches, and more.
Permit required for open carry?	No	No	AR Code § 5-73-120	
Castle Doctrine/Stand Your Ground law?	Yes	Yes	AR Code §§ 5-2-601 to 5-2-621	
State preemption of local restrictions?	Yes	Yes	AR Code § 14-16-504	
NFA weapons restricted?	Yes	No	AR Code § 5-73-207	Machine guns may not fire pistol cartridges of .30 in. or 7.63 mm or larger unless the gun is registered to an ammunition corporation.
Shall certify?	Yes	Yes	AR Code § 5-73-112	Shall certify within 15 days.
Peaceable Journey laws?	Yes	Yes	AR Code § 5-73-120	
Background checks required for private sales?	No	No		
Duty to inform?	Yes	Yes		

== Arkansas gun laws ==
Automatic weapons must be registered with the Arkansas secretary of state, in addition to being registered under federal law.

Some counties have adopted Second Amendment sanctuary resolutions and a statewide law was adopted on April 29, 2021.

== Open and concealed carry ==
As of August 16, 2013, permits are no longer required to concealed carry a handgun. However, there was some confusion over the legality of permitless carry in Arkansas. For concealed carry, Arkansas still offers CCW permits on a "shall issue" basis. Open carry of handguns is legal by a simple reading of the law, yet some Arkansas state officials denied that it was legal. Applicants must pass a background check and complete a training course to receive a new or renewal concealed carry license. An existing license is suspended or revoked if the license holder is arrested for a felony or for any violent act, becomes ineligible due to mental health treatment, or for a number of other reasons. Concealed firearms may not be carried in a courthouse, meeting place of any government entity, athletic event, places of higher education, or in a number of other places.

On October 17, 2018, the Arkansas Court of Appeals issued a ruling that clarified that the mere carrying of a handgun is not a crime by itself absent a purpose to attempt to unlawfully employ the handgun as a weapon against a person, and any ambiguity would be found in favor of the defendant per the rule of lenity. This effectively ends the dispute on the legality of permitless carry in Arkansas, allowing for both open and concealed carry without a permit in Arkansas.

=== Act 746 ===
Amended portion of AR statute 5-73-120 (description of "carrying a weapon" as seen from a legal standpoint):

(a) A person commits the offense of carrying a weapon if he or she possesses a handgun, knife, or club on or about his or her person, in a vehicle occupied by him or her, or otherwise readily available for use with a purpose to attempt to unlawfully employ the handgun, knife, or club as a weapon against a person.

The Act's other subsections go on to describe the specific circumstances in which one may legally carry that weapon. Though the language in some of Act 746 had created confusion over the legalities of open and concealed carry without a permit with some state officials and law enforcement, it has since been amended to correct these confusions and goes on to describe the specific instances and places where it is legal to carry a weapon.

Background on the confusion that surrounded Act 746:

While constitutional gun rights advocates and most law enforcement agencies have tried to argue that Act 746 legalizes open and concealed carry in Arkansas without a permit, Attorney General Dustin McDaniel at the time, issued a non-binding opinion on July 8, 2013, stating that Act 746 applies only to persons who are carrying firearms while "on a journey across or through Arkansas," that open carry remains illegal and that a valid permit is still required for concealed carry for those who are not traveling across Arkansas. In his opinion written to State Senator Eddie Joe Williams, Attorney General McDaniel defined a journey as "travel beyond one's county of residence," but further stated it would be ultimately up to the discretion of law enforcement officials and county prosecutors as to whether or not persons carrying without a valid permit would be arrested and prosecuted.

In August 2015, Attorney General Leslie Rutledge issued a non-binding opinion that open carry is legal while not affecting concealed carry, and that a concealed carry license is still required:

Opinions on open carry:

In my opinion, Act 746's amendments to § 5-73-120 mean that (1) the statute only criminalizes a person's "possess[ing] a handgun on or about his or her person, in a vehicle occupied by the person, or otherwise readily available for use" if he or she simultaneously has the intent "to attempt to unlawfully employ the handgun ... as a weapon" against a person, and (2) this unlawful intent may not be presumed simply because that person possesses a loaded handgun.

Opinions on Concealed Carry:

Nothing in Act 746, § 5-73-120(a), or this opinion is intended to suggest a person may carry a concealed handgun in public without a properly issued concealed-carry license. In fact, except during a journey, it is likely that the Arkansas Supreme Court would allow the presumption that a person who has flouted the concealed-carry licensing scheme in Arkansas law by possessing a concealed handgun without a concealed-carry license has the requisite unlawful intent for a violation of § 5-73-120(a).

Point 4 requires additional explanation. In my opinion, a person may not lawfully carry a concealed handgun in public without a properly issued concealed-carry license. I believe this necessarily follows from the concealed-carry licensing scheme that predates Act 746 and that, in my opinion, was unaffected by Act 746. The licensing requirement is recognized in the "concealed handgun" exception under § 5-73-120.

Attorney General Leslie Rutledge has also stated that open carry may generate reasonable suspicion for an officer to stop and briefly detain a person.

[A]ny person who carries a handgun should be aware that a law enforcement officer might lawfully inquire into that person's purpose. Determining culpability or potential culpability under Ark. Code Ann. § 5-73-120 is initially a matter for law enforcement following guidelines that routinely apply when investigating a misdemeanor involving the danger of forcible injury to persons. A law enforcement officer may stop and detain any person reasonably suspected of violating § 5-73-120 if necessary to identify the person or determine the lawfulness of his or her conduct. Whether an officer has reasonable suspicion will depend upon a number of circumstance-specific factors. Some of these factors are recounted in Ark. Code Ann. § 16-81-203 (Repl. 2005), including: (1) the demeanor of the suspect; (2) the gait and manner of the suspect; (3) any information received from third persons; and (4) the suspect's proximity to known criminal conduct. While merely possessing a loaded handgun completely on its own is not enough for reasonable suspicion of a violation of § 5-73-120(a), possessing a loaded handgun in combination with just one additional factor may, depending on the circumstances, be enough to create reasonable suspicion of intent to unlawfully employ the handgun as a weapon (and thus reasonable suspicion of a violation of § 5-73-120(a)).

— Opinion No. 2015-064 by Attorney General Leslie Rutledge

Despite these non-binding opinions, most local courts have thrown out or dropped the charges on carrying a weapon. One case was ruled guilty in a lower court in Bald Knob. The defendant appealed and the court dismissed the case potentially setting a precedent that open carry is legal. Regardless of what some state or law enforcement officials' views are on Act 746, most agencies and citizens agree with sponsors of the Act, that Arkansas is a constitutional carry state.
