= Gun laws in North Dakota =

Location of North Dakota in the United States

Gun laws in North Dakota regulate the sale, possession, and use of firearms and ammunition in the state of North Dakota in the United States.

== Summary table ==
Subject / law	Long guns	Handguns	Relevant statutes	Notes
State permit required to purchase?	No	No		
Firearm registration?	No	No		
Assault weapon law?	No	No		
Magazine capacity restriction?	No	No		
Owner license required?	No	No		
Permit required for concealed carry?	N/A	No	62.1-03-01; 62.1-04-03	North Dakota is a "shall issue" state for citizens and lawful permanent residents who are 18 years or older. Class 1 permits are issued to those 21 or older, and Class 2 permits are issued to those 18 or older. Permitless carry took effect on August 1, 2017.
Permit required for open carry?	No	Yes	62.1-03-01	May carry openly without permit.
Castle Doctrine/Stand Your Ground law?	Yes	Yes	12.1-05-07	
State preemption of local restrictions?	Yes	Yes	62.1-01-03	"A political subdivision, including home rule cities or counties, may not enact a zoning ordinance or any other ordinance relating to the purchase, sale, ownership, possession, transfer of ownership, registration, or licensure of firearms and ammunition which is more restrictive than state law."
NFA weapons restricted?	No	No	62.1-01-01	Binary triggers are not considered machine guns.
Shall certify?	Yes	Yes	62.1-05-03	Shall certify within 30 days.
Peaceable Journey laws?	No	No		
Background checks required for private sales?	No	No		
Duty to inform?	Yes	Yes	62.1-04-04	Only when carrying without a permit.

== Concealed carry ==
North Dakota is a "shall issue" state for concealed carry. The North Dakota Bureau of Criminal Investigation (BCI) shall issue a concealed weapon permit to a qualified applicant. The applicant must pass a written exam and submit an application to the local law enforcement agency, which conducts a local background check before forwarding the application to the BCI. The permit is valid for five years. A concealed weapon permit is required when transporting a loaded firearm in a vehicle. Concealed carry is not allowed in the part of an establishment that is set aside for the retail sale and consumption of alcoholic beverages. Concealed carry is allowed in the restaurant part of a liquor establishment if an individual under twenty-one years of age is not prohibited in that part of the establishment. Concealed carry is also not allowed, unless permitted by local law, at a school, church, sporting event, or public building.

== Constitutional concealed carry ==
On March 23, 2017, a bill permitting constitutional carry was signed by Governor Doug Burgum. As of August 1, 2017, people carrying concealed without a concealed weapons license will need to carry a form of state-issued photo ID, must be a North Dakota resident for at least 1 year, must inform police about their handgun upon contact, and must not otherwise be prohibited from possessing a firearm by law. The existing concealed weapons licenses, Class 1 & 2, will continue to be available to allow cross state reciprocity. Open carry of a loaded handgun will still require a permit. Carrying in a vehicle was originally thought of as requiring a permit but Attorney General Wayne Stenehjem issued an opinion interpreting the law as allowing for constitutional carry within vehicles. This was codified in 2019. The residency requirement was removed in 2023.

== Second Amendment Sanctuary State ==
Some localities have adopted Second Amendment sanctuary resolutions.

On April 22, 2021 Governor Doug Burgum signed HB 1383, which limits enforcing or assisting in the enforcement of federal firearms laws enacted after January 1, 2021 that are more restrictive than state law. On April 26, 2021, Burgum also signed a proclamation which designated North Dakota as a "Second Amendment Sanctuary State."

Text of the Proclamation Include:

- Whereas, The Second Amendment of the United States Constitution protects the right to keep and bear arms
- Whereas, Article I, Section 1 of the North Dakota Constitution imparts certain inalienable rights upon its citizens, among those being the right to keep and bear arms to defend person, family, property and the state; these rights shall not be infringed
- Whereas, The state has protected the rights of its citizens to possess and carry firearms
- Whereas, The state of North Dakota will stand against federal overreach and attempts to limit rights to own and use guns
- Whereas, President Biden and the United States Congress have announced the intentions to pursue measures that will infringe on the right to keep and bear arms
- Whereas, North Dakota will continue to take all necessary steps to defend our constitutional right to keep and bear arms.

== Other laws ==
North Dakota has state preemption of firearms laws. No political subdivision may enact any ordinance relating to the purchase, sale, ownership, transfer of ownership, possession, registration, or licensure of firearms and ammunition which is more restrictive than state law.

Firearms manufacturers, distributors, and sellers are not liable for any injury suffered because of the use of a firearm by another. However, they may be sued for breach of contract or warranty, or for defects or negligence in design or manufacture.

Firearm buyback programs are prohibited by state law.
