= Gun laws in Minnesota =

Location of Minnesota in the United States

Gun laws in Minnesota regulate the sale, possession, and use of firearms and ammunition in the state of Minnesota in the United States.

== Summary table ==
| Subject / law | Long guns | Handguns | Relevant statutes | Notes |
|---|---|---|---|---|
| State permit required to purchase? | No* | Yes | §624.7131 | Permit to purchase required to transfer/purchase long guns with a pistol grip and handguns through FFL dealers. A permit to carry also acts as a permit to purchase for Minnesota residents. Traditional rifles and shotguns may be purchased without a permit. |
| Firearm registration? | No | No | | |
| Assault-style weapon law? | Yes | Yes | §624.7131 | Persons 18 and older may purchase assault-style weapons with a permit to purchase (or permit to carry for persons 21 and older). |
| Magazine Capacity Restriction? | No | No | | |
| Owner license required? | No | No | | |
| Permit required for concealed carry? | N/A | Yes | §624.714 | Shall Issue. Minnesota Permit to Carry a Pistol required to carry handguns. Concealment is permitted but not required. |
| Permit required for open carry? | Yes | Yes | §624.7181 | Whoever carries a BB gun, rifle, or shotgun on or about the person in a public place is guilty of a gross misdemeanor. A person under the age of 21 who carries a semiautomatic military-style assault weapon on or about their person in public place is guilty of a felony. However, one may carry a pistol or a long gun openly with permit to carry a pistol because, the law states that the prohibition on carrying does not include the carrying of a BB gun, rifle, or shotgun by a person who has a permit under section 624.714. |
| State Preemption of local restrictions? | Yes | Yes | §471.633 | Municipalities may regulate the discharge of firearms within their borders. |
| NFA weapons restricted? | Yes | Yes | §609.67 | Machine guns and short-barreled shotguns, unless designated Curios & Relics, are prohibited in most cases. Some destructive devices are prohibited in most cases. Sound suppressors and short barreled rifles are legal. |
| Peaceable Journey laws? | Yes | Yes | §97B.045 §624.714, Subd. 9 | Any legally possessed gun may be transported in a motor vehicle, provided it is unloaded and cased. |
| Background checks required for private sales? | No* | Yes | https://www.revisor.mn.gov/statutes/cite/624.7132 | Long guns also require a background check if equipped with a pistol grip. As explained in subdivision 2, a background check for a private sale can be more thorough than the background check for a sale through a FFL holder. |

== Permits to carry ==
As of March 1, 2026, there were 381,405 permits issued to carry openly or concealed in Minnesota.

- The county sheriff must either issue or deny a permit within 30 days of the application date.
- New and renewal permits are valid for five (5) years from the date of issuance. Emergency permits are valid for 30 days.
- Landlords may not restrict the lawful carry or possession of firearms by tenants or their guests.
- Private establishments can ban any firearms and must post a legal notice banning guns on their premises or personally notify patrons that guns are not allowed. (624.714 Subd. 17.b1)
- Sheriff's departments which wrongfully deny an applicant (as determined by the courts) are responsible for reimbursing legal fees incurred by applicant.

=== Restrictions ===
- Must be a citizen or permanent resident of the United States
- Must complete an application
- Must not be prohibited from possessing a firearm under Minnesota Statute 624.714 (Criminal background & mental health history check)
- Must not be listed in the criminal gang investigation system
- If a Minnesota resident, must reside in the county in which the application for a permit is made; non-residents may apply to any Minnesota county sheriff.
- Must present evidence of training in the safe use of a pistol. (Training completed within one year of an original or renewal application. – 624.714, Subd. 2a)

=== Places Prohibited by statute ===
- K-12 School property (Note: Public colleges and universities may make administrative policies prohibiting the carry of firearms by students and employees. However, such policies are not laws and do not have the authority of laws, nor may peace officers enforce such policies under the color of law.) (Note: With the exception of religious organizations, no public or private entity may prohibit the carry or storage of firearms within vehicles in parking lots.) (Note: The carrying of firearms on school and day care facility property is allowed with written permission from the principal or other person in general control of the school, or the director of a child care center. Exiting a vehicle with a firearm is only allowed to place the firearm in the trunk of the vehicle, unless written permission has been received.)
- A childcare center while children are present
- State correctional facilities or state hospitals and grounds (MN Statute 243.55)
- Any jail, lockup or correctional facility (MN Statute 641.165)
- Courthouse complexes, unless the sheriff is notified (Note: In 2015, this notification became automatic with the issuance of a permit.)
- Offices and courtrooms of the Minnesota Supreme Court and Court of Appeals
- In federal court facilities or other federal facilities (Title 18 U.S.C.§ 930)

Minnesota is a "shall issue" state for Permit(s) to Carry a Pistol openly or concealed.

Some counties have adopted Second Amendment sanctuary resolutions.

== Sales ==
=== Private sales ===
There are private seller regulations in Minnesota. Private sales do require a background check.

A private seller is guilty of a gross misdemeanor if a private transfer is made to a prohibited person, who can be reasonably suspected as a prohibited person, who then uses or possesses the firearm during the commission of a felony crime of violence within one year of the transfer.

=== Gun shows ===
All federally licensed firearms dealers must perform background checks at gun shows.

== See also ==
- Hunting license
