= Gun laws in Montana =

Location of Montana in the United States

Gun laws in Montana regulate the sale, possession, and use of firearms and ammunition in the state of Montana in the United States.

== Summary table ==
Subject / law	Long guns	Handguns	Relevant statutes	Notes
State permit required to purchase?	No	No		
Firearm registration?	No	No		
Assault weapon law?	No	No		
Magazine capacity restriction?	No	No		
Owner license required?	No	No		
Permit required for concealed carry?	N/A	No	MCA § 45-8-316; MCA § 45-8-321	Montana is a "shall issue" state for citizens and lawful permanent residents who are 18 years or older. Permitless carry took effect on February 18, 2021.
Permit required for open carry?	No	No	MCA § 45-8-311	May carry openly without permit.
Castle Doctrine/Stand Your Ground law?	Yes	Yes	MCA § 45-3	
State preemption of local restrictions?	Yes	Yes	MCA § 45-8-351	Localities may regulate firearm discharge and the open or unpermitted concealed carry of weapons to a publicly owned and occupied building.
NFA weapons restricted?	No	No		
Peaceable Journey laws?	No	No		
Background checks required for private sales?	No	No		Missoula enacted a universal background check ordinance in 2016, however Attorney General Tim Fox opined that the ordinance is unlawful. In October 2018, a state judge ruled that the ordinance was lawful but the ordinance was struck down unanimously by the Montana Supreme Court on October 22, 2019.

== Montana gun laws ==
Montana has some of the most permissive gun laws in the United States. It is a "shall issue" state for concealed carry. The county sheriff shall issue a concealed weapons permit to a qualified applicant within 60 days. Concealed carry is allowed in state and local government buildings with a permit. Carrying a concealed weapon while intoxicated is prohibited. No weapons, concealed or otherwise, are allowed in school buildings. Montana recognizes concealed carry permits issued by most but not all other states. Concealed carry without a permit is allowed throughout the state.

Open carry is always allowed without a permit.

Montana has state preemption of most firearms laws. Local units of government may not prohibit, register, tax, license, or regulate the purchase, sale or other transfer, ownership, possession, transportation, use, or unconcealed carrying of any weapon. However, local governments may restrict the firing of guns and the open or unpermitted concealed carrying of firearms in public buildings.

Montana has a number of restrictions on lawsuits against firearms manufacturers, dealers, or trade associations. Such lawsuits may be filed by the state, but not by local governments.

Montana House Bill 246, the Montana Firearms Freedom Act, was signed into law by Governor Brian Schweitzer on April 15, 2009, and became effective October 1, 2009. This legislation declares that certain firearms and firearms accessories manufactured, sold, and kept within the state of Montana are exempt from federal firearms laws, since they cannot be regulated as interstate commerce.

Effective June 1, 2021, both concealed and open carry are allowed at all public institutions (colleges, universities, etc.). While no permit is required, one must have received training that would make one become eligible for a permit. The law is being challenged by the Office of the Commissioner of Higher Education as a violation of their authority to oversee campus policy.

== HB258 ==
In the spring of 2021, Governor of Montana signed bill HB258 into law. The bill prohibits Montana state and county level law enforcement from assisting federal agencies in enforcing any gun regulations passed after January 1, 2021.

== See also ==
- Law of Montana
