= Gun laws in Alaska =

Location of Alaska in the United States

The U.S. state of Alaska has very permissive gun laws and very few regulations regarding the sale, possession, and use of firearms and ammunition compared to those in most of the contiguous United States. Alaska was the first state to adopt carry laws modeled after those of Vermont, where no license is required to carry a handgun either openly or concealed. However, permits are still issued to residents, allowing reciprocity with other states and exemption from the Federal Gun Free School Zone Act. The legal stipulation that gun permits are issued but not required is referred to by gun rights advocates as an "Alaska carry," as opposed to a "Vermont carry" (or "Constitutional carry"), where gun licenses are neither issued nor required. Some city ordinances do not permit concealed carry without a license, but these have been invalidated by the recent state preemption statute.

Alaska prohibits any type of carry in schools, domestic violence shelters, courts, and correctional institutions. Carrying is also prohibited in any place where alcohol is served for on-site consumption, with an exception for restaurants that serve alcohol, as long as one is not consuming alcohol while carrying. When encountering a police officer, a person carrying a concealed weapon is required by law to inform the officer that they are carrying, and to cooperate if the officer chooses to temporarily seize the gun for the length of the encounter. The possession of any firearm while intoxicated is illegal.

On July 9, 2010, Governor Sean Parnell signed the Alaska Firearms Freedom Act (HB 186), declaring that certain firearms and accessories are exempt from federal regulation and made it unlawful for any state assets to go toward the enforcement of federal gun laws, an act of de facto nullification. The text can be read here. On September 10, 2013, Governor Parnell signed HB 69, which amended and expanded HB 186. The text can be read here.

== Summary table ==
Subject / law	Long guns	Handguns	Relevant statutes	Notes
State permit required to purchase?	No	No		
Firearm registration?	No	No		
Assault weapon law?	No	No		
Magazine capacity restriction?	No	No		
Owner license required?	No	No		
Permit required for concealed carry?	N/A	No	AS 11.61.220; AS 18.65.700	Alaska is a "shall issue" state for citizens and lawful permanent residents who are 21 years or older. Permitless carry took effect on September 9, 2003.
Permit required for open carry?	No	No		May carry openly without permit.
State preemption of local restrictions?	Yes	Yes	AS 29.35.145	
NFA weapons restricted?	No	No		
Castle Doctrine / Stand your ground law?	Yes	Yes	AS 11.81.330	"A person who is justified in using nondeadly force in self-defense may use deadly force in self-defense upon another person when and to the extent, the person reasonably believes the use of deadly force is necessary for self-defense against death; serious physical injury; kidnapping except for what is described as custodial interference in the first degree in AS 11.41.320; sexual assault in the first degree; sexual assault in the second degree; sexual abuse of a minor in the first degree; or robbery in any degree."
Shall certify?	Yes	Yes	AS 18.65.810	Shall certify within 30 days.
Peaceable Journey laws?	No	No		
Background checks required for private sales?	No	No		
Duty to inform?	Yes	Yes	AS 11.61.220(a)(1)(A)(i)	

== See also ==
- Hunting license
- Second Amendment to the United States Constitution
- Victimology
