= Gun laws in Wyoming =

Location of Wyoming in the United States

Gun laws in Wyoming regulate the sale, possession, and use of firearms and ammunition in the state of Wyoming in the United States. Gun laws in Wyoming rank as some of the most permissive in the country.

== Summary table ==
Subject / law	Long guns	Handguns	Relevant statutes	Notes
State permit required to purchase?	No	No		
Firearm registration?	No	No		
Assault weapon law?	No	No		
Magazine capacity restriction?	No	No		
Owner license required?	No	No		
Permit required for concealed carry?	N/A	No	W.S. § 6-8-104	Wyoming is a "shall issue" state for citizens and permanent lawful residents who are 21 years or older. Residents of states that have reciprocity with Wyoming and who possess a permit can also apply for a Wyoming permit. Permitless carry took effect on July 1, 2011.
Permit required for open carry?	No	No		May carry openly without permit.
Castle Doctrine/Stand Your Ground law?	Yes	Yes	W.S. § 6-2-602	"A person who is attacked in any place where the person is lawfully present shall not have a duty to retreat before using reasonable defensive force pursuant to subsection (a) of this section provided that he is not the initial aggressor and is not engaged in illegal activity."
State preemption of local restrictions?	Yes	Yes	W.S. § 6-8-401	"Except as authorized by W.S. 15-1-103(a)(xviii) and 21-3-132, no city, town, county, political subdivision or any other entity shall authorize, regulate or prohibit the sale, transfer, purchase, delivery, taxation, manufacture, ownership, transportation, storage, use, carrying or possession of firearms, weapons, accessories, components or ammunition except as specifically provided by this chapter. This section shall not affect zoning or other ordinances which encompass firearms businesses along with other businesses. Zoning and other ordinances which are designed for the purpose of restricting or prohibiting the sale, purchase, transfer or manufacture of firearms or ammunition as a method of regulating firearms or ammunition are in conflict with this section and are prohibited."
NFA weapons restricted?	No	No	W.S. §§ 6-8-402 to 6-8-406	Wyoming Firearms Freedom Act, passed in 2010, prohibits any government servant from enforcing the NFA if a personal firearm, a firearm accessory, or ammunition is owned or manufactured commercially or privately in Wyoming and remains within the borders of Wyoming. A firearm manufactured in Wyoming must have the words "made in Wyoming" clearly stamped on a central metallic part, such as the receiver or frame. While federal enforcement is still possible, the law penalizes federal agents from enforcing such laws.
Background checks required for private sales?	No	No		

== Wyoming laws ==
According to the Office of the Attorney General of Wyoming, Wyoming state law (W.S. § 6-8-104) provides for the issuance of concealed firearm permits. As a "shall issue" state, the local sheriff's office is required to issue a permit upon request, unless there is a valid reason to deny (such as violent felony conviction). A Wyoming permit is valid for 5 years.

Wyoming also recognizes concealed firearms permits from states with similar licensing requirements (subject to frequent review and revision), which, as of March 2016, includes: Alabama, Alaska, Arizona, Arkansas, Colorado, Florida, Georgia, Idaho, Indiana, Iowa, Kansas, Kentucky, Louisiana, Maine, Michigan, Mississippi, Missouri, Montana, Nebraska, Nevada, New Hampshire, New Mexico, North Carolina, North Dakota, Ohio, Oklahoma, Pennsylvania, South Carolina, South Dakota, Tennessee, Texas, Utah, Virginia, West Virginia and Wisconsin. Many of these states reciprocate and accept a Wyoming permit as valid, however this is a frequently changing and often unspecified distinction. Independent confirmation by directly contacting the attorney general of the state in question is recommended.

Effective July 2011, Wyoming became an unrestricted concealed carry state (for residents only), following the example of Vermont, Alaska and Arizona. Concealed carry permits will still be issued to be used as reciprocal permits in certain states. On April 6, 2021, Governor Mark Gordon signed a bill extending permitless concealed carry to non-residents as well. Open carry is allowed without a permit for residents and non-residents.

Some counties in Wyoming have adopted Second Amendment sanctuary resolutions.
