= Gun laws in South Dakota =

Location of South Dakota in the United States

Gun laws in South Dakota regulate the sale, possession, and use of firearms and ammunition in the state of South Dakota in the United States.

== Summary table ==
| Subject / law | Long guns | Handguns | Relevant statutes | Notes |
|---|---|---|---|---|
| State permit required to purchase? | No | No | | South Dakota law provides for a Gold Card permit that allows people to skip the NICS check but it is not required to purchase firearms. It is also equivalent to a regular carry permit in terms of reciprocity. |
| Firearm registration? | No | No | | |
| Magazine capacity restriction? | No | No | | |
| Owner license required? | No | No | | |
| Permit required for concealed carry? | N/A | No | SD 23-7-7 | South Dakota is a "shall issue" state for citizens and lawful permanent residents who are 18 years or older. Enhanced permits are issued to those 21 or older, and regular permits are issued to those 18 or older. Permitless carry took effect on July 1, 2019. |
| Permit required for open carry? | No | No | | |
| Castle Doctrine/Stand Your Ground law? | Yes | Yes | SD 22-18-4 | "A person who uses or threatens to use force in accordance with this section does not have a duty to retreat before using or threatening to use force." |
| State preemption of local restrictions? | Yes | Yes | SD 7-18A-36; SD 8-5-13; SD 9-19-20 | No county, township, or municipality "may pass an ordinance that restricts or prohibits, or imposes any tax, licensure requirement, or licensure fee on the possession, storage, transportation, purchase, sale, transfer, ownership, manufacture, or repair of firearms or ammunition or their components." |
| NFA weapons restricted? | No | No | | |
| Peaceable Journey laws? | No | No | | |
| Background checks required for private sales? | No | No | | |

== South Dakota laws ==
South Dakota is a "shall issue" state for concealed carry. Permitless carry of both open and concealed carry is legal as of July 1, 2019 for both residents and non-residents. The local county sheriff shall issue a permit to carry a concealed pistol to qualified applicants. A temporary permit shall be issued within five days of the application. Concealed carry is not permitted at any public elementary or secondary school or in a school vehicle, in any courthouse, or in any establishment that derives over half of its income from the sale of alcoholic beverages which are ingested on site. For non-residents, South Dakota recognizes valid concealed carry permits from any other state.

Open carry is legal in South Dakota and does not require a concealed pistol permit.

When buying a handgun from a Federal Firearms License (FFL) holder, an application to purchase a handgun must be filled out by the buyer and submitted to the FBI NICS by the seller. Beginning June 1, 2009, anyone who passes the federal background check will be able to take possession of any firearm immediately, per SB0070.

South Dakota has state preemption of firearms laws. Units of local government may not restrict the possession, transportation, sale, transfer, ownership, manufacture, or repair of firearms or ammunition or their components. Preemption was further strengthened in 2019 by preventing local governments from restricting, prohibiting, imposing a tax, license requirement, or license fee on any of the above actions, plus the storage and purchase of firearm, ammunition, or components. It also mandates the attorney general to seek injunctive relief from any locality that violates preemption.

Firearms manufacturers, distributors, and sellers are not liable for injury caused by the use of firearms.

Some counties have adopted Second Amendment sanctuary resolutions.

== See also ==
- Law of South Dakota
