= Gun laws in Iowa =

Location of Iowa in the United States

Gun laws in Iowa regulate the sale, possession, and use of firearms and ammunition in the state of Iowa in the United States.

== Summary table ==
Subject / law	Long guns	Handguns	Relevant statutes	Notes
State permit required to purchase?	No	No	724.15	Iowa law provides for a permit to acquire pistols or revolvers but it is not required to purchase firearms. The permit has a three-day waiting period before taking effect.
Firearm registration?	No	No	724.11	"Neither the sheriff nor the commissioner shall require an applicant for a permit to carry weapons to provide information identifying a particular weapon in the application including the make, model, or serial number of the weapon or any ammunition used in that particular weapon."
Assault weapon law?	No	No		
Magazine capacity restriction?	No	No		
Owner license required?	No	No		
Permit required for concealed carry?	N/A	No	724.5; 724.7	Iowa is a "shall issue" state for citizens and lawful permanent residents who are 21 years or older. Permitless carry took effect on July 1, 2021.
Permit required for open carry?	No	No	724.5	May carry openly without permit.
Castle Doctrine?	Yes	Yes	704; 707.6	Civil immunity for use of "reasonable force" in self defense
Stand Your Ground law?	Yes	Yes	704; 707.6	"A person who is not engaged in illegal activity has no duty to retreat from any place where the person is lawfully present before using force..."
State preemption of local restrictions?	Yes	Yes	724.28	"A political subdivision of the state shall not enact an ordinance, motion, resolution, policy, or amendment regulating the ownership, possession, carrying, legal transfer, lawful transportation, modification, registration, or licensing of firearms, firearms attachments, or other weapons when the ownership, possession, carrying, transfer, transportation, or modification is otherwise lawful under the laws of this state."
NFA weapons restricted?	Yes	Yes	724.1	Machine guns and destructive devices illegal. Suppressors legal as of March 31, 2016. Short barreled rifles and shotguns legal as of April 13, 2017.
Shall certify?	Yes	Yes	724.1A	Shall certify within 30 days (suppressors only).
Peaceable Journey laws?	No	No		
Background checks required for private sales?	No	No		

== State constitutional provisions ==
Article I, Section 1A of the Constitution of Iowa states:

"Right to keep and bear arms – The right of the people to keep and bear arms shall not be infringed. The sovereign state of Iowa affirms and recognizes this right to be a fundamental individual right. Any and all restrictions of this right shall be subject to strict scrutiny."

In November 2022, Iowa adopted Constitutional Amendment 1, The Right to Keep and Bear Arms, including the requirement of "strict scrutiny for any alleged violations of the right brought before a court".

== Firearm laws ==
On January 1, 2011, Iowa became a "shall issue" state for a permit to carry weapons on one's person. This applies to both open carry and concealed carry. Applicants must successfully complete an approved training course. The permit is valid for 5 years. On July 1, 2021, Iowa became a constitutional carry state allowing for both open and concealed carry without a permit by both residents and non-residents.

Iowa will honor any valid permit issued by any other state. Persons do not have to be a resident of the state from which the permit was issued.

A Permit To Acquire (PTA), obtained from the sheriff of the county of the applicant's residence, is available to skip the background check before purchasing firearms. A PTA shall be issued to qualified applicants aged 21 or older. The PTA becomes valid three days after the date of application, and is valid for five years. Starting July 1, 2021, a PTA is no longer required to purchase a handgun in the state of Iowa. They are still available, however, as they may be used to substitute a NICS background check.

Iowa has enacted state preemption of firearms laws, so local units of government may not restrict firearms.

Under Iowa law, private citizens may not possess automatic firearms, any firearm "other than a shotgun or muzzle loading rifle, cannon, pistol, revolver or musket" with a bore of more than 6/10 of an inch (unless it is an antique made in or before 1898), or any explosive, incendiary or poison gas destructive device., short-barreled rifles (barrels under 16 inches), and short-barreled shotguns (barrels under 18 inches) may be possessed if federally registered.

== Additional Iowa laws table ==
Subject	Long gun	Handgun	Reference	Remarks
Are permits issued to non-residents?		Yes	724.11	Yes – Normally limited to military and students attending university
What is the permit cost?			724.11	$50 – Some counties charge additional $5–10 for the card
How long is permit processing time?			724.11	Within 30 Days
How many years is the permit valid?			724.7	5 years
State requirement to issue permit		Yes	724.7	Shall-issue
Required to carry permit and ID while carrying?	No	No		
Duty to inform?	No	No	724.4D	"A person carrying a dangerous weapon whose behavior creates a reasonable suspicion that the person presents a danger to the person's self or others shall cooperate with an investigating officer."
Does the permit cover weapons other than firearms?	Yes	Yes	724.7	Yes
Carry in restaurants that serve alcohol?	Yes	Yes	724.4C	Yes. Carry with a BAC over .08 is not allowed.
Carrying on snowmobiles and ATV	No	Yes	321G.13; 321I.14	Rifles must be unloaded and cased. Pistols or revolvers may be carried loaded. If on own property no permit necessary. If not on own property, permit to carry necessary. May not shoot from a moving or running snowmobile or ATV. A non ambulatory person may shoot if the vehicle is not running/moving.
State preemption of local restrictions	Yes	Yes	724.28	"A political subdivision of the state shall not enact an ordinance, motion, resolution, policy, or amendment regulating the ownership, possession, carrying, legal transfer, lawful transportation, modification, registration, or licensing of firearms, firearms attachments, or other weapons when the ownership, possession, carrying, transfer, transportation, or modification is otherwise lawful under the laws of this state." NOTE: Some city and county facilities have been designated as gun free zones contrary to this rule. The Attorney General of Iowa has issued a letter stating this would be allowed under the home rule exception. It has not been tested in court.
Does this state recognize other state's carry permits?		Yes	724.11A	Iowa recognizes a valid permit or license issued by another state to any nonresident of Iowa.
Do private business "No Guns Allowed" signs have force of law?			724.7	No. All permits so issued shall be for a period of five years and shall be valid throughout the state except where the possession or carrying of a firearm is prohibited by state or federal law.
Age restrictions?	18	18	724.22	This statute punishes one who "sells, loans, gives, or makes available" rifles, shotguns, or rifle/shotgun ammunition to another under age 18 and handguns or handgun ammunition to another under age 21. (First offense: serious misdemeanor. Second offense: Class D felony.) The statute clarifies that .22 rimfire ammunition is rifle ammunition, but other cartridges are not specified. The statute includes a handful of exceptions, including direct supervision of a parent, guardian, or spouse over the legal age and sober, service in the military, as a peace officer, as a corrections officer, or as a private security guard. An exception is also granted for a firearms instructor (over the legal age) with consent from one's parent, guardian, or spouse. The statute also punishes one who leaves an unsecured firearm where a minor under the age of 14 can access it with a serious misdemeanor, and that minor's parent, guardian, or spouse may be held civilly liable for injuries that occur. The statute does not specify penalties for cases where an individual merely possess a firearm under the legal age.
The following are places Iowa statutes prohibit carry of a firearm
School grounds	No	No	724.4A; 724.4B	School means public or nonpublic prekindergarten through 12th grade. Unless the person has been specifically authorized by the school to go armed with, carry or transport a firearm on school grounds
School buses	No	No	281-43.38(285)	Iowa Administrative Code makes this a driver restriction – The driver shall not permit firearms to be carried in the bus.
Casinos	No	No	491-5.4(6)	No patron or employee of the licensee, including the security department members, shall possess or be permitted to possess any pistol or firearm within a licensed facility without the express written approval of the administrator
State Fair when the fair is in progress	No	No	Rule 2.5	This was upheld in 2016
State universities and their approved venues	No	No	681-13.14(5) 724.8A	Weapons are not permitted on the campus except for purposes of law enforcement and as specifically authorized for purposes of instruction, research or service. A weapon is any instrument or device which is designed primarily for use in inflicting death or injury upon a human being or animal and which is capable of inflicting death or injury when used in the manner for which it was designed. Weapons include any pistol, revolver, shotgun, machine gun, rifle or other firearm, BB or pellet gun, taser or stun gun, bomb, grenade, mine or other explosive or incendiary device, ammunition, archery equipment, dagger, stiletto, switchblade knife, or knife having a blade exceeding five inches in length. In 2019, a statute was adopted prohibiting public universities and community colleges from restricting non-projectile electrical weapons. Exemptions are provided for stadiums and university-owned hospitals.
The following are places federal law prohibits carry of a firearm
Post offices	No	No	39 CFR 232.1(l)	This includes the parking lot and the facility
Any federal facility	No	No	18 U.S.C. § 930	This means a building or any part of one whether owned or leased by the federal government where federal employees are regularly present for the purpose of performing their official duties
IRS offices	No	No	18 U.S.C. § 930	See above
Federal courthouses	No	No	18 U.S.C. § 930	See above
Ranger stations	No	No	18 U.S.C. § 930	See above
Federal buildings in federal parks	No	No	18 U.S.C. § 930	See above
Airports behind the secure area	No	No	18 U.S.C. § 930; 724.28; AG Opinion 03-4-1	Iowa Attorney General Opinion and letter to Des Moines County Attorney, December 29, 2010 both opine that Iowa home rule rights allow local governments to place restrictions on the use of firearms on city/county property, including airports. Local ordinances ban firearms at airports.
