= Gun laws in Missouri =

Location of Missouri in the United States

Gun laws in Missouri regulate the sale, possession and use of firearms and ammunition in the state of Missouri in the United States.

== Summary table ==
Subject / law	Long guns	Handguns	Relevant statutes	Notes
State permit required to purchase?	No	No		
Firearm registration?	No	No		
Assault weapon law?	No	No		
Magazine capacity restriction?	No	No		
Owner license required?	No	No		
Permit required for concealed carry?	No	No	RSMo 571.030	Missouri is a "shall issue" state for citizens and lawful permanent residents who are 19 years or older. Permitless carry took effect on January 1, 2017.
Permit required for open carry?	No	No	RSMo 21.750; RSMo 571.037	May carry openly without permit, except localities can pass ordinances restricting open carry. Carry permits allow holders to carry openly anywhere in the state.
Castle Doctrine/Stand Your Ground law?	Yes	Yes	RsMo 563	
State preemption of local restrictions?	Yes	Yes	RSMo 21.750	Local governments can regulate the open carry and discharge of firearms. In December 2019, St. Louis passed an ordinance forbidding the carrying of firearms in city parks, athletic fields and facilities, and recreational facilities. A lawsuit challenging the ordinance as a violation of the preemption law is expected.
NFA weapons restricted?	No	No		
Peaceable Journey laws?	Yes	Yes		
Background checks required for private sales?	No	No		

== Concealed carry ==
Missouri Statute 571.070 (8/28/2007) says that it is unlawful for a felon or adjudged incompetent Person to have possession of any firearm (including concealable firearms). Violation of this law is a class D felony. This law was the subject of a challenge, in which a nonviolent felon successfully argued that the law is unconstitutional as applied to him. The law failed muster against the required strict scrutiny test. However, the law was found to be constitutional by the Supreme Court of Missouri.

According to the Revised Statutes of Missouri (RSMo), Section 571.030, a person only commits the crime of carrying a concealed weapon if they carry a concealed weapon into a place where concealed carry is restricted by law, and they do not satisfy one of the exemptions in subsections 2-7, which include having a valid permit or endorsement to carry concealed firearms. Those who hold CCW permits are subject only to fines if they refuse to leave after being asked and a peace officer is summoned, and possible revocation of their permit if they repeatedly do this.

Missouri law exempts the possession of antique firearms, as defined in 18 U.S.C. Section 921, from the provision that specifies a person commits the crime of unlawful possession of a firearm if he or she is a convicted felon possessing a firearm.

In September 2014, Missouri lawmakers passed SB 656 allowing specially trained school employees to carry concealed guns on campuses. It also allows anyone with a concealed weapons permit to carry guns openly in cities or towns with bans against the open carrying of firearms. The age to obtain a concealed weapons permit was also dropped from 21 to 19. Missouri became the 10th state to pass legislation allowing armed school employees since the mass shooting at Sandy Hook Elementary School in Newtown, Connecticut, in 2012. The bill was initially vetoed by Gov. Nixon, but the Missouri legislature overrode the veto during the September veto session.

In September 2016, another Senate bill coincidentally numbered SB 656 was passed allowing permitless concealed carry by anyone 19 years of age or older who may lawfully own a gun. This bill was also vetoed by Governor Nixon, on June 27, 2016. After the Missouri legislature reconvened for the veto-override session on September 14, 2016, the Senate voted to override the veto with a 24 – 6 vote (23 required) and the House followed through shortly thereafter with a 112 – 41 vote (109 required). The permitless carry provision of the bill went into effect on January 1, 2017. The bill instituted a de facto elimination of the minimum age for concealed carry.

A concealed carry permit is required to carry in the state capitol, but one may not carry in the House and Senate chamber floor, gallery and committee meeting rooms.

According to RSMo Section 571.030, there are restrictions on the carrying of firearms concealed or otherwise, for several reasons. Among these are restrictions when knowingly in possession of controlled substances, displaying the weapon in an angry or hostile manner, carries concealed upon or about his or her person a knife, a firearm, a blackjack or any other weapon readily capable of lethal use into any area where firearms are restricted under section 571.107. Exhibits, in the presence of one or more persons, any weapon readily capable of lethal use in an angry or threatening manner.

Some localities have adopted Second Amendment sanctuary resolutions. A statewide sanctuary law was also passed.

== Open carry ==
Missouri allows open carry without a permit, as long as the firearm is not displayed in an angry or threatening manner. Some localities prohibit open carry; however, concealed carry license holders are exempted from this restriction.

Missouri does not prohibit the open carry of any specific weapon, nor do most of the restrictions in RSMo 571.030 apply to the open carry of a firearm or other weapon. It is not a crime under Missouri law to openly carry a weapon into any place where concealed carry is prohibited, except for a church, school bus, school, or onto the grounds of a school function. According to RSMo Section 571.030, there is no age limit to openly carry a handgun, long gun or any weapon.
