= Gun laws in Vermont =

Location of Vermont in the United States

Gun laws in Vermont regulate the sale, possession, and use of firearms and ammunition in the U.S. state of Vermont.

Vermont formerly had very few gun control laws, but in 2018, the state enacted laws requiring background checks for private sales, raising the minimum age to purchase firearms to 21 (16 if purchasing a long gun from a person who is not a federally licensed firearm dealer and the purchaser presents a certificate of satisfactory completion of a hunter safety course that is approved by the Vermont Commissioner of Fish and Wildlife), banning the sale of handgun magazines that hold more than 15 rounds and rifle magazines that hold more than 10 rounds, (Note: High capacity magazines that were lawfully possessed on or before April 11, 2018 may be possessed.) banning the possession of bump stocks, and allowing police to seek a court order to seize guns from anyone deemed an extreme risk. The portion of the law dealing with high capacity magazines has recently been challenged as unconstitutional under Vermont's constitution based upon the right to bear arms (Chapter I, Article 16) and the equal protection clause/"common benefits" clause (Chapter I, Article 7).

The open or concealed carry of firearms is generally unregulated. The state's rural character, along with its strong hunting and outdoor sports traditions, and low homicide rate (6 to 18 per year), have contributed to the state's historically permissive gun policies. Gun dealers are required to keep a record of all handgun sales. State law preempts local governments from regulating the possession, ownership, transfer, carrying, registration or licensing of firearms:

Except as otherwise provided by law, no town, city, or incorporated village, by ordinance, resolution, or other enactment, shall directly regulate hunting, fishing, and trapping or the possession, ownership, transportation, transfer, sale, purchase, carrying, licensing, or registration of traps, firearms, ammunition, or components of firearms or ammunition. This section shall not limit the powers conferred upon a town, city, or incorporated village under subdivision 2291(8) of this title. The provisions of this section shall supersede any inconsistent provisions of a municipal charter. (Added 1987, No. 178 (Adj. Sess.), eff. May 9, 1988.)

The state neither issues nor requires a permit to carry a weapon on one's person, openly or concealed. This is known in the U.S. as constitutional carry. The phrase "constitutional carry" reflects the view that the Second Amendment to the U.S. Constitution does not abide restrictions on gun rights, including the right to carry or bear arms. Vermont is the only state where this has always been the case (hence the alternative term Vermont carry). Vermont law does not distinguish between residents and non-residents of the state; both have the same right to carry without prior state approval while in Vermont.

== History ==
The Vermont Constitution of 1777, dating well before the Bill of Rights to a time when Vermont was an independent republic, guarantees certain freedoms and rights to the citizens: "That the people have a right to bear arms for the defense of themselves and the State – and as standing armies in time of peace are dangerous to liberty, they ought not to be kept up; and that the military should be kept under strict subordination to and governed by the civil power." The city of Rutland passed an ordinance to prohibit the carrying of weapons without permission from the mayor or chief of police but this was struck down by the Vermont Supreme Court in its 1903 State v. Rosenthal decision.

In January 2013, the City of Burlington, Vermont's most populous municipality, approved an ordinance banning assault weapons and certain magazines within its limits. An attempt at gun control at the local level, the ordinance would likely be challenged in court if enforced because Vermont has state preemption of local restrictions. The proposed ordinance was never fully enacted.

Some localities have adopted Second Amendment sanctuary resolutions.

== Summary table ==
Subject / law	Long guns	Handguns	Relevant statutes	Notes
State permit required to purchase?	No	No		Must be 21 to purchase any firearm. May purchase long guns at 16 if purchasing from someone other than a federally licensed firearm dealer and the purchaser presents a certificate of completion of a hunter safety course approved by the Vermont Commissioner of Fish and Wildlife.
Firearm registration?	No	No		
Assault weapon law?	No	No		
Magazine restriction?	Yes	Yes		A gun control bill, passed on March 30, 2018, bans sale or possession of magazines of more than 10 rounds for long guns and 15 rounds for pistols. It was signed by Governor Phil Scott on April 11. Previously owned high capacity magazines are grandfathered.
Owner license required?	No	No		
Permit required for concealed carry?	N/A	No	Vermont Firearm Laws	May carry open or concealed without permit as long as one is a citizen of the U.S. and not otherwise prohibited from possessing firearms under state or federal law.
Permit required for open carry?	No	No		
State preemption of local restrictions?	Yes	Yes	24 V.S.A. § 2295	
NFA weapons restricted?	No	No		Vermont legalized suppressors on June 17, 2015.
Background checks required for private sales?	Yes	Yes		
Red flag law?	Yes	Yes		
Storage requirement?	Yes	Yes	Act 45 2023	Store "in a locked container or equipped with a tamper-resistant mechanical lock or other safety device."
Waiting period?	Yes	Yes	Act 45 2023	Seventy-two hours; waiting period not required for transfers where a background check is not required.

== State constitutional provisions ==
Article I, Section 16 of the Constitution of Vermont states:

That the people have a right to bear arms for the defence of themselves and the State — and as standing armies in time of peace are dangerous to liberty, they ought not to be kept up; and that the military should be kept under strict subordination to and governed by the civil power.

== Firearm carry ==
Vermont state law does not distinguish between the open or concealed carry of any firearm. The Vermont Statutes restrict where civilians may carry firearms, such as courthouses, schools, and school buses, but not how they may carry them. The only exception to this is in Title 10, which states that a "person shall not carry or possess while in or on a vehicle" a loaded long gun, but makes no mention of "openly" or "concealed." The Vermont Supreme Court, in 1903, held that an individual had the right, under the Vermont Constitution, to carry a weapon, openly or concealed, for self-defense (State v. Rosenthal).

== Storage requirement ==
Effective July 1, 2023, it is a crime which can result in fines up to $5000 or imprisonment up to 5 years or both if a firearm is stored negligently and the firearm is misused by a child or by a person who is prohibited from possessing firearms. The law does not apply if the firearm was accessed by the child or prohibited person as the result of an illegal entry, or the firearm is stored "in a locked container or equipped with a tamper-resistant mechanical lock or other safety device." Other details apply.

== See also ==
- Hunting license
