= Gun laws in South Carolina =

Constitution
- Constitution sections: Article I, Section 20
- Synopsis "A well regulated militia being necessary to the security of a free State, the right of the people to keep and bear arms shall not be infringed. As, in times of peace, armies are dangerous to liberty, they shall not be maintained without the consent of the General Assembly. The military power of the State shall always be held in subordination to the civil authority and be governed by it."

Gun laws in South Carolina regulate the sale, possession, and use of firearms and ammunition in the state of South Carolina in the United States.

== Summary table ==
Subject / law	Long guns	Handguns	Relevant statutes	Notes
State permit required to purchase?	No	No		
Firearm registration?	No	No		
Assault weapon law?	No	No		
Magazine capacity restriction?	No	No		
Owner license required?	No	No		
Permit required for concealed carry?	N/A	No	SC Code 23-31-210	South Carolina is a "shall issue" state for citizens and lawful permanent residents who are 18 years or older. Permitless carry took effect on March 14, 2024.
Permit required for open carry?	No	No	SC Code 16-23-20	May carry openly without permit.
Castle Doctrine/Stand Your Ground law?	Yes	Yes	SC Code 16-11-440	
State preemption of local restrictions?	Yes	Yes	SC Code 23-31-510; SC Code 23-31-520	"No governing body of any county, municipality, or other political subdivision in the State may enact or promulgate any regulation or ordinance that regulates or attempts to regulate: (1) the transfer, ownership, possession, carrying, transportation, ammunition, components, or any combination of these things..."
NFA weapons restricted?	No	No		
Peaceable Journey laws?	No	No		
Background checks required for private sales?	No	No		
Duty to inform?	No	Yes	SC Code 23-31-215	

== South Carolina gun laws ==
South Carolina is a "shall issue" concealed carry permit state. No permit is required to purchase rifles, shotguns, or handguns. South Carolina also has "Castle Doctrine" legal protection of the use of deadly force against intruders into one's home, business, or car. It is unlawful to carry a firearm onto private or public school property or into any publicly owned building except interstate rest areas without express permission. Open carry of a handgun will be allowed as of August 18 (open carry of long guns is still lawful), but no permit is required to carry a loaded handgun in the console or glove compartment of a car. As of 3 June 2016, states with which South Carolina has reciprocity are: Alaska, Arizona, Arkansas, Florida, Georgia, Idaho (enhanced permit only), Kansas, Kentucky, Louisiana, Michigan, Missouri, New Mexico, North Carolina, North Dakota, Ohio, Oklahoma, South Dakota (enhanced permit only), Texas, Tennessee, Virginia, West Virginia, and Wyoming. South Carolina only recognizes resident permits from the states with which it has reciprocity; non-resident permits from those states will not be honored. South Carolina does issue a CCW permit to a non-resident from a non-reciprocal state only if the non-resident owns real property in South Carolina as per Title 23 Chapter 31 Article 4 Section 23-31-210

South Carolina law also now supports a "stand your ground" philosophy under the "Protection of Persons and Property Act" SECTION 16-11-440(C) with the following language. The act was ruled non-retroactive in State v. Dickey.

A person who is not engaged in an unlawful activity and who is attacked in another place where he has a right to be, including, but not limited to, his place of business, has no duty to retreat and has the right to stand his ground and meet force with force, including deadly force, if he reasonably believes it is necessary to prevent death or great bodily injury to himself or another person or to prevent the commission of a violent crime as defined in Section 16–1–60.

South Carolina also has the "alter-ego" clause with respect to the defense of others, under which a person who uses deadly force to defend a friend, relative or bystander will be allowed the benefit of the plea of self-defense if that plea would have been available to the person requiring assistance if they had been the one who used deadly force. In other words, the person intervening is deemed to "stand in the shoes" of the person on whose behalf he is intervening. If that individual "had the right to defend himself, then the intervening party is also protected by that right. To claim self-defense, a person has to be in a place they have a legal right to be, not be involved in any illegal activity, must not have started the confrontation, and must be in imminent danger of death or serious bodily harm.

Some counties have adopted Second Amendment sanctuary resolutions. A statewide sanctuary law was also passed.
