= Gun laws in Indiana =

Location of Indiana in the United States

Gun laws in Indiana regulate the sale, possession, and use of firearms and ammunition in the U.S. state of Indiana. Laws and regulations are subject to change.

== Summary table ==
| Subject / law | Long guns | Handguns | Relevant statutes | Notes |
|---|---|---|---|---|
| State permit required to purchase? | No | No | | |
| Firearm registration? | No | No | | |
| Assault weapon law? | No | No | | |
| Magazine capacity restriction? | No | No | | |
| Owner license required? | No | No | | |
| Red Flag law? | Yes | Yes | IC 35-47-14-6 | |
| Permit required for concealed carry? | N/A | No | IC 35-47-2-1; IC 35-47-2-1.5; IC 35-47-2-3 | Indiana is a "shall issue" state for citizens and lawful permanent residents who are 18 years or older. Permitless concealed carry took effect on July 1, 2022, for residents and non-residents 18 or older |
| Permit required for open carry? | No | No | IC 35-47-2-1; IC 35-47-2-3 | Permitless open carry took effect on July 1, 2022, for residents and non-residents 18 or older. Carry of long guns is generally permitted. On May 9, 2017, the Indiana Supreme Court ruled that detaining an individual based solely upon their possession of a handgun (in order to verify that they are licensed) violates the Fourth Amendment absent any other reasonable articulable suspicion of a crime being committed. |
| Castle Doctrine/Stand Your Ground law? | Yes | Yes | IC 35-41-3-2 | |
| State preemption of local restrictions? | Yes | Yes | IC 35-47-11.1-2 | |
| NFA weapons restricted? | No | No | | |
| Shall certify? | Yes | Yes | IC 35-47-8.5-2 | Shall certify within 15 days. |
| Peaceable Journey laws? | No | No | | |
| Background checks required for private sales? | No | No | | |

== State constitutional provisions ==
Article I, Section 32 of the Constitution of Indiana states, " The people shall have a right to bear arms, for the defense of themselves and the State.".

== State preemption ==
Local laws regulating the possession and ownership of ammunition, firearms and shooting accessories are prohibited per IC 35–47–11.1–2, subject to the exemptions listed in IC 35–47–11.1–4. (New provisions effective 2011 Jul 01.)

Municipalities may regulate the discharge of firearms, and as such it may be illegal to discharge a firearm within city limits. However, it is generally legal to discharge firearms on one's own property if located outside the city limits and with an adequate backstop.

In Indianapolis, it is unlawful to discharge a firearm;

1.) Within the "police special service district", which is the pre-unigov, old Indianapolis city limits, per Ordinance 451-2.

2.) "On property controlled or operated by the board of parks and recreation, or located in or on any park or playground", per Ordinance 631-118.

3.) "Across or upon any public street or place, or toward a public way from any private premises", per Ordinance 451-3.

4.) "Along or upon any reservoir owned, controlled or leased by Citizens Energy Group", per Ordinance 451-6.

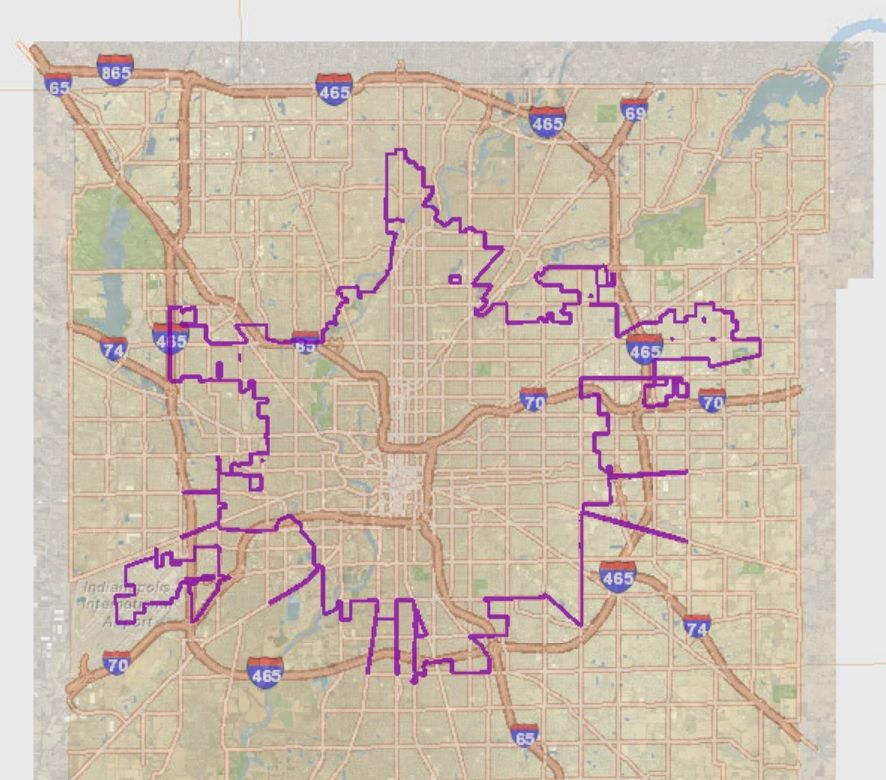
Indianapolis police special service district

In March 1989 the Northwest Indiana cities of Gary and East Chicago city councils passed ordinances prohibiting both sale and possession of assault weapons. Both of these ordinances were invalidated under statewide pre-emption.

Some counties have adopted Second Amendment sanctuary resolutions.

== Carrying handguns ==
A handgun may be carried virtually anywhere in Indiana except for the following exceptions: In or on school property (locked in a vehicle is OK), on a school bus, in or on property that is being used by a school for a school function, private school, head start, preschool programs, on commercial or charter aircraft, controlled access areas of an airport, on the premises of the annual Indiana State Fair, shipping ports controlled by Indiana Port Commission, riverboat casinos, or any place where the carrying of firearms is prohibited by Federal Law. Prohibitions by businesses are not enforced under the color of law, although management may eject a person for carrying.

There are, however, very specific exceptions concerning the lawful possession and carrying of handguns and other firearms on school property and school functions. For instance, under Indiana Code 35-47-9-1, there is also an exception for "persons lawfully permitted" to carry a handgun to carry a handgun on their person, concealed or otherwise, on school property or at school functions if said person is in the process of "transporting" an individual to or from a school or a school function. Under Indiana Code 20-26-9-4, a lawfully permitted person may be authorized by a school board to carry on school premises. There is also an exception for law enforcement officers of "federal, state, and local" agencies as well. However, unless actively engaged in taking an individual to or from school or a school function, authorized by the school board, or one is a law enforcement officer, a handgun is not permissible on school property, except with regard to the above and aforementioned requirement of having the firearm locked in a vehicle as found in Indiana Code 35-47-9-2.

Indiana is a "shall issue" state for the License To Carry a Handgun. A license to carry will be issued to individuals age 18 or older who meet a number of legal requirements. Currently, both limited term and unlimited lifetime licenses are available. As of July 1, 2022, constitutional carry took effect allowing both open and concealed carry without a permit for residents and non-residents.

Grounds for disqualification include a conviction for a felony or for misdemeanor domestic battery. A license can also be denied if the applicant has been arrested for a violent crime and "a court has found probable cause to believe that the person committed the offense charged". Documented substance abuse within a certain time frame is a disqualifier, as is documented evidence of any given person's "propensity for violent or emotionally unstable conduct."

Indiana residents, or non-residents with a "regular place of business" in Indiana, may obtain an Indiana license. Application for a license must be made to the local police department, or absent that, to the county police department. Five-year and lifetime licenses are issued for Indiana residents. Out-of-state residents may only be issued five-year licenses, except active-duty military who become stationed in Indiana. Active duty military stationed in Indiana can apply for lifetime licenses through their local city or county police department. License holders are required to notify the State Police within 60 days of a change of name or address.

As of July 1, 2019, licenses will be issued for five years. As of July 1, 2020, there will be no fee for five-year licenses.

== Restricted locations ==
It is illegal for anyone, except for law enforcement officers and authorized school resource officers, to possess a firearm on school property (K-12 and day care) or on a school bus, except that lawful gun owners may have guns in their vehicles on school property provided that the gun is stored out of plain sight in the person's locked motor vehicle or that the driver is only transporting someone to, or from, a school event. It is also illegal to carry a firearm on a commercial airplane or in the controlled section of an airport, on a riverboat gambling cruise, at the Indiana State Fair, courthouses and the Indiana Statehouse and Government Center. Carrying on Army Corps of Engineers property which include Brookville Lake, Cagles Mill Lake, Cecil M. Harden Lake, J. Edward Roush Lake, Mississinewa Lake, Monroe Lake, Patoka Lake, and Salamonie Lake is restricted according to CFR Title 36, Chapter 111, Part 327.

Private businesses may restrict or forbid firearms on their properties. However, signs prohibiting concealed weapons in private businesses do not have force of law in Indiana, although refusing to leave such a place for carrying a weapon, if requested by the property owner, would constitute trespassing. However, a 2010 law prohibits employers from discharging employees for in-vehicle firearms possession on business property. Furthermore, an employer may not ask any employee about the possession of firearms and/or ammunition.

== Ownership and purchase ==
Firearms dealers or private individuals may not sell any firearm to someone less than 18 years old, or less than 23 years old if the buyer was "adjudicated a delinquent child for an act that would be a felony if committed by an adult", to a person who is mentally incompetent or is a drug or alcohol abuser, or who is otherwise not a "proper person" as defined by Indiana Code 35-47-1-7.

All NFA-regulated weapons and devices are legal in Indiana.

== Reciprocity ==
Indiana has outright recognition of out-of-state carry permits by non-residents issued by any other state or foreign country. The out-of-state permit is treated the same as it would be in the non-resident's home state or country, meaning that any restrictions placed on the permit by the issuing authority would also apply to the non-resident while they are in Indiana. As of July 2022, residents of Indiana no longer need a license to carry issued by Indiana in order to legally carry a handgun in the state.

The following states have established arrangements where they recognize or honor permits or licenses issued by the State of Indiana: Alabama, Alaska, Arizona, Arkansas, Colorado, Florida, Georgia, Idaho, Iowa, Kansas, Kentucky, Louisiana, Maine, Michigan, Mississippi, Missouri, Montana, New Hampshire, North Carolina, North Dakota, Ohio, Oklahoma, Pennsylvania, South Dakota, Tennessee, Texas, Utah, Vermont, Virginia, West Virginia, Wisconsin, and Wyoming.

Neighboring Illinois does not honor Indiana carry licenses, and Indiana residents are not eligible for an Illinois non-residents concealed carry license. However, under the Illinois concealed carry law, a non-resident who is licensed to carry in their state of legal residence can carry a handgun in a vehicle, as long as the handgun remains within the vehicle. As such, an Indiana license holder can legally drive into Illinois with a handgun concealed in the vehicle as of 2014.

== Firearm (handgun) license statistics ==
In January 2013, the Indiana State Police Firearms Section began publishing quarterly reports that show the number of active handgun licenses held by Indiana residents. As of January 1, 2019, there were 890,360 active licenses to carry firearms issued by Indiana, with 27.6% being issued to females. In 2018, 4.8% of all applicants were rejected for various reasons, 16.6% of rejected applicants being female.

== Loss of firearm rights ==
Both Indiana and Federal laws restrict purchase and possession under certain circumstances. Federal law prohibits possession of firearms for life by those convicted of felonies and for those convicted of misdemeanors involving domestic violence. Indiana law prohibits as follows:

- IC 35-47-2-1 prohibits carrying handguns or possession within dwelling by those convicted of domestic battery.
- IC 35-47-4-6 states that it is a Class A misdemeanor for a person convicted of domestic battery to possess a firearm.
- IC 35-47-2-7 prohibits transfer or sale of firearms to any person with a felony conviction.
- IC 35-47-4-5 prohibits possession of firearms for convictions of "serious violent felonies".

While Indiana law mirrors federal law for the most part, it does not ban those with non-violent felonies from possession of firearms. Therefore, a person with a non-violent felony in Indiana would be allowed to possess a firearm under Indiana law, but because federal law prohibits possession in this instance, that person would be unable to purchase a firearm since purchasing a firearm is subject to federal law and a NICS background check.

== Restoration of firearm rights ==
In December 2019, Indiana attorney general Curtis Hill issued an opinion stating that if a person who was convicted of a felony later had their conviction expunged from their criminal record, then in addition to having their rights restored under state law, they would be eligible to possess a firearm under federal law.

For those barred from possession because of a conviction for domestic battery, Indiana Code § 35-47-4-7 allows one to petition the court for restoration of the right after 5 years from the date of conviction.

== Other laws ==
In Indiana, the police may temporarily confiscate firearms from people who are threatening to harm themselves or others. No warrant or judge's signature is necessary. The police must submit a written statement describing why the person whose guns were seized is considered dangerous, and the person can respond at a hearing. Within 14 days a judge must agree that probable cause exists, or the person's guns must be returned.

Indiana provides lawsuit protection to law-abiding manufacturers, sellers, and trade associations for the misuse of firearms by third parties. Lawsuits are permitted for cases of damage or injury caused by defective firearms or ammunition, or breach of contract or warranty.

Indiana's law about self-defense (and the defense of others) can be found at Indiana Code, Title 35, Article 41, Chapter 3–2.

Suppressors are legal in the state of Indiana with the correct provisions and tax stamps to the correct federal entities and may be used for hunting.

The information in this article is either directly stated (or inferred) from Indiana Code, Title 35, Article 47, Chapters 1–14, Title 34, Article 28, Chapter 7 and Title 34, Article 12, Chapter 3.
