= Gun laws in Louisiana =

Location of Louisiana in the United States

Gun laws in Louisiana regulate the sale, possession, and use of firearms and ammunition in the state of Louisiana in the United States.

== Summary table ==
Subject / law	Long guns	Handguns	Relevant statutes	Notes
State permit required to purchase?	No	No		
Firearm registration?	No	No		
Assault weapon law?	No	No		
Magazine capacity restriction?	No	No		
Owner license required?	No	No		
Permit required for concealed carry?	N/A	No	La. R.S. 40:95; La. R.S. 40:1379.3	Louisiana is a "shall issue" state for citizens and lawful permanent residents who are 21+.: Effective July 4, 2024, adults 18+ will no longer be required to have a permit to carry a concealed weapon.
Permit required for open carry?	No	No		May carry openly without a permit.
Castle Doctrine/Stand Your Ground law?	Yes	Yes	La. R.S. 14:19	
State preemption of local restrictions?	Yes	Yes	La. R.S. 40:1796	Full firearm and bladed weapon preemption.
NFA weapons restricted?	No	No		
Peaceable Journey laws?	No	No		
Background checks required for private sales?	No	No		
Duty to inform?	No	Yes	La. R.S. 40:1379.3	

== Louisiana's gun laws ==
Louisiana is a "shall issue" state for concealed carry. The Louisiana Department of Public Safety and Corrections shall issue a concealed handgun permit to qualified applicants, after performing an NICS background check and giving the local police 10 days to provide additional information about the applicant. An applicant must demonstrate handgun proficiency by taking a training course from an approved instructor or by having been trained while serving in the military. Concealed carry is not permitted in any portion of the permitted area of an establishment that has been granted a class A-General retail permit to sell alcoholic beverages for consumption on the premises, in any place of worship, government meeting place, courthouse, police station, polling place, parade, or in certain other locations.

Open carry of firearms in Louisiana is permitted without a permit, as long as the user is at least 18 years of age and legally able to possess a firearm under state and federal law.

Louisiana has state preemption of firearms laws. Government bodies other than the state may not sue firearms manufacturers, dealers, or trade associations for damages that are the result of lawful activities. St. Mary Parish has adopted a Second Amendment sanctuary resolution.

== See also ==
- Law of Louisiana
