= Gun laws in Michigan =

Location of Michigan in the United States

Gun laws in Michigan regulate the sale, possession, and use of firearms and ammunition in the U.S. state of Michigan.

The State of Michigan has numerous laws concerning the ownership and the carrying of firearms. Generally, federal, state, and local law enforcement agencies, and agents thereof acting in an official capacity, are exempt from Michigan's firearms regulations. The Constitution of Michigan of 1963 Article 1, Section 6 reads, "Every person has a right to keep and bear arms for the defense of himself and the state."

A complete listing of Michigan's firearms laws can be found in the publication "Firearms Laws of Michigan." This publication is dated October 2013 and does not yet reflect recent changes to the laws.

== Summary table ==
| Subject / law | Long guns | Handguns | Relevant statutes | Notes |
|---|---|---|---|---|
| State permit required to purchase? | Partial | Yes | MCL § 28.422 | A license to purchase (issued by a police department) or a Michigan-issued Concealed Pistol License (CPL) is required to purchase a long gun (private sales only) or a handgun (both private sales and dealer sales). Applicants must undergo a background check to receive a license to purchase or a CPL. |
| Firearm registration? | No | Yes | MCL § 28.432 | Some handgun sales are required to be registered to local law enforcement. There are several exceptions, including, but not limited to, police and United States citizens holding a concealed carry permit from another state. |
| Assault weapon law? | No | No | | |
| Magazine capacity restriction? | No | No | | |
| Owner license required? | No | No | | |
| Permit required for concealed carry? | N/A | Yes | MCL § 28.425b MCL § 750.227 | Michigan is a "shall issue" state for citizens and lawful permanent residents who are 21 years or older. |
| Permit required for open carry? | No | No | MCL § 750.227 | May carry openly without permit, except Concealed Pistol License required to carry in a vehicle. |
| Castle Doctrine/Stand Your Ground law? | Yes | Yes | MCL § 780.951 | |
| State preemption of local restrictions? | Yes | Yes | MCL § 123.1102 | |
| NFA weapons restricted? | No | No | | |
| Peaceable Journey laws? | Yes | Yes | MCL § 750.231a | |
| Background checks required for private sales? | Yes | Yes | MCL § 28.422a | A license to purchase a firearm (issued by a police department) or a Michigan-issued Concealed Pistol License (CPL) is required to purchase a long gun (private sales only) or a handgun (both private sales and dealer sales). Applicants must undergo a background check to receive either a license to purchase a firearm or a CPL. |
| Duty to inform? | No | Yes | MCL § 28.425f | |

== "Firearm" defined ==
The word 'firearm', except as otherwise specifically defined in statute, includes any weapon which will, is designed to, or may readily be converted to expel a projectile by action of an explosive. " Michigan's Attorney General has ruled that the definition of "firearm" includes a Taser. As of August 6, 2012, under essentially the same laws applicable to pistols in Michigan, private citizens may purchase and use Tasers.

According to the State of Michigan's Penal Code, a pistol is defined as "a loaded or unloaded firearm that is 26 inches or less in length, or a loaded or unloaded firearm that by its construction and appearance conceals itself as a firearm"; A person who knowingly sells a handgun without complying with MCL 28.422, is guilty of a misdemeanor, punishable by imprisonment for not more than 90 days, or a fine of not more than $100.00, or both; Michigan Penal Code pg. 386 Sec. 223 (1). A person 18 years of age can legally purchase a muzzle loading pistol, cannon up to 42 lbs, or long gun from a private seller. A person 18 years of age can legally purchase a handgun from a private seller, but first must obtain a purchasing permit which is good for 30 days or have valid cpl license.

== Purchasing firearms ==
At the age of 18 or up, it is legal to buy a handgun with a purchase license from a private seller, at the age of 21, it is legal to buy a firearm from a Federally licensed (FFL) dealer. No purchase license is required to purchase a long gun, or muzzle loader (a firearm that is more than 26 inches long) in Michigan. According to state law, a long gun may be purchased by anyone aged 18 or over who is not subject to restrictions based on criminal history, mental health history, or other disqualifying factor. A person must be at least 18 years old to purchase a long gun from a federal dealer or a private seller under Michigan law.

Only Michigan residents may purchase handguns, short barrelled rifles, and short barrelled shotguns in Michigan. Residents of any state may purchase long guns in Michigan and Michigan residents may purchase long guns in any state.

NON-CPL Holders Only that are buying a handgun from a private seller: An individual must apply to their local police or sheriff's department for a purchase license before obtaining a handgun from a private seller. The police authority will check the applicant's criminal history and for disqualifying factors such as whether the person has been ordered to undergo involuntary mental health treatment or is subject to a restraining order for domestic violence.

As of December 18, 2012, no purchase permit is required for purchases from a Class 1 FFL Dealer.

Purchases from a private party will require a purchase permit that can be acquired at any police or sheriff's office statewide.

A License to Purchase a handgun is valid for 30 days from a private party. The buyer and seller must both sign the license and may each keep one copy for his or her records. An individual must return to the local police department within 10 days of purchasing the pistol to return the remaining two copies of the license. Some agencies require all unused license-to-purchase forms to be returned to them for record-keeping purposes.

CPL Holders: A License to Purchase is not needed for anyone with a valid Michigan Concealed Pistol License even when buying from a private seller. Someone with a valid Michigan Concealed Pistol License must, however, complete a Handgun Sales Record when purchasing or acquiring a handgun.

Pawn shops, second hand dealers, and junk shops are not allowed to accept a handgun or pistol in pawn, and must be FFL dealers to buy & sell.

== Concealed carry ==
Michigan's concealed carry law is "shall issue," meaning that anyone 21 or older may obtain a license to carry a concealed pistol or handgun, so long as the person is not prohibited from owning a firearm, has not been found guilty of any felonies or certain misdemeanors within a time period of either 3 or 8 years dependent upon the charge, and has completed state-approved firearms training. Concealed Pistol License (CPL) holders are not required to obtain a license to purchase a handgun; however, they must fulfill the registration requirement (a sales record of the handgun acquisition). Under Michigan law, carrying a concealed pistol under a CPL constitutes implied permission for chemical testing for illegal drugs or alcohol; and it is strictly forbidden for someone with a concealed pistol license to carry a pistol or handgun while under the influence of drugs or alcohol.

On July 27, 2018, the Michigan Supreme Court upheld lower court rulings that allowed schools to ban openly carried guns by CPL holders. The majority opinion stated that while the legislature has occupied the field of firearm laws, prohibiting "a local unit of government", which includes "city, village, township, or county", from regulating firearms, such preemption does not apply to school districts because they are not expressly included in the definition of a local unit of government. While the court ruled that the rules are not field preempted, it did not rule on whether the rules are conflict preempted, leaving that question unanswered. The dissent argued that while the law allows school districts "the authority to enact policies that provide for the safety and welfare of pupils while at school" with the exception of "otherwise provided by law", state law does "otherwise provide" by generally prohibiting the possession of firearms on school property but then expressly exempting CPL holders from this prohibition, thereby permitting licensed individuals to possess firearms on school property.

State requirements for obtaining a Concealed Pistol License in the State of Michigan

1. Be at least 21 years of age

2. Be a citizen of the United States or an alien lawfully admitted into the United States

3. Be a resident of the State of Michigan for at least 6 months prior to application. An applicant is a state resident if one of the following applies. The applicant possesses a valid, lawfully obtained Michigan driver's license or state identification card. The applicant is lawfully registered to vote in Michigan. The applicant is on active duty status with the United States Armed Forces and stationed outside of Michigan, but Michigan is the home on record. The applicant is on active duty status with the United States Armed Forces and is permanently stationed in Michigan, but the home of record is another state.

4. Have successfully completed a pistol safety training course

5. Not be subject to the following. An order requiring involuntary hospitalization or alternative treatment. An order finding legal incapacitation. A finding not guilty by reason of insanity.

6. Not to be subject to a conditional bond release prohibiting the possession of a firearm

7. Not be subject to a Personal Protection Order (PPO)

8. Not be prohibited from possessing, using, transporting, selling, carrying, shipping, receiving, or distributing a firearm under MCL 750.224f

9. Have never been convicted of a felony in Michigan or elsewhere

10. Have no felony charges pending in Michigan or elsewhere

11. Have not been dishonorably-discharged from the United States Armed Forces

12. Have not been convicted of one of the following misdemeanors in the last eight years immediately-preceding the date of application: Failing to stop when involved in a personal injury accident, MCL 257.617a, Operating while intoxicated, seconded offense, MCL 257.625(9)(b), Drunk driving, commercial vehicle, MCL 257.625m(4), Reckless driving, MCL 257.626

13. Have not been convicted of one of the following misdemeanor in the three years immediately preceding the date of application: Operating under the influence, MCL 257.625, Embezzlement, MCL 750.174, Larceny MCL 750.365, Malicious destruction of stolen property, MCL 750.377a, Second degree retail fraud, MCL 750.356d

14. Have not been found guilty of any crime and has not offered a plea of not guilty of, or been acquitted of, any crime by any reason of insanity

15. Have never been subject to an order of involuntary commitment in an inpatient or outpatient setting due to a mental treatment

16. Not have a diagnosed mental illness at the time the application is made that includes an assessment that the individual presents a danger to himself or herself or to another, regardless of whether he or she is receiving treatment for that illness

17. Not be under a court order of legal incapacity in this State or elsewhere

18. Not be detrimental to the safety of his or her self or any other person

- As issued by the Michigan State Police "Concealed Pistol License Guide" RI-012 (02/2009)

A pistol is subject to immediate seizure if the CPL permit holder is carrying a concealed pistol in a "pistol-free" area. Open carry with a CPL in state defined "pistol-free" areas is legal. Please refer to Michigan AG opinion No. 7097 and Michigan State Police Legal Update #86.

An individual licensed to carry a concealed pistol who is stopped by a police officer (traffic stop or otherwise) while in possession of a concealed pistol shall immediately disclose to the police officer that he or she is carrying a concealed pistol either on their person or in their motor vehicle.

As of March 29, 2001, per Administrative Order 2001-1 of the Michigan Supreme Court, weapons are not allowed in courtrooms or related office space without prior approval.

There are few places where open carry is expressly prohibited by federal or state law. Discharging a firearm remains illegal in many cities and charter townships (and such an ordinance is not preempted by state law). In addition, there are laws regulating how firearms may be transported in motor vehicles, which must be followed. By its express terms, the criminal prohibition in section 227(2) does not apply to a person licensed to carry a pistol, provided that the pistol is carried in a manner or place consistent with any restriction upon that license. This conclusion is further supported by section 425c(2) of the Concealed Pistol Licensing Act, MCL 28.425c(2), which expressly authorizes a concealed pistol licensee to "[c]arry a pistol in a vehicle, whether concealed or not concealed, anywhere in this state." Moreover, section 231a(1)(a) of the Penal Code, MCL 750.231a(1)(a), provides that the prohibition against carrying a concealed pistol in a motor vehicle does not apply to a person holding a valid license to carry a concealed pistol, provided that the pistol is carried in conformity with any restrictions appearing on the license. A person who is not licensed to carry a concealed pistol must keep the pistol either in a box that can be locked and safely stored in the trunk out of arms reach or if however the motor vehicle does not have a trunk, the pistol must then be safely placed in a box that is specifically designed to carry a firearm in-which can be locked in present view, or with its specified holster unloaded with the pistol itself in present view and magazine separated having one or the other, or both locked in the glove compartment and or furthest in the back seat out of arms reach.

No one is allowed to bring a firearm, concealed or openly, onto the property of a correctional facility, under a law prohibiting weapons that could help prisoners escape. If someone who is carrying openly, who is not on their own private property, puts a coat on over his firearm or otherwise hides it, even temporarily, and he or she does not have a concealed pistol license, he or she has committed the felony crime of carrying a concealed weapon without a license. The Michigan Attorney General has released an opinion stating that open carry is not considered reasonable suspicion of a crime, but there are no Michigan court decisions definitively ruling on this point. In addition, the Michigan Attorney General has released an opinion that "a reserve police officer" who carries a visible, holstered pistol is neither brandishing it nor disturbing the peace. Michigan formerly did not allow ownership of NFA firearms, though the Attorney General has issued an opinion, 7183, that allows machine guns to be legally-transferred to Michigan residents who comply with federal laws. A 2011 opinion by Attorney General Bill Schuette allows the possession and transfer of suppressors in Michigan. Armor-piercing ammunition for handguns is illegal in Michigan.

Michigan does not prohibit the possession of tasers or stun guns by private citizens, they must have a concealed pistol licence to conceal carry a stun gun or taser. A stun gun or taser is treated like a pistol. No permit needed to buy.

== Open carry ==
Open carry is allowed without a permit. Carrying in a vehicle requires a permit.

On October 16, 2020, Secretary of State Jocelyn Benson issued a directive that attempted to prohibit open carry at a polling place on election day. On October 27, the Michigan Court of Claims issued a preliminary injunction invalidating the directive, thus allowing open carry. The Michigan Court of Appeals and Michigan Supreme Court both declined to overturn the injunction.

== Storage ==
Beginning in February 2024, Michigan began requiring gun-owners to keep firearms in a locked container if minors are known to be on the premises. The state began offering free locks in order to ensure gun-owners could comply with the law.

== Other laws ==
Some counties have adopted Second Amendment sanctuary resolutions.

== See also ==
- Law of Michigan
