= Gun laws in Alabama =

Location of Alabama in the United States

Gun laws in Alabama regulate the sale, possession, and use of firearms and ammunition in the state of Alabama in the United States.

== Summary table ==
Subject / law	Long guns	Handguns	Relevant statutes	Notes
State permit required to purchase?	No	No		
Firearm registration?	No	No		
Assault weapon law?	No	No		
Magazine capacity restriction?	No	No		
Owner license required?	No	No		
Permit required for concealed carry?	N/A	No	13A-11-75	Alabama is a "shall issue" state for citizens and lawful permanent residents who are 19 years or older. Permitless concealed carry for residents 18 years or older took effect on January 1, 2023.
Permit required for open carry?	No	No	13A-11-7	May carry openly without permit, except handgun must be secured in a holster.
Castle Doctrine/Stand Your Ground law?	Yes	Yes	13A-3-23	
State preemption of local restrictions?	Yes	Yes	13A-11-61.3	"...the Legislature hereby occupies and preempts the entire field of regulation in this state touching in any way upon firearms, ammunition, and firearm accessories..."
NFA weapons restricted?	No	No	13A-11-54	It is illegal to carry an Any Other Weapon (AOW) disguised as a walking cane.
Peaceable Journey laws?	No	No		
Background checks required for private sales?	No	No		

== State constitutional provisions ==
Article I, Section 26 of the Constitution of Alabama states:

"(a) Every citizen has a fundamental right to bear arms in defense of himself or herself and the state. Any restriction on this right shall be subject to strict scrutiny.

(b) No citizen shall be compelled by any international treaty or international law to take an action that prohibits, limits, or otherwise interferes with his or her fundamental right to keep and bear arms in defense of himself or herself and the state, if such treaty or law, or its adoption, violates the United States Constitution."

The Alabama Constitution was amended in 2014 through a voter approved amendment which greatly expanded the state constitutional protections for the individual right to bear arms.

== Alabama gun laws ==
The firearm preemption statute reads "The purpose of this section is to establish within the Legislature complete control over regulation and policy pertaining to firearms, ammunition, and firearm accessories in order to ensure that such regulation and policy is applied uniformly throughout this state to each person subject to the state's jurisdiction and to ensure protection of the right to keep and bear arms recognized by the Constitutions of the State of Alabama and the United States." Localities may regulate the discharge of firearms and levy taxes. On April 21, 2010, Gov. Bob Riley signed House Bill 2 into law as Act 2010-496 amending Ala. §13A-11-63, to allow civilian ownership of short-barrel rifles and short-barrel shotguns, as allowed by federal law. The only firearms known to be prohibited are those disguised as walking canes. Both open carry and concealed carry without a permit is allowed for both residents and non-residents.

Some counties have adopted Second Amendment sanctuary resolutions.

== Concealed carry licences ==
Alabama shall issue a license, unlimited, to applicants who are residents of the county in which they apply, who do not have any disqualifying criminal convictions, who are suitable persons. All Alabama county sheriffs issue licenses to all "suitable persons." The law requires applicants to be residents, therefore they do not issue licenses to non-residents. Licenses are valid for up to five years at a time. Alabama honors licenses issued by any state, provided that the license holder is not a resident of Alabama.

The following individuals are excluded from being issued a concealed carry permit:

- Any person who has been convicted of a felony (a crime punishable by imprisonment for a term exceeding one year).
- Any person who has been convicted of committing or attempting to commit a crime of violence, including murder, manslaughter (except manslaughter arising from the operation of a vehicle), rape, mayhem, assault with intent to rob, assault with intent to ravish, assault with intent to murder, robbery, distribution of a controlled substance, burglary and kidnapping.
- Any person who is an unlawful drug user, a drug addict or a habitual drunkard. Factors to consider include repeated and recent arrests or convictions for drug crimes, DUI, and/or public intoxication.
- Any person who is under indictment for a crime punishable for imprisonment exceeding one year.
- Any person who has been convicted of domestic violence, even if the conviction is a misdemeanor.
- Any person discharged from the Armed Forces under dishonorable conditions.
- Any person who has been adjudicated as a mental defective or who has been committed to a mental institution, or any person who has asserted a defense of not guilty by reason of insanity or mental defect in a criminal proceeding.
- Any person who is or has been a subject of an incompetency proceeding, the result of which may prohibit the possession of a firearm.
- Any person who, having been a citizen of the United States, has renounced his/her citizenship.
- Any person who is a fugitive from justice.
- Any person who is an alien illegally in the United States or under a non-immigrant visa.
- Any person who is subject to a court order that restrains that person from harassing, stalking, or threatening an intimate partner or child of an intimate partner.
- Any person who causes justifiable concern for public safety, according to Ala. Act. No. 2013-283.

Ex-felons that have received a state pardon from the Alabama Board of Pardons & Paroles restoring their firearm rights and have had their NCIC record updated by the FBI CJIS may apply for a pistol permit after having a thorough background check and a face-to-face meeting with the county sheriff or their designated representative.

== See also ==
- Hunting license
- Law of Alabama
