= Gun laws in Delaware =

Location of Delaware in the United States

Gun laws in Delaware regulate the sale, possession, and use of firearms and ammunition in the U.S. state of Delaware.

== Summary table ==
Subject / law	Long guns	Handguns	Relevant statutes	Notes
State permit required to purchase?	No	Yes	§ 1448A	The Permit to Purchase law takes effect on November 16, 2025, and individuals are urged to review the process ahead of that date to ensure they are prepared to meet all necessary criteria.
Firearm registration?	No	No		
Assault weapon law?	Yes	Yes	HB 450	Effective June 30, 2022, the production, sale, transfer, receipt, and possession of firearms deemed as assault weapons are prohibited. State law bans numerous specifically named semi-automatic centerfire rifles, semi-automatic shotguns, and semi-automatic pistols. The law also bans "copycat" assault weapons, which are defined as being a firearm that while not specifically listed as a banned assault weapon, is either a semi-automatic centerfire rifle, semi-automatic shotgun, or semi-automatic pistol with one or more specific banned cosmetic features.
Magazine capacity restriction?	Yes	Yes	SB 66	Effective August 29, 2022, the production, sale, purchase, receipt, transfer, and possession of magazines capable of holding more than 17 rounds is prohibited. Active and retired law enforcement officers, members of the United States Armed Forces, and concealed-carry permit holders are exempt from the ban. .22 Caliber tubular magazines are also exempt from the ban.
Owner license required?	No	No		
Permit required for concealed carry?	N/A	Yes	11 Del.C. § 1441	Delaware is de jure a "may issue" state for concealed carry, but historically and in light of the Supreme Court's decision in New York State Rifle & Pistol Association, Inc. v. Bruen, is shall-issue in practice. Permits are generally issued to all applicants not barred from owning a firearm.
Permit required for open carry?	No	No		Open carry without a permit is generally lawful. A 2014 Delaware Supreme Court ruling recognized that open carry was a long-standing fundamental right, and could only be prohibited by local ordinances in effect prior to July 4, 1985. The city of Dover formerly required a permit from the police chief for a state concealed permit to open carry, but this was repealed in October 2015 in accordance with the ruling.
Stand Your Ground	No	No		A person is allowed to defend themselves or others in their home or workplace. While deadly force is allowed, it is only to be used when all other options have been exhausted, and the person feels they are in immediate danger. However, When a person is outside their home or workplace, deadly force to defend themselves may be illegal due to the fact there is a duty to retreat before deadly force is used.
State preemption of local restrictions?	Yes*	Yes*	22 Del.C § 111	Municipalities may regulate only the discharge of firearms and the possession of firearms within police stations and municipal buildings, unless the ordinance was in effect prior to July 4, 1985.
NFA weapons restricted?	Yes	Yes		SBRs and AOWs are legal. The city of Wilmington prohibits possession of SBRs within city limits. Machine guns, suppressors, Destructive Devices and SBS are prohibited for civilians.
Peaceable Journey laws?	No	No		Federal rules observed.
Background checks required for private sales?	Yes	Yes	147th General Assembly: Chapter 20	Private party transfers of firearms to persons other than family members must be conducted through a licensed dealer, who is required by federal law to conduct a background check and keep a record of the sale. A transfer to a person who possesses a valid License to Carry a Concealed Deadly Weapon is exempt from this requirement.
Red flag law?	Yes	Yes	House Bill 302 (2018)	If a mental health professional deems that a person is a danger to themselves or to others, the police may get a court order to temporarily seize that person's firearms.

== Purchasing a firearm ==
Under a new law, Delaware requires a Permit to Purchase. This takes effect on November 16, 2025. Buyers must be at least 18 years old to purchase shotguns; muzzle-loading rifles; and deadly weapons other than firearms, and 21 years old for handguns and rifles. 18-20-year-olds who are either a member of the armed forces, are a qualified law enforcement officer, or hold a concealed-carry permit are exempt from the general ban on the purchase of handguns and rifles.

Delaware was voted the 5th easiest state to purchase a gun. There are about 5.6 registered gun owners per 1000 people in the state of Delaware, and over 1000 firearms dealers within the state. There are also gun shows that allow you to buy antique guns, and guns that are not currently being made or are rare.

=== Firearm definition ===
Delaware law classifies a "firearm" as any weapon from which a shot, projectile, or other object may be discharged by force of combustion, explosive, gas, and/or mechanical means, whether operable or inoperable, loaded or unloaded. It does not include BB guns.

==== Handguns and long guns (other than shotguns) ====
The basic requirements to purchase a handgun or a non-shotgun long-gun are as follows: Buyers must be 21 or older, possess a state-registered ID, and pass a Federal background check. 18-20-year-olds who are either a member of the armed forces, are a qualified law enforcement officer, or hold a concealed-carry permit are exempt from the general ban on the purchase of handguns and rifles.

==== Shotguns ====
The basic requirements to purchase a shotgun are as follows: Buyers must be 18 years or older, possess a state-registered ID, and pass a Federal background check.

== Restrictions and requirements ==
Individuals that are barred from possessing firearms are those who have felony convictions. This also extends to misdemeanor violent offenses, along with all convictions that include narcotics and controlled substances. Another restriction that prevents people from obtaining firearms is if you have a mental instability or a mental illness. A background check is not needed to buy antique guns.

=== Background checks ===
Delaware requires a background check for all transfers of firearms to private citizens.

§ 1448B. Criminal history record checks for sales of firearms – unlicensed persons.

(a) No unlicensed person shall sell or transfer any firearm, as defined in § 222 of this title, to any other unlicensed person without having conducted a criminal history background check through a licensed firearms dealer in accordance with § 1448A of this title and 24 Del.C. § 904A, as the same may be amended from time to time, to determine whether the sale or transfer would be in violation of federal or state law.

An adult-record check is also required. In 2016, the Delaware General Assembly passed legislation that required all gun purchasers to have a federal background check, however, if the government takes more than 3 days for the check the seller of the firearm is allowed to go forward with the sale. In the state of Delaware, people are permitted to buy a shotgun with a background check being sent to the firearm dealer. The average cost of a state background check in Delaware is $52.

=== Extreme risk protection order ===
If the patient of a mental health professional makes an explicit or imminent threat to kill or injure someone, the professional must report this to the police. If the police verify that the person is a risk to themselves or to others, they may get an order from a judge to seize the person's firearms for up to 30 days. The Delaware Department of Justice can request that this period be extended.

== Concealed carry ==
To be able to carry a concealed weapon you must first have a CCDW permit. In order to get this permit, you must publish your full name, address, and intention apply for a permit in a local newspaper, at least 10 days before filing. You must then obtain and attach an affidavit which shows that the publication was met. After that you must also submit 5 reference questionnaires completed by citizens of the county in which you reside. Lastly, you must have the application notarized. If denied for your application you are allowed to appeal. If accepted you will have 90 days to complete the approved gun course, only then will you be allowed to carry a concealed weapon. After your first three years you will need to reapply for your permit. If you are granted another permit this one will now last for five years, not three. Delaware permits are honored in 28 states. Open carry is allowed without a permit.

=== Restricted areas ===
Legal gun owners can bring their firearms almost anywhere in the state of Delaware. Gun owners are legally allowed to openly carry handguns in the state without a permit. The only places where firearms are prohibited by law are courthouses, police stations, and a few additional areas. Public parks were prohibited area until the state Supreme Court found their inclusion unconstitutional and prohibited enforcement of a carry ban on state park lands. Shortly thereafter, the Delaware Department of Natural Resources and Environmental Control and Department of Agriculture promulgated regulations to forbid carrying a firearm without a permit in several places including camping areas and lodges, exempting permit holders if they show their permits when asked without probable cause. The Superior Court found these to be unconstitutional as well.
