= Gun laws in Nebraska =

Location of Nebraska in the United States

Gun laws in Nebraska regulate the sale, possession, and use of firearms and ammunition in the state of Nebraska in the United States.

== Summary table ==
Subject / law	Long guns	Handguns	Relevant Statutes	Notes
State permit required to purchase?	No	Yes	Neb. Rev. Stat. § 69-2403	For handguns, a Firearm Purchase Permit (issued by the sheriff in the county of one's residence) or a Nebraska-issued Concealed Handgun Permit is required.
Firearm registration?	No	No		
Assault weapon law?	No	No		
Magazine capacity restriction?	No	No		
Owner license required?	No	No		
Permit required for concealed carry?	N/A	No	Neb. Rev. Stat. § 28-1202; Neb. Rev. Stat. § 69-2430	Nebraska is a "shall issue" state for citizens and lawful permanent residents who are 21 years or older. Permitless carry took effect on September 2 2023, 90 days after the end of the legislative session, which ended on June 1, 2023.
Permit required for open carry?	No	No		May carry openly without permit. For open carry in a vehicle, the firearm must be clearly visible.
Castle Doctrine/Stand Your Ground law?	No	No		
State preemption of local restrictions?	Yes	Yes	Neb. Rev. Stat. § 14-102; Neb. Rev. Stat. § 15-255; Neb. Rev. Stat. § 16-227; Neb. Rev. Stat. § 17-556; Neb. Rev. Stat. § 18-1703; Neb. Rev. Stat. § 69-2425	Localities may regulate firearm discharge.
NFA weapons restricted?	Yes	No	Neb. Rev. Stat. § 28-1203; Neb. Rev. Stat. § 28-1220	Destructive devices are banned.
Peaceable Journey laws?	No	No		
Background checks required for private sales?	No	Yes	Neb. Rev. Stat. § 69-2403	For handguns, a Firearm Purchase Permit (issued by the sheriff in the county of one's residence) or a Nebraska-issued Concealed Handgun Permit is required.
Duty to inform?	No	Yes	Neb. Rev. Stat. § 69-2440	
Purchase age restriction?	No	Yes	Neb. Rev. Stat. § 69-2404	In addition to federal law, state law prohibits sales of handguns to those under 21, including in private transactions.

== Nebraska laws ==
In Nebraska, to purchase a handgun, a permit to purchase is required. Rifles and shotguns are not subject to gun laws more restrictive than those at the federal level. As of January 1, 2007, Nebraska became the 48th state to legalize concealed carry; permits to carry are being issued by the Nebraska State Patrol. NFA firearms (machine guns, short barreled shotguns, short barreled rifles, and silencers) are legal to own as long as they are compliant with federal law. Open carry is allowed without a permit. On September 2nd, 2023, state preemption and constitutional carry take effect, invalidating local open carry restrictions and allowing concealed carry without a permit.

Residents of the city of Omaha were required to register their handguns, unless that resident possessed a State of Nebraska Concealed Handgun Permit. This ended September 2nd 2023, with the enactment of full firearm preemption.

In Lincoln, municipal code section 9.36.100 prohibits the possession of a firearm by anyone who has been convicted of certain misdemeanors within the last ten years. These include stalking, violation of an order of protection, impersonating a police officer, and public indecency. The Lancaster County Sheriff will not issue a Nebraska permit to purchase a handgun if the applicant is a Lincoln resident and is prohibited by this law from possessing firearms.

Some counties have adopted Second Amendment sanctuary resolutions.

== See also ==
- Law of Nebraska
