= Open carry in the United States =

Practice of carrying a visible firearm in some US states

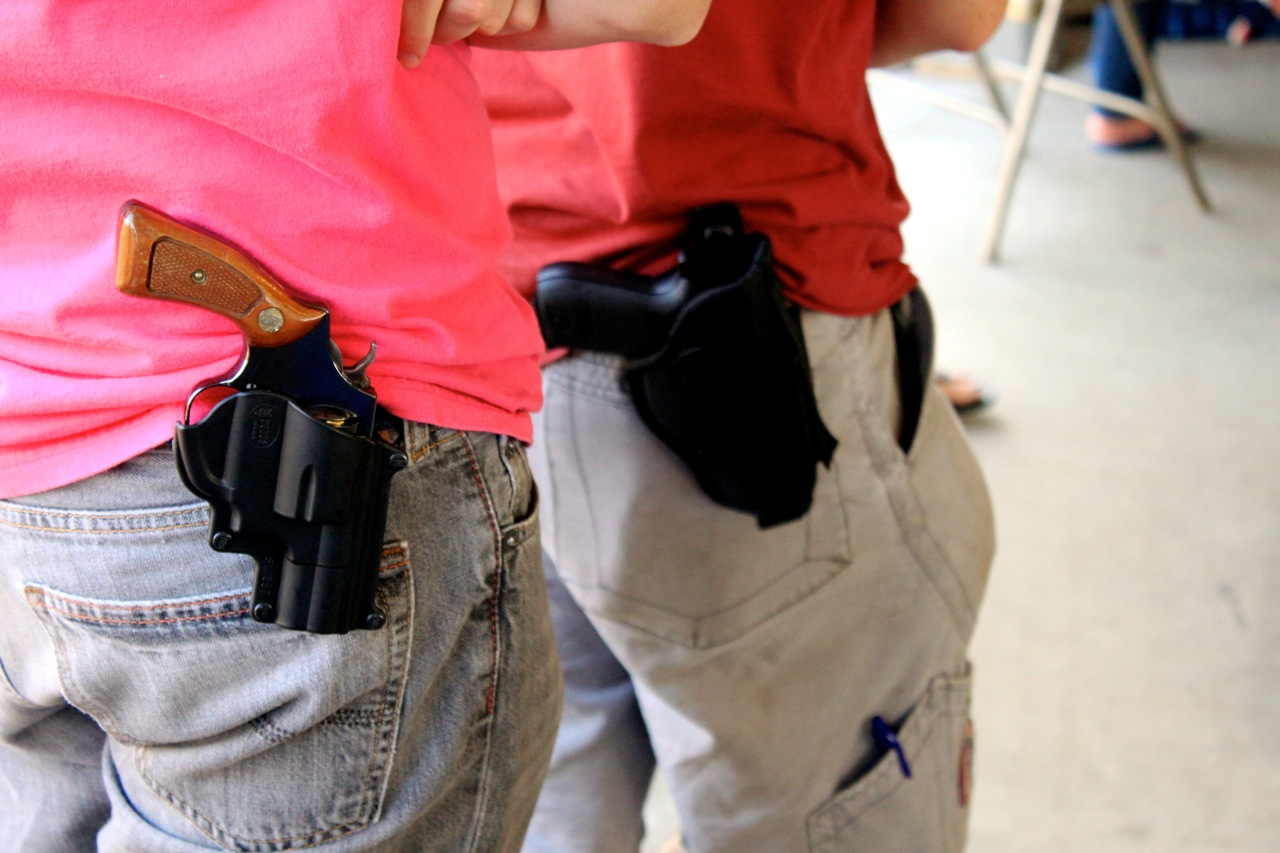
Two persons openly carrying handguns in New Hampshire

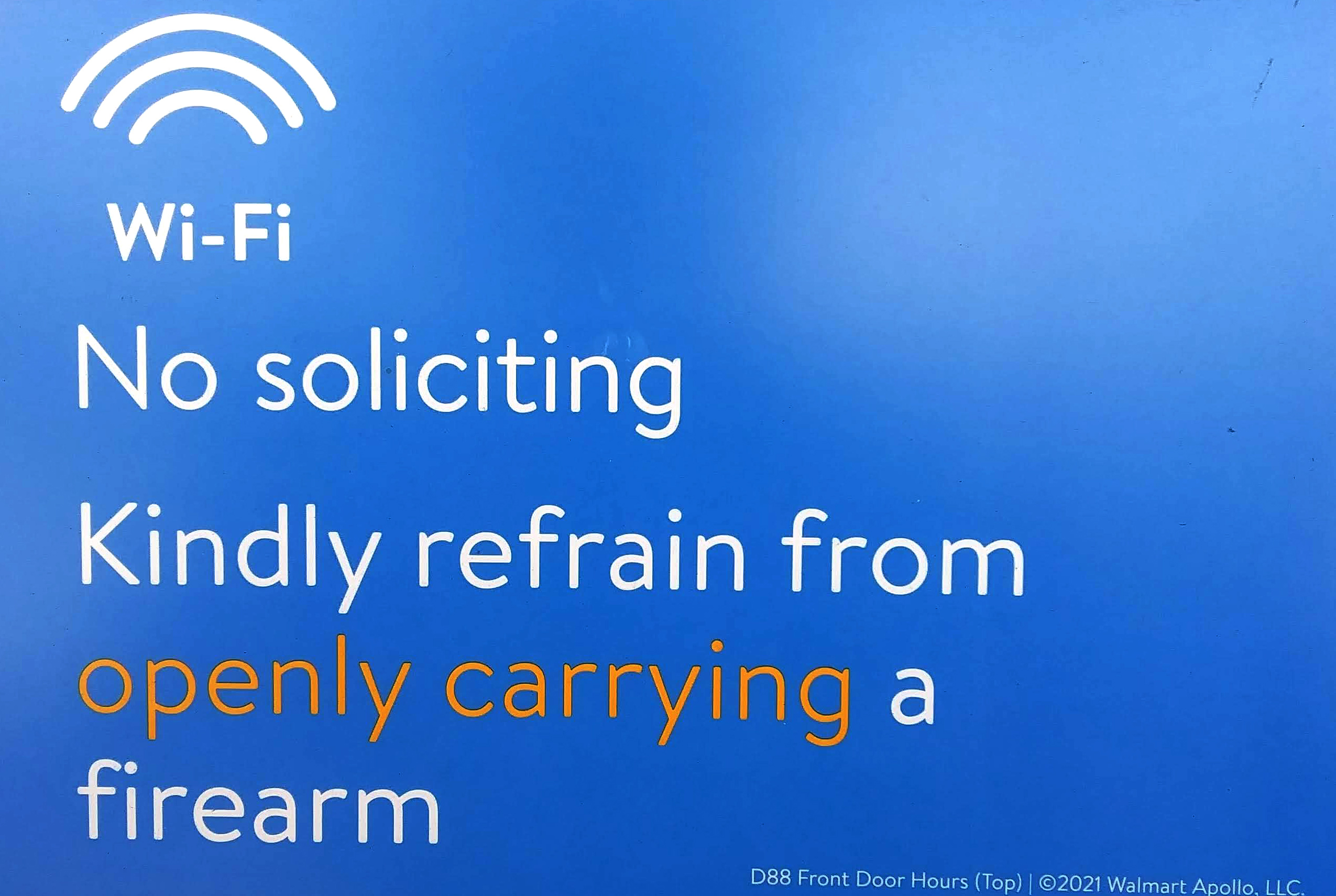
Sign at a Walmart entrance asking patrons not to open carry

In the United States, open carry is the practice of visibly carrying a firearm in public places, as distinguished from concealed carry, where firearms cannot be seen by the casual observer. To "carry" in this context indicates that the firearm is kept readily accessible on the person, within a holster or attached to a sling. Carrying a firearm directly in the hands, particularly in a firing position or combat stance, is known as "brandishing" and may constitute a serious crime, but is not the mode of "carrying" discussed in this article.

The practice of open carry, where gun owners openly carry firearms while they go about their daily business, has seen an increase in the United States in recent years, and is a hotly debated topic in gun politics. This has been marked by a number of organized events intended to increase the visibility of open carry and public awareness about the practice. Proponents of open carry point to history and statistics, noting that criminals usually conceal their weapons, in contrast to the law-abiding citizens who display their weapons. As of 2025, almost all US states allow for open carry either without a permit or with a permit/license.

The gun rights community has become supportive of the practice, while gun control groups are generally opposed.

== Terminology ==
Open carry
The act of publicly carrying a firearm on one's person in plain sight.
Plain sight
Broadly defined as not being hidden from common observation; varies somewhat from state to state. Some states specify that open carry occurs when the weapon is "partially visible", while other jurisdictions require the weapon to be "fully visible" to be considered as carried openly.
Loaded weapon
Definition varies from state to state. Depending on state law, a weapon may be considered "loaded" under one of the following criteria:
- Only when a live round of ammunition is in the firing chamber of the weapon
- When a magazine with ammunition is inserted into the firearm, regardless of whether or not a round is in the chamber
- When a person has both the firearm and its ammunition in their possession (or readily accessible, in some instances), without regard as to whether a round is in the chamber or a magazine with ammunition is inserted into the firearm (most common legal definition in "gun-control" states).
Preemption
In the context of open carry: the act of a state legislature passing laws which limit or eliminate the ability of local governments to regulate the possession or carrying of firearms.
Prohibited persons
This refers to people who are prohibited by law from carrying a firearm. Typical examples are felons, those convicted of a misdemeanor of domestic violence, those found to be addicted to alcohol or drugs, those who have been involuntarily committed to a mental institution, and those who have been dishonorably discharged from the United States Armed Forces.

=== Categories of law ===
In the United States, the laws vary from state to state regarding open carry of firearms. The categories are defined as follows:

Permissive open carry states
A state has passed full preemption of all firearms laws, with few exceptions. They allow open carry for all nonprohibited citizens and do not require a permit or license to carry firearms openly. Open carry is fully lawful on foot. A permit may or may not be required to carry in a motor vehicle, depending on the state.
Permissive open carry with local restriction states
A state that generally allows open carry without a license, but additional restrictions may exist on non-license holders such as local restrictions or additional restricted locations or modes of carry. Some states exempt license holders from local restrictions while others don't.
Licensed open carry states
A state has passed full preemption of all firearms laws, with few exceptions. They allow open carry for all nonprohibited citizens who have been issued a permit or license. Open carry of a handgun is lawful on foot and in a motor vehicle. In practice, however, some of these states that have may-issue licensing laws can be regarded as non-permissive for open carry, as issuing authorities rarely or never grant licenses to ordinary citizens.
Anomalous open carry states
Open carry is generally prohibited except either under special circumstances or in unincorporated areas of counties in which population densities are below statutorily defined thresholds, and local authorities have enacted legislation to allow open carry with a permit in such jurisdictions, as in California, for example. Thus, some local jurisdictions may permit open carry, and others may impose varying degrees of restrictions or prohibit open carry entirely.
Non-permissive open carry states
Open carry of a handgun is not lawful or is lawful only under such a limited set of circumstances that public carry is effectively prohibited. They may include when one is hunting or traveling to/from hunting locations, on property controlled by the person carrying, or for lawful self-defense. Additionally, some states with may-issue licensing laws are non-permissive when issuing authorities are highly restrictive in the issuance of licenses allowing open carry.

== Jurisdictions in the United States ==
Open carry of handguns in the United States

Open carry of long guns in the United States

Legal with no permit/license required
Legal with no permit/license required; possible local restrictions
Legal with permit/license
Anomalous
Illegal

In the United States, the laws concerning open carry vary by state and sometimes by municipality. The following chart lists state policies for openly carrying a loaded handgun in public.

Status of open carry, by jurisdiction
Jurisdiction	Handguns	Long guns	Notes
Alabama	Permitless		Open carry without permit allowed. Local restrictions preempted.
Alaska	Permitless		Open carry without permit allowed.
American Samoa	Handguns illegal	Under license	Open carry legal for holders of a valid License to Possess which are required to purchase and possess firearms; though Licenses to Possess have been restricted to only shotguns and rimfire rifles since 1991, effectively banning handguns. Licenses issued for handguns and other firearms prior to 1991 are grandfathered as long as they remain valid.
Arizona	Permitless		Open carry without permit allowed. State law does not preempt tribal laws on Native American reservations, except when traversing a reservation on a state-owned highway. Some tribes do not permit open carry, while some others may require a tribal permit for open carry.
Arkansas	Permitless		The legal status of open carry without a license was considered a gray area from 2013 until 2015, when an Attorney General opinion was issued stating open carry was indeed legal. Despite this there were still questions over the law until 2017, when Governor Asa Hutchinson sent an order to the Arkansas State Police stating open carry was legal. Before 2013, it was unlawful to open carry a handgun in Arkansas even with a concealed carry license. Open carry without a permit allowed, restrictions fully preempted.
California	Illegal (except some counties with permit)		Open carry legal in rural counties with local ordinances allowing open carry. Some of these counties issue a permit for open carry. Additionally, a person may also open carry if he or she "reasonably believes that any person or the property of any person is in immediate, grave danger and that the carrying of the weapon is necessary for the preservation of that person or property." One can expect to be detained and questioned by law enforcement in most urban areas if using the latter rationale as the basis for openly carrying a firearm in public.
Colorado	Permitless (with local restrictions)		Open carry without a license permitted statewide, except in the City and County of Denver where open carry is completely prohibited. Other cities and towns may have varying degrees of restriction on open carry.
Connecticut	Illegal		Effective October 1, 2023, the open carry of handguns and long guns is generally prohibited in Connecticut, except on property owned or lawfully controlled by the person carrying openly, on another's private property with permission or invitation from the owner, at a designated shooting range, or while hunting.
Delaware	Permitless		Open carry without permit allowed. Local restrictions preempted. In the city of Dover, the "grandfathered" city ordinance restricting open carry that predated state preemption was repealed in 2015.
District of Columbia	Illegal		Open carry prohibited. Open carry was briefly legal from July 27, 2015 to July 29, 2015 due to a court ruling.
Florida	Permitless		State open carry ban was declared unconstitutional by Florida First District Court of Appeal on 10 September 2025. Florida Governor Ron DeSantis and Attorney General James Uthmeier welcomed the ruling and ordered law enforcement officers to no longer enforce the ban, effectively making Florida an open carry state. Open carry is now allowed without a permit, with full preemption.
Georgia	Permitless		Open carry without permit allowed. Local restrictions preempted.
Guam	Under license		Open Carry allowed with FOID.
Hawaii	With license	Illegal	Open carry of handguns allowed with permit; permits issued on a may-issue basis but in practice are no-issue. Permits only valid in county of issuance. Local restrictions preempted. Open carry of long guns prohibited.
Idaho	Permitless		Open carry without permit allowed. Local restrictions preempted.
Illinois	Illegal		Open carry theoretically legal in unincorporated rural areas, where permitted by local ordinance. However, per Attorney General opinion open carry is prohibited.
Indiana	Permitless		Open carry of handguns allowed without a permit; permits granted on a shall-issue basis. Local restrictions preempted. No permit required to carry long guns.
Iowa	Permitless		Open carry without permit allowed. Local restrictions preempted.
Kansas	Permitless		Open carry without permit allowed. Local restrictions preempted.
Kentucky	Permitless		Open carry without permit allowed. Local restrictions preempted.
Louisiana	Permitless		Open carry without permit allowed. Local restrictions preempted.
Maine	Permitless		Open carry without permit allowed. Local restrictions preempted.
Maryland	Illegal	Permitless	Open carry of handguns is no longer permitted; permits were issued on a may-issue basis but in practice were No-Issue. Now carry permits are issued on a shall-issue basis. Open carry of long guns allowed without permit. Local restrictions preempted.
Massachusetts	Under license		Open carry allowed with Massachusetts Unrestricted License to Carry; permits were issued by local authorities on a may-issue basis. Currently, carry permits are issued on a shall-issue basis. Local restrictions preempted.
Michigan	Permitless		Open carry allowed without permit. Permit required if carrying in vehicle; permits issued on a shall-issue basis. Local restrictions preempted. More details State law says: "A local unit of government shall not impose special taxation on, enact or enforce any ordinance or regulation pertaining to, or regulate in any other manner the ownership, registration, purchase, sale, transfer, transportation, or possession of pistols or other firearms, ammunition for pistols or other firearms, or components of pistols or other firearms, except as otherwise provided by federal law or a law of this state."
Minnesota	Under license		Open carry allowed with permit; permits issued on a shall-issue basis. Local restrictions preempted.
Mississippi	Permitless		Open carry of handguns allowed without permit; permits issued on a shall-issue basis. No permit required to carry a long gun. Local restrictions preempted.
Missouri	Permitless (localities may require permit)		Open carry without permit allowed. However, several cities and counties restrict open carry, in which case one must either: 1. have a carry permit, thus exempting them from local restrictions on open carry, or 2. carry concealed, which is allowed without a permit and localities are preempted.
Montana	Permitless		Open carry without permit allowed. Local restrictions preempted.
Nebraska	Permitless		Open carry allowed without permit. Local restrictions preempted.
Nevada	Permitless		Open carry without permit allowed. Local restrictions preempted. Carrying loaded long guns in a vehicle prohibited.
New Hampshire	Permitless		Open carry without permit allowed. Local restrictions preempted.
New Jersey	Illegal	Under license	Open carry of a handgun is no longer allowed even with a Permit to Carry a Handgun. Authorities must issue a permit if the applicant meets the minimum requirements. Open carry of unloaded long guns is legal with a Firearm Purchaser Identification Card.
New Mexico	Permitless		Open carry allowed without permit. State law does not preempt tribal laws on Native American reservations, except when traversing a reservation on a state-owned highway. Some tribes do not permit open carry, while some others may require a tribal permit for open carry.
New York	Illegal	Permitless (local bans)	Open carry of pistols and loaded long guns prohibited. Open carry of unloaded long guns allowed without permit except in New York City.
North Carolina	Permitless		Open carry allowed without permit. Local restrictions preempted.
North Dakota	Permitless		Open carry without a permit is allowed while one is in possession of valid identification. Local restrictions preempted.
Northern Mariana Islands	Permitless	Illegal	Open carry and ownership of handguns prohibited by law but the prohibition was declared unconstitutional and is not enforced so open carry of a loaded handgun is allowed without permit.
Ohio	Permitless		Open carry without permit allowed. Local restrictions preempted.
Oklahoma	Permitless		Open carry allowed without permit. Open carry of a handgun in a vehicle without permit allowed. Residents of states that do not require permits for concealed carry may openly carry with a valid ID proving residence. Local restrictions preempted.
Oregon	Permitless (localities may require permit)		Open carry without permit allowed. However, several cities and one county restrict open carry of loaded firearms. Restrictions on carrying unloaded firearms preempted. Persons with an Oregon Concealed Handgun License exempt from local restrictions.
Pennsylvania	Permitless		Open carry without permit allowed. Permit required if carrying a loaded firearm in a vehicle. Permit no longer required if carrying in Philadelphia. All other local restrictions preempted. More details Though the statute prohibiting unlicensed open carry which was declared unconstitutional in Philadelphia is specifically titled "Carrying firearms on public streets or public property in Philadelphia.", the law itself states: "No person shall carry a firearm [...] in a city of the first class[...]". In Pennsylvania, a city of the first class is defined as having a population in excess of one million, which only Philadelphia does.
Puerto Rico	Illegal		
Rhode Island	Under license	Permitless	Open carry of handguns expressly allowed with a Rhode Island Attorney General's Office Pistol Permit; Issued on a may-issue basis. No permit required to carry unloaded long guns. Local restrictions preempted.
South Carolina	Permitless		Open carry allowed without permit. Local restrictions preempted.
South Dakota	Permitless		Open carry allowed without a permit. Local restrictions preempted.
Tennessee	Permitless	Illegal	Open carry of handguns allowed without a permit. Open carry of long guns prohibited, except while hunting. Local restrictions preempted.
Texas	Permitless		Open carry of handguns allowed without a permit as long as it is in any kind of holster. Open carry of long guns allowed without a permit. Local restrictions preempted.
U.S. Virgin Islands	Illegal		Open carry is prohibited.
Utah	Permitless		No permit is required for anyone 21+ years old who may legally possess a firearm. Prior, a permit was required to open carry a chambered firearm. Open carry of an unchambered handgun allowed without permit. No permit required in a vehicle for loaded handguns or unloaded long guns. Loaded long guns in vehicles are prohibited. No permit required to open carry unchambered long guns.
Vermont	Permitless		Requiring any type of gun permit to carry is prohibited by state constitution.
Virginia	Permitless		Open carry allowed without a permit. Local restrictions generally preempted but allowed on carrying assault weapons. Persons with a concealed carry permit are exempt from local restrictions. More details The definition of an Assault Weapon under Virginia law is a non-rimfire firearm equipped with one of the following: a threaded barrel; a folding stock; or a magazine with a capacity greater than 20 rounds; or a shotgun equipped with a magazine with a capacity greater than 7 shells.
Washington	Permitless		Open carry without permit allowed and local restrictions preempted; permit required if carrying a loaded handgun in vehicle. Carrying loaded long guns in a vehicle prohibited. Exceptions on carrying firearms apply, such as coming from or going to a lawful outdoor recreational activity. Openly carried pistol may be fully loaded. Local restrictions preempted. Open carry is prohibited on the Washington State Capitol campus.
West Virginia	Permitless		Open carry without permit allowed. Local restrictions preempted.
Wisconsin	Permitless		Open carry allowed without a permit. Permit required if carrying a loaded handgun in vehicle. Local restrictions preempted. Section 32 of 2011 Wisconsin Act 35 (codified as Wis. Stat. 167.31(2)(b)), purportedly removed the vehicle carry restriction for handguns. However, the Wisconsin Supreme Court ruled that a license is required to have a loaded handgun within reach in a vehicle, because being "within reach" constitutes carrying as per the Concealed Carry Act, regardless of the Safe Transport Statute removing restrictions on transporting loaded handguns.
Wyoming	Permitless		Open carry without permit allowed. Local restrictions preempted.

== Constitutional implications ==
Open carry has never been authoritatively addressed by the United States Supreme Court. The most obvious predicate for a federal right to do so would arise under the Second Amendment to the United States Constitution.

In the majority opinion in the case of District of Columbia v. Heller (2008), Justice Antonin Scalia wrote concerning the entirety of the elements of the Second Amendment: "We find that they guarantee the individual right to possess and carry weapons in case of confrontation." However, Scalia continued: "Like most rights, the Second Amendment right is not unlimited. It is not a right to keep and carry any weapon whatsoever in any manner whatsoever and for whatever purpose."

Forty-five state constitutions recognize and secure the right to keep and bear arms in some form, and none of those prohibit the open carrying of firearms. Five state constitutions provide that the state legislature may regulate the manner of keeping or bearing arms, and advocates argue that none rule out open carry specifically. Nine state constitutions indicate that the concealed carrying of firearms may be regulated and/or prohibited by the state legislature. Open carry advocates argue that, by exclusion, open carrying of arms may not be legislatively controlled in these states.

Section 1.7 of the Kentucky State Constitution empowers the state to enact laws prohibiting "concealed carry", but open carry without a permit is a specifically protected right that may not be questioned, as decided on Holland v. Kentucky (1956): "We observe, via obiter dicta, that although a person is granted the right to carry a weapon openly, a severe penalty is imposed for carrying it concealed. If the gun is worn outside the jacket or shirt in full view, no one may question the wearer's right so to do."

The North Carolina Supreme Court ruled in North Carolina v. Kerner (1921) that requiring any form of permit, fee, or license to openly carry a firearm off one's own premises is unconstitutional according to Article 1, Section 30 of the state constitution, which declares: "A well regulated militia being necessary to the security of a free State, the right of the people to keep and bear arms shall not be infringed." The court ruled, however, that concealed carry was not a right protected by the state's constitution and thus could be regulated by law.

In July 2018, a divided panel of the United States Court of Appeals for the Ninth Circuit found that Hawaii's licensing requirement for open carry violated the Second Amendment. That ruling was vacated on February 8, 2019, and the case is scheduled to be heard en banc.

=== Grounds for detention ===
Several courts have ruled that the mere carriage of a firearm, where it is allowable by law, is not reasonable suspicion to detain someone; however, some courts have ruled that simply being armed is grounds for seizure (citation needed).

==== United States Supreme Court ====
In Terry v. Ohio (1968), the Supreme Court ruled that police may stop a person only if they have a reasonable suspicion that the person has committed or is about to commit a crime, and they may frisk the suspect for weapons if they have reasonable suspicion that the suspect is armed and dangerous. In an analogous case, the Supreme Court ruled in Delaware v. Prouse (1979) that stopping an automobile for no reason other than to check the driver's license and registration violates the Fourth Amendment. In the case Florida v. J. L. (2000), the court ruled that a police officer may not legally stop and frisk anyone based solely on an anonymous tip that simply describes that person's location and appearance without information as to any illegal conduct that the person might be planning.

==== Other federal courts ====
Unless otherwise stated, the following courts ruled that carrying a firearm is not reasonable suspicion to detain someone or being armed is not a justifiable reason to frisk someone:

The Third Circuit issued its ruling in United States v. Ubiles (2000), United States v. Navedo (2012), and United States v. Lewis (2012).

The Fourth Circuit issued its ruling in United States v. Black (2013); however, the decision in United States v. Robinson (2017) found that a suspect stopped for a lawful reason can be frisked if the officer reasonably suspects them to be armed, regardless of whether in legal possession or not.

The Sixth Circuit issued its ruling in Northrup v. City of Toledo Police Department (2015).

The Seventh Circuit issued its ruling in United States v. Leo (2015).

The Ninth Circuit issued its ruling in United States v. Brown (2019); however, the decision in United States v. Orman (2007) held that a police officer seizing a firearm for safety did not violate the Fourth Amendment.

The Tenth Circuit issued its ruling in United States v. King (1993) and United States v. Roch (1993); however, the decision in United States v. Rodriguez (2013) found that the presence of a handgun in a waistband is grounds for reasonable suspicion of unlawful carry of a deadly weapon, thus justifying a stop and frisk.

The Eleventh Circuit issued its ruling in United States v. Olson Joseph (2026).

The District Court of New Mexico issued its ruling in St. John v. McColley (2009).

==== State courts ====
Unless otherwise stated, the following courts ruled that carrying a firearm is not reasonable suspicion to detain someone or being armed is not a justifiable reason to frisk someone:

The Arizona Supreme Court issued its ruling in State v. Serna (2014).

The Florida Fourth District Court of Appeal issued its ruling in Regalado v. State (2009).

The Idaho Supreme Court issued its ruling in State v. Bishop (2009).

The Illinois Supreme Court issued its ruling in People v. Granados (2002); however, the decision in People v. Colyar (2013) found that the presence of a bullet justified officers' search for weapons on grounds of officer safety.

The Indiana Supreme Court issued its ruling in Pinner v. Indiana (2017).

The Kentucky Court of Appeals issued its ruling in Pulley v. Commonwealth (2016).

The New Jersey Superior Court, Appellate Division issued its ruling in State v. Goree (2000).

The New Mexico Supreme Court issued its ruling in State v. Vandenberg and Swanson (2003) holding that frisking for weapons was reasonable.

The Pennsylvania Supreme Court issued its ruling in Commonwealth v. Hawkins (1997) and Commonwealth v. Hicks (2019).

The Tennessee Supreme Court issued its ruling in State v. Williamson (2012).

== Demonstrations and events ==
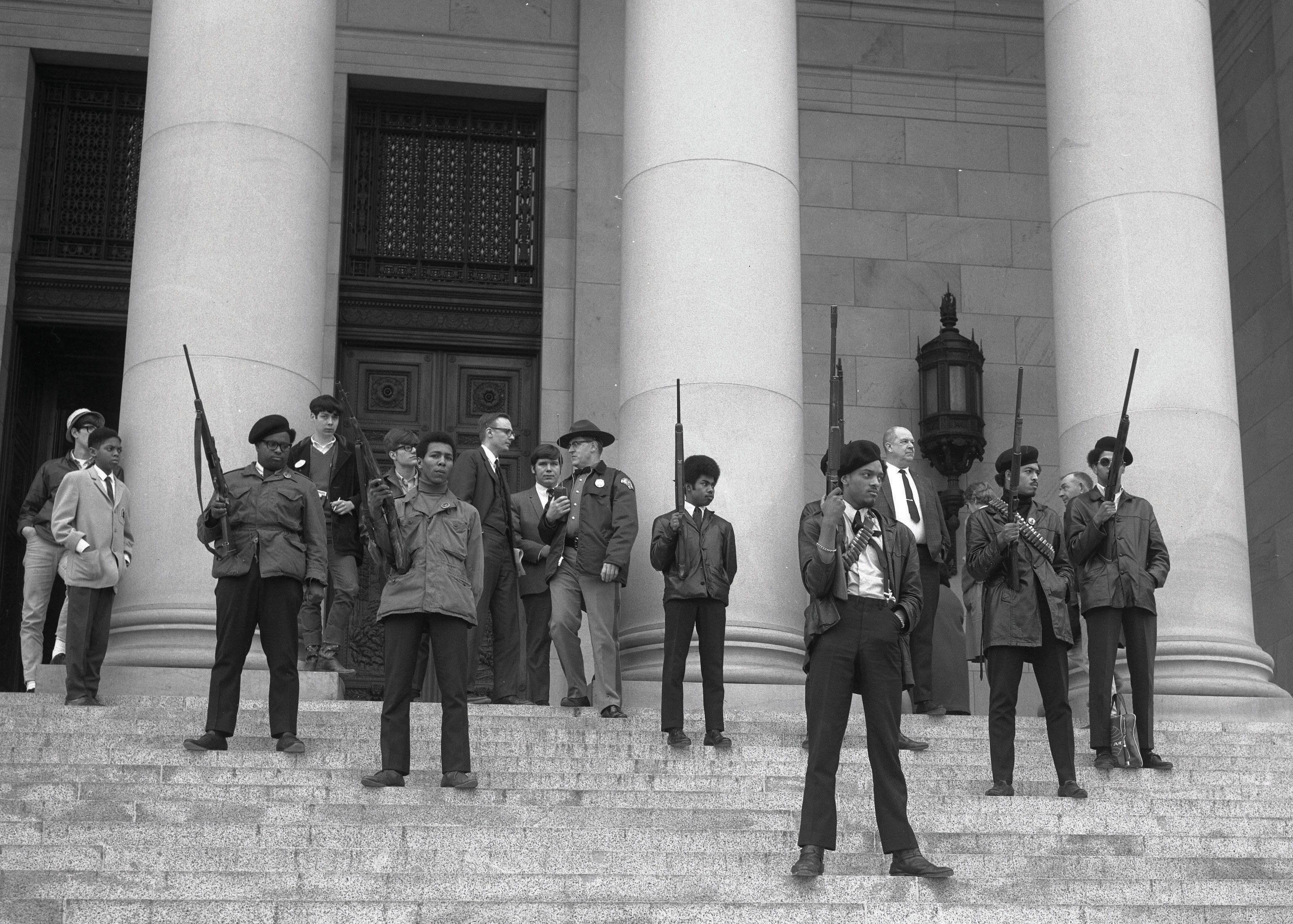
Black Panther Party members openly carrying firearms at the Washington State Capitol

- On May 2, 1967, openly armed members of the Black Panther Party marched on the California State Capitol in opposition to the then-proposed Mulford Act prohibiting the public carrying of loaded firearms. After the march in the state capitol building, the law was quickly enacted.
- On June 16, 2000, the New Black Panther Party along with the National Black United Front and the New Black Muslim Movement protested against the death sentencing conviction of Gary Graham, by openly carrying shotguns and rifles at the Texas Republican Convention in Houston, Texas.
- In 2003, gun rights supporters in Ohio used a succession of open carry "Defense Walks" attempting to persuade the governor to sign concealed carry legislation into law.
- In 2004, the legality of open carry of certain firearms in Virginia was reaffirmed after several incidents in which citizens openly carrying firearms were confronted by local law enforcement. The Virginia law prohibits the open carry, in certain localities, of any semiautomatic weapon holding more than 20 rounds or a shotgun that holds more than seven rounds, without a concealed carry permit.
- In 2008, Zachary Mead was detained in Richmond County, Georgia by law enforcement for openly carrying a firearm. The weapon was seized. The organization GeorgiaCarry.org filed a lawsuit on behalf of Mead. The court declared that the seizure was a violation of the Fourth Amendment to the United States Constitution, awarded court costs and attorney fees to Mead, and dismissed the remaining charges with prejudice (no possibility of a retrial).
- On April 20, 2009, Wisconsin Attorney General J.B. Van Hollen issued a memorandum to district attorneys stating that open carry was legal and in and of itself does not warrant a charge of disorderly conduct. Milwaukee police chief Ed Flynn instructed his officers to take down anyone with a firearm, take the gun away, and then verify if the individual could legally carry it and the safety of the situation.
- On May 31, 2009, Washington OpenCarry members held an open carry protest picnic at Silverdale's Waterfront Park, a county park. Attendees openly carried handguns in violation of posted regulations prohibiting firearms at the park. Washington state law allows the open carrying of firearms and specifically preempts local ordinances more restrictive than the state's, such as the one on the books for Kitsap County. Shortly after the protest Kitsap County commissioners voted to amend KCC10.12.080 to remove the language that banned firearms being carried in county parks. KCC10.12.080 Was amended on July 27, 2009 and as of May 31, 2012 most of the signs in the county still read that firearms are prohibited despite numerous attempts to get the county to update the signs. The amendment is listed as it reads in meeting minutes from July 2009:
  KCC10.12.080 Amendment: It is unlawful to shoot, fire or explode any firearm, firecracker, fireworks, torpedo or explosive of any kind ~~or to carry any firearm~~ or to shoot or fire any air gun, BB gun, bow and arrow or use any slingshot in any park, except the park director may authorize archery, slinging, fireworks and firing of small bore arms at designated times and places suitable for their use.
- In July 2009, an open carry event organized by OpenCarry.org took place at Pacific Beach, San Diego, California, where citizens carrying unloaded pistols and revolvers were subjected to Section 12031(e) inspections of their firearms on demand by police officers. The officers were obviously well-briefed on the details of the law, which allowed Californians to openly carry only unloaded guns and allows carry of loaded magazines and speedloaders.
- The Starbucks coffee chain has been the target of several boycotts arranged by gun control groups to protest Starbucks' policy of allowing concealed and open carry weapons in stores, if allowed by local laws. A counter buycott was proposed for Valentine's Day of 2012 to show support from gun owners for Starbucks, with the use of two-dollar bills to represent Second Amendment rights. On September 17, 2013 Howard Schultz, the CEO of Starbucks, published a letter asking customers to refrain from bringing guns into his stores.
- On February 5, 2017, two self-admitted open carry political activists, James Craig Baker and Brandon Vreeland, walked into a Dearborn, Michigan police station in order to protest what they felt was unfair profiling from an earlier traffic stop which had resulted from a 911 call after Baker had been seen near local businesses armed and dressed in tactical gear. When Baker entered the police station he was carrying an assault rifle at the "low ready" position, meaning it could be raised and fired at a moment's notice, with a fully loaded and inserted magazine. Baker was also wearing tactical gear and a ski mask. Vreeland was not armed, but was wearing body armor and carrying a camera on a tripod. The police on duty in the station immediately sounded an alarm that there was a possible active shooter in the lobby and the two activists were approached from all sides by police with guns drawn. Baker was ordered to set down his rifle and get on the floor, which he did so after a few minor protests. Vreeland, however, angrily confronted the police, stating he was not armed and only had a camera. He refused to comply with officer instructions and was tackled after several warnings to which he replied "fuck you". The two men were arrested and initially charged with misdemeanor crimes, including brandishing a weapon and disturbing the peace. These charges were later upgraded to felonies in court, partially due to a post-investigation which revealed e-mails and text messages between the two men in which they discussed deliberately provoking police, staging incidents to incite lethal force situations, as well as discussing how to elude capture should police attempt to arrest them. Vreeland was eventually convicted on one count of carrying a concealed weapon, one count of felony resisting and opposing an officer, and one count of disturbing the peace. Baker was convicted on a single count of carrying a concealed weapon. Vreeland received a prison sentence of nine months to five years, and began serving his sentence at the Charles Egeler Reception and Guidance Center in the fall of 2017. Baker received time in county jail and three years probation.
- On September 1, 2017 the state of Texas legalized the open carrying of blades longer than 5.5 inches in public.

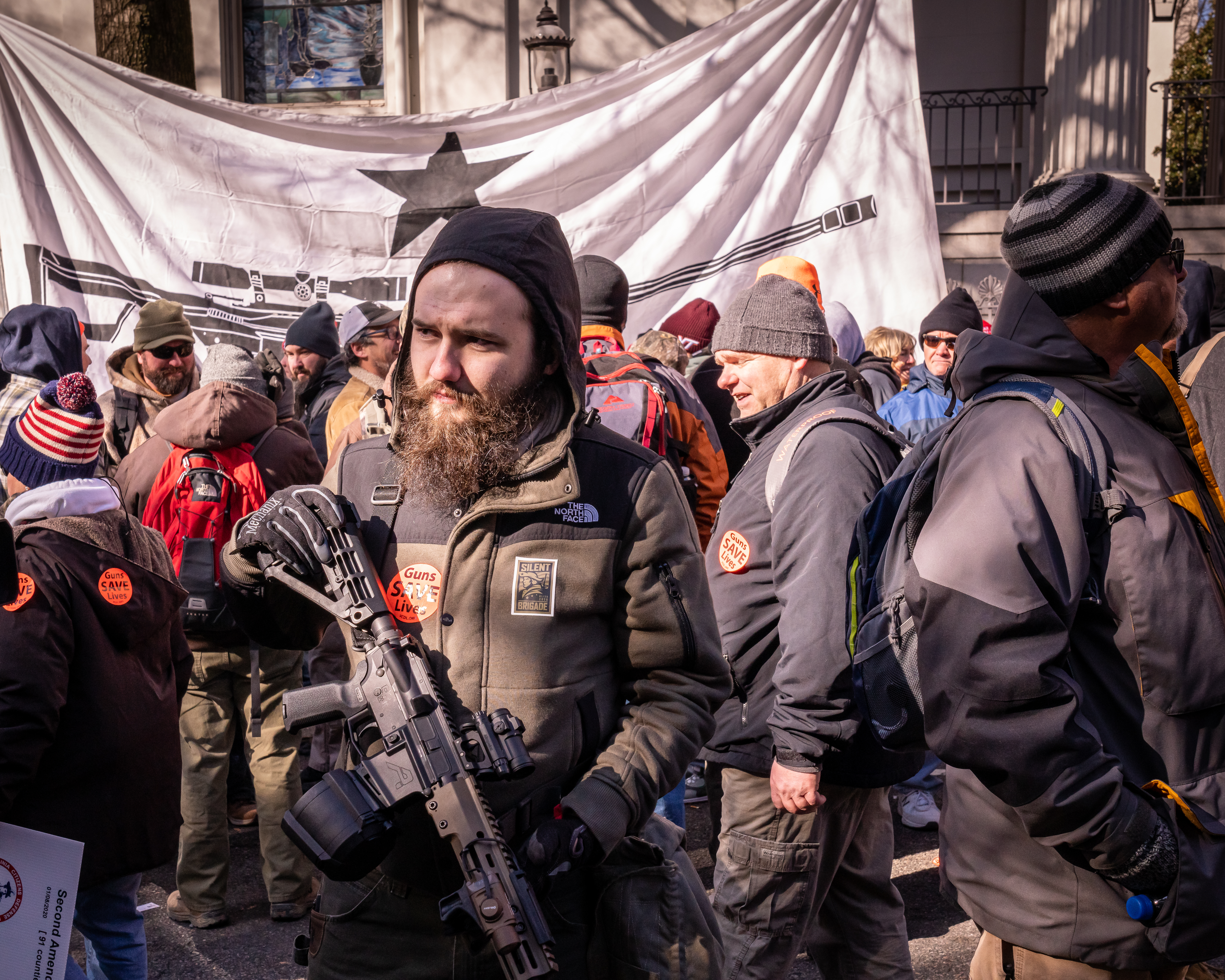
Demonstrators at the 2020 VCDL Lobby Day gun rights rally in Virginia on January 20, 2020

- On April 30, 2020, in the midst of the COVID-19 pandemic, hundreds of protesters—many of them carrying guns—descended on the Michigan Capitol to oppose Gov. Gretchen Whitmer's imminent two-week extension of the state's stay-at-home order. Protesters had demonstrated against stay-at-home orders at capitols in dozens of states, but the protests in Michigan were the most significant to occur, with protesters entering the capitol while the legislature was in session and bringing their weapons with them. The protesters' actions were legal, not only in regard to open-carrying, but to carrying in the Michigan Capitol, as no rule existed to prohibit it.

== Diversity in state laws ==
U.S. gun sales have risen in the 21st century, peaking during the COVID-19 pandemic. "NICS" is the FBI's National Instant Background Check System (NICS).

As of 2018, 45 states allowed open carry, but the details vary widely.

Four states, the U.S. Virgin Islands and the District of Columbia fully prohibit the open carry of handguns. Twenty-five states permit open carry of a handgun without requiring the citizen to apply for any permit or license. Fifteen states require some form of permit (often the same permit as allows a person to carry concealed), and the remaining five states, though not prohibiting the practice in general, do not preempt local laws or law enforcement policies, and/or have significant restrictions on the practice, such as prohibiting it within the boundaries of an incorporated urban area. Illinois allows open carry on private property only.

On October 11, 2011, California Governor Jerry Brown signed a law decreeing that it would be a "misdemeanor to openly carry an exposed and unloaded handgun in public or in a vehicle." This does not apply to the open carrying of rifles or long guns or to persons in rural areas where permitted by local ordinance.

On November 1, 2011, Wisconsin explicitly acknowledged the legality of open carry by amending its disorderly conduct statute (Wis. Stat. 947.01). A new subsection 2 states: "Unless other facts and circumstances that indicate a criminal or malicious intent on the part of the person apply, a person is not in violation of, and may not be charged with a violation of, this section for loading, carrying, or going armed with a firearm, without regard to whether the firearm is loaded or is concealed or openly carried."

On May 15, 2012, Oklahoma Governor Mary Fallin signed Senate Bill 1733, an amendment to the Oklahoma Self Defense Act, which will allow people with Oklahoma concealed weapons permits to open carry if they so choose. The law took effect November 1, 2012. "Under the measure, businesses may continue to prohibit firearms to be carried on their premises. SB 1733 prohibits carrying firearms on properties owned or leased by the city, state or federal government, at corrections facilities, in schools or college campuses, liquor stores and at sports arenas during sporting events."

== Federal Gun Free School Zones Act ==
The Federal Gun-Free School Zones Act of 1990 limits where a person may legally carry a firearm by generally prohibiting carry within one thousand feet of the property line of any K–12 school in the nation, with private property excluded.

In United States v. Lopez (1995) case, the act was declared unconstitutional (on federalism grounds, not due to any violation of the Second Amendment), but it was reenacted in a slightly different form in 1996.

== See also ==
- Concealed carry in the United States
- Gun ownership
- Gun politics
- Gun politics in the US
- Gun laws in the United States (by state)
- Gun-free zone
- 2018 United States gun violence protests
- Assault weapons legislation in the United States
- Gun culture in the United States
- One handgun a month law
