= Gun laws in Maine =

Location of Maine in the United States

Gun laws in Maine regulate the sale, possession, and use of firearms and ammunition in the U.S. state of Maine.

== Summary table ==
| Subject / law | Long guns | Handguns | Relevant statutes | Notes |
|---|---|---|---|---|
| State permit required to purchase? | No | No | | |
| Firearm registration? | No | No | 25 M.R.S. § 2014 | |
| Assault weapon law? | No | No | | |
| Magazine capacity restriction? | No | No | | |
| Owner license required? | No | No | | |
| Red flag law? | Yes | Yes | 34-B M.R.S. § 3862-A | |
| Permit required for concealed carry? | N/A | No | 25 M.R.S. § 2001-A; 25 M.R.S. § 2003 | Maine is a "shall issue" state for citizens and lawful permanent residents who are 18 years or older. Permitless carry took effect on October 12, 2015. |
| Permit required for open carry? | No | No | | May carry openly without permit, except in state parks and some other locations. |
| Castle Doctrine/Stand Your Ground law? | No | No | 17-A M.R.S. § 108 | |
| State preemption of local restrictions? | Yes | Yes | 25 M.R.S. § 2011 | |
| NFA weapons restricted? | No | No | | |
| Shall certify? | Yes | Yes | 25 M.R.S. § 2013 | Shall certify within 15 days. |
| Peaceable Journey laws? | No | No | | |
| Background checks required for private sales? | Some | Some | | Required if the sales are at gun shows or the guns were advertised for sale. |
| Duty to inform? | No | Yes | 25 M.R.S. § 2003-A | Only when carrying without a permit. |

== State constitutional protection ==
Article I, Section 16 of the Constitution of Maine states:

"Every citizen has a right to keep and bear arms and this right shall never be questioned."

== State provisions and prohibitions ==
- Maine has state preemption of firearms laws. No political subdivision of the state may adopt any law regulating firearms or ammunition, except for regulating the discharge of firearms.
- A municipality may not sue a firearm or ammunition manufacturer for damages relating to the lawful design, manufacture, marketing or sale of firearms or ammunition. A municipality may bring legal action for breach of contract or warranty.
- Employers in Maine may not prohibit their employees from keeping a firearm in the employee's vehicle if the employee has a valid permit to carry the concealed firearm and the firearm is concealed in the employee's own locked vehicle. Employers may prohibit firearms on their premises other than in their parking lot under the conditions specified in the law.
- Some localities have adopted Second Amendment sanctuary resolutions.

=== Concealed carry ===
Maine is a constitutional carry (permitless concealed or open carry) and "shall issue" state for concealed carry. The issuing authority for permits are the local police, or the state police. As of October 15, 2015, a permit is not needed to carry a firearm – concealed or open – in the state of Maine, provided that the carrier is legally allowed to own a gun and is over 21 or a member or veteran of the military and over age 18. Concealed carry permits are still available (and are needed in order to legally carry weapons in various other states with which Maine has reciprocity agreements as well as for those under 21); such permits shall be issued within 30 days to a qualified applicant (who has to show proficiency in the use of pistols) and who has been a Maine resident for at least five years, or within 60 days to a nonresident or a resident for less than five years. The permit is valid for four years.

=== Open carry ===
Open carry is allowed without a permit. However, possession of firearms is not lawful in establishments licensed to serve alcohol for consumption on premises (bars, clubs, certain restaurants and so on) provided there is a "no firearms" sign posted in a manner reasonably likely to come to the attention of patrons or if the carrier of firearms is under the influence of alcohol or drugs by the same standards as applicable for operating a motor vehicle. Open carry is not lawful in Federal buildings. Maine honors concealed carry permits from several other states.

=== Hunting ===
For hunters, a semi-automatic firearm's magazine capacity can not exceed 6 cartridges (5 in the magazine +1 in the chamber). For migratory game bird hunting, shotgun capacity is 3 shells. Upland bird hunting follows the semi-automatic laws. This is stated in Maine hunting law, but not Maine firearm law. Firearms, even if by definition it qualifies as a "hunting firearm", have no magazine capacity restriction. It only becomes a crime if one actively, or has previously, hunted while violating the magazine capacity restriction. These provisions do not apply to .22 caliber rimfire guns or to auto-loading pistols with a barrel length of less than 8 inches. Maine allows the use of suppressors (also known as "silencers") for hunting.
