= Gun laws in New Hampshire =

Location of New Hampshire in the United States

Gun laws in New Hampshire regulate the sale, possession, and use of firearms and ammunition in the state of New Hampshire in the United States.

New Hampshire allows the concealed or open carry of handguns without a permit. Background checks are not required for privates sales of firearms. The state has no laws defining or restricting certain firearms as assault weapons.

== Summary table ==
| Subject / law | Long guns | Handguns | Relevant statutes | Notes |
|---|---|---|---|---|
| State permit required to purchase? | No | No | NHRS XII § 159:14 | |
| Firearm registration? | No | No | | |
| Assault weapon law? | No | No | | |
| Magazine capacity restriction? | No | No | | |
| Owner license required? | No | No | | |
| Permit required for concealed carry? | N/A | No | NHRS XII § 159:6 | New Hampshire is a "shall issue" state for residents and non-residents who are 18 years or older and is one of the few states that will issue to non-citizens living outside of the United States. Permitless carry took effect on February 22, 2017. |
| Permit required for open carry? | No | No | NHRS XII § 159:6; NHRS XVIII § 207:7 | May carry openly without permit. Loaded long guns prohibited in motor vehicles. |
| Castle doctrine/stand your ground law? | Yes | Yes | NHRS LXII § 627 | |
| State preemption of local restrictions? | Yes | Yes | NHRS XII § 159:26 | "Except as otherwise specifically provided by statute, no ordinance or regulation of a political subdivision may regulate the sale, purchase, ownership, use, possession, transportation, licensing, permitting, taxation, or other matter pertaining to firearms, firearms components, ammunition, or firearms supplies in the state. Nothing in this section shall be construed as affecting a political subdivision's right to adopt zoning ordinances for the purpose of regulating firearms or knives businesses in the same manner as other businesses ..." |
| NFA weapons restricted? | No | No | | |
| Peaceable journey laws? | No | No | | |
| Background checks required for private sales? | No | No | | |

== State constitutional provisions ==
Article 2-a of the Constitution of New Hampshire states:

"All persons have the right to keep and bear arms in defense of themselves, their families, their property and the state."

== Concealed and open carry ==
Since February 22, 2017, New Hampshire has been a constitutional carry state, requiring no license to open carry or concealed carry a firearm in public. Concealed carry permits are still issued for purposes of reciprocity with other states.

The New Hampshire license is issued for carry of a "pistol or revolver", and is not a license to carry "weapons" as exists in some other states. The New Hampshire license is issued by the local mayor, selectmen, or police department at a cost of $10 for residents, and by the New Hampshire State Police at a cost of $100 for non-residents (changed from $20 on July 1, 2009). The term of issue of the license is five years. Turn around time is generally one to two weeks, with fourteen days being the maximum time allowed by law.

New Hampshire has no laws restricting the age at which a person may possess and carry firearms.

On June 2, 2016, the New Hampshire Supreme Court, in Bach v. New Hampshire Dept. of Safety, No. 2014–0721, 2016 WL 3086130, threw out a rule imposed by concealed carry permit issuing authorities that had required non-residents to have a permit to carry issued by the state in which they resided. The basis for invalidating such rule was that it denied a New Hampshire non-resident permit to residents of jurisdictions that are effectively No-Issue, such as New Jersey, California, Hawaii, and others.

== See also ==
- Hunting license
- Law of New Hampshire
- Second Amendment to the United States Constitution
- Suicide in the United States
