= Gun laws in Hawaii =

Map of the United States with Hawaii highlighted and zoomed for detail

Gun laws in Hawaii regulate the sale, possession, and use of firearms and ammunition in the state of Hawaii, United States. Hawaii's gun laws are among the most restrictive in the country.

== Summary table ==
Subject / law	Long guns	Handguns	Relevant statutes	Notes
State permit required to purchase?	Yes	Yes	§134-2	Must be 21 years old to acquire a permit to purchase.
Firearm registration?	Yes	Yes	HRS 0134-0003	Must be registered with county police chief within 5 days of purchase or arrival to Hawaii. Registration not required for black powder and pre-1899 firearms. May not bring firearm into the state if under 21.
Assault weapon law?	No	Yes		Law bans assault pistols with two or more banned features. Does not apply to rifles or shotguns with a barrel length greater than 16 inches (41 cm)
Magazine capacity restriction?	No	Yes	HRS134-8(c) HRS134-11(3)	Any magazine with a capacity of more than 10 rounds that can be inserted into a pistol is prohibited. Members of organizations are exempt from the pistol magazine limit at places of target shooting.
Owner license required?	No	No		No license required to own any firearms in Hawaii, but all firearms, including those brought into the state by new residents, must be registered.
Permit required for concealed carry?	N/A	Yes	HRS 0134-0009	Permits are granted on a shall issue basis. While Hawaii has a may-issue law and historically approved almost no concealed carry permit applications, its law has been permanently enjoined since the Supreme Court's decision in NYSPRA v. Bruen on June 23, 2022. This ruling held that the Second Amendment protects an individual's right to carry a handgun outside the home, abrogating Hawaii's may-issue concealed carry law. Prior to the ruling, the chief of police in each county could grant a permit "in an exceptional case, when an applicant shows reason to fear injury to the applicant's person or property." On July 7, 2022, the state's attorney general formally acknowledged that the licensing officials could no longer enforce this clause in light of the Bruen decision.
Permit required for open carry?	Yes	Yes		By law, Hawaii is a Licensed Open Carry State, but since licenses are rarely issued, the state is Non-Permissive for open carry in practice. The chief of police may grant a permit "Where the urgency or the need has been sufficiently indicated" provided that the person "is engaged in the protection of life and property." In practice, Hawaii is "No-Issue," as issuing authorities rarely or never approve applications for permits. On July 24, 2018, the Ninth Circuit Court of Appeals ruled that Hawaii's laws restricting open carry are unconstitutional. That ruling was vacated on February 8, 2019, and the case was reheard en banc on September 24, 2020. On March 24, 2021, the en banc court ruled that Hawaii's restrictions on the open carrying of firearms are outside the historical scope of the Second Amendment and therefore the laws restricting open carry are constitutional. No laws against open carrying long guns. The Bruen decision has left the no issuance of open carry licenses in a grey area at this point.
State preemption of local restrictions?	Yes	Yes		Municipalities may enact and enforce local regulations only if they are identical to, and provide the same penalty as, state law.
NFA weapons restricted?	Yes	Yes		Machine guns, short barreled rifles, short barreled shotguns, and silencers/suppressors are prohibited from the average citizen. Certain Destructive Devices and AOWs are allowed with proper tax stamp and NFA paperwork from the ATF.
Peaceable journey laws?	No	No	None	Federal laws observed.
Background checks required for private sales?	Yes	Yes	HRS §134-2	A person who wants to purchase a handgun or long gun must obtain a permit to acquire the ownership of a firearm, which requires a background check of the applicant.
Red flag law?	Yes	Yes		Hawaii passed a red flag law in late June 2019.
Duty to inform?	Yes	Yes		

Hawaii was a "may issue" state for concealed carry and open carry. "In an exceptional case, when an applicant shows reason to fear injury to the applicant's person or property," a license to carry a pistol or revolver (which allows both open and concealed carry) may be granted or denied at the discretion of the county police chief. After the U.S. Supreme Court's decision in New York State Rifle and Pistol Association v. Bruen, applications for concealed carry permits have started to be issued on all of the major islands (except Oahu). As of December 2022 the numbers issued on each island are not currently available. Permits are valid in the issuing county only, and are weapon specific, with the permit holder required to both state the actual weapon to be carried, and take a shooting proficiency test with that weapon. Hawaii does not recognize concealed carry permits issued by other states.

Acquiring a firearm in Hawaii requires a permit to acquire, issued to qualified applicants passing a criminal background check by the county police chief. There is a minimum 14- to 20-day waiting period for receiving a permit. A separate permit is required for each handgun(s) transaction to be acquired (valid for a period of 10 days), while a "long gun" permit can be used for any number of rifles or shotguns for a period of one year. The requirement to provide an affidavit of mental health was enjoined. First time applicants are required to pay to be fingerprinted by the FBI. When applying to acquire a handgun, a handgun safety training course affidavit or hunter's education card is also required.

Firearms acquired within the state must be registered with the chief of police within 5 days. Firearms brought in from out of state, including those owned prior to moving to Hawaii, must be registered within 3 days of arrival. Registration of firearms brought in from out of state does not involve a waiting period, however an FBI fingerprint and background check will be conducted. Registration is not required for black-powder firearms or firearms manufactured before 1899.

Carrying a loaded firearm, concealed or not concealed, including in a vehicle is a class B felony. Unloaded firearms that are secured in a gun case and are accompanied by a corresponding permit are allowed to be transported in a vehicle between the permitted owner's residence, business or sojourn and: a place of repair; a target range; a licensed dealer's place of business; an organized, scheduled firearms show or exhibit; a place of formal hunter or firearm use training or instruction; or a police station., unless covered under a current concealed carry permit.

Fully automatic firearms, shotguns with barrels less than 18 inches (46 cm) long, and rifles with barrels less than 16 inches (41 cm) long are prohibited by state law. Also banned are handgun magazines that can hold more than 10 rounds of ammunition, and semi-automatic handguns with certain combinations of features that the state has defined as assault pistols.

Non-residents may transport a firearm to the state, which requires registration at a police station within 72 hours of arrival. Current law requires fingerprinting and photograph. A permit is provided for each firearm make/model/serial number. Subsequent registration of other firearms do not require the fingerprinting and photograph (nor the fee). Once registered the permit is valid statewide in all counties.

Firearms that are lost, stolen, or destroyed are required to be reported to the police within 24 hours.
