= Gun laws in American Samoa =

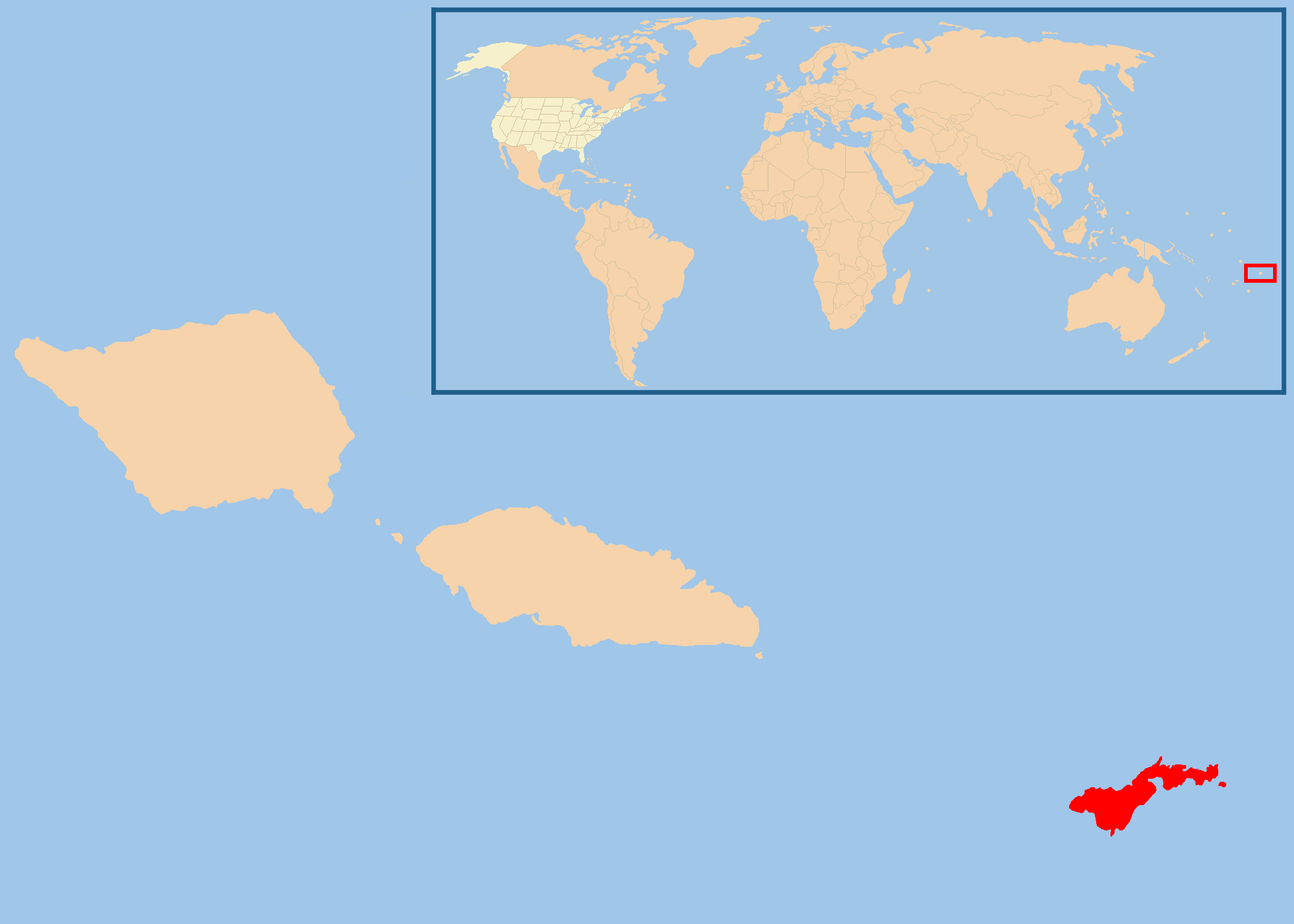
Location of American Samoa in relation to the continental United States

Gun laws in American Samoa regulate the sale, possession, and use of firearms and ammunition in the unincorporated territory of American Samoa.

== Summary table ==
Subject/Law	Long guns	Handguns	Relevant statutes	Notes
Permit required to purchase?	Yes	N/A		A license is required to possess or import long guns or ammunition. Handguns are prohibited for civilian possession despite D.C. v Heller and McDonald v Chicago.
Firearm registration?	Yes	Yes		All firearms must be registered with the American Samoa Public Safety Department.
Assault weapon law?	No	No		All handguns and centerfire firearms banned; Only 12, 16, 20 and 410 gauge shotguns and shotgun shells and 22 caliber rifles and their ammunitions are allowed
Magazine capacity restriction?	No	No		
Concealed carry allowed?	N/A	No		Concealed carry is illegal.
License required for open carry?	Yes	Yes		Open carry is legal for holders of a valid License to Possess which are required to purchase and possess firearms; though Licenses to Possess have been restricted to only shotguns and rimfire rifles since 1991, effectively banning handguns. Licenses issued for handguns and other firearms prior to 1991 are grandfathered as long as they remain valid.
NFA weapons restricted?	Yes	Yes		Explosive weapons, machine guns, gas guns, short barreled rifles, short barreled shotguns, and silencers are prohibited.
Peaceable journey laws?	No	No		Federal law (FOPA) applies.

== Licensing process ==
American Samoa has a very stringent and restrictive licensing process necessary in order to purchase a firearm in American Samoa. A person has to be 21 to get a weapons license along with several other requirements. Open carry is allowed with a weapons license, concealed carry is illegal. A person who wants to obtain a license to possess a firearm must provide genuine reason why the firearm may be required. The applicant must provide signed affidavits testifying to their good character and their stated need for each firearm from the village mayor, county chief and the police. The most commonly accepted reasons for ownership are plantation protection and hunting but ownership for self-defense is not a valid reason for a license to own a gun in American Samoa. The police must approve any transfer of a firearm between persons.

== Prohibited firearms and ammunition ==
All firearms including automatic firearms, semi-automatic rifles, and handguns are prohibited from civilian possession. Civilians can only own 12-gauge, 16-gauge, 20-gauge and .410 shotguns and .22 caliber rifles with a license. They also can only own ammunition for those types of firearms with a license; possession of any other type of ammunition, whether the person has a license or not, is illegal.
