= Gun laws in Kansas =

Location of Kansas in the United States

Gun laws in Kansas regulate the sale, possession, and use of firearms and ammunition in the state of Kansas in the United States.

== Summary table ==
Subject / law	Long guns	Handguns	Relevant statutes	Notes
State permit required to purchase?	No	No		
Firearm registration?	No	No		
Assault weapon law?	No	No		
Magazine capacity restriction?	No	No		
Owner license required?	No	No		
Permit required for concealed carry?	N/A	No	K.S.A. § 21-6302; K.S.A. § 75-7c03(a)	Kansas is a "shall issue" state for citizens and lawful permanent residents who are 18 years or older. Regular permits are issued to those 21 or older, and Provisional permits are issued to those 18 to 21. Permitless carry took effect on July 1, 2015.
Permit required for open carry?	No	No	K.S.A. § 75-7c03(a)	May carry openly without permit.
Castle Doctrine/Stand Your Ground law?	Yes	Yes	K.S.A. § 21-5222	
State preemption of local restrictions?	Yes	Yes	K.S.A. § 12-16,124; K.S.A. § 75-7c17	
NFA weapons restricted?	No	No	K.S.A. §§ 50-1201 to 50-1211	The Second Amendment Protection Act prohibits Kansas law enforcement from enforcing the NFA if a personal firearm, a firearm accessory, or ammunition is owned or manufactured commercially or privately in Kansas and remains within the borders of Kansas. A firearm manufactured in Kansas must have the words "made in Kansas" clearly stamped on a central metallic part, such as the receiver or frame. Federal enforcement is still possible.
Shall certify?	Yes	Yes	K.S.A. § 48-1906	Shall certify within 15 days.
Peaceable Journey laws?	No	No		
Background checks required for private sales?	No	No		

== Kansas gun laws ==
Despite having relatively nonrestrictive firearms laws, Kansas remained one of the few states with no provision for the concealed carry of firearms until March 2006, when the legislature passed Senate Bill 418, "The Personal and Family Protection Act." This bill made Kansas the 47th state to permit concealed carry in some form and the 36th state with a "shall issue" policy. The bill was passed 30–10 in the state senate and 91–33 in the state house of representatives, gaining enough votes to override a veto from Governor Kathleen Sebelius, who had previously vetoed several other attempts to legalize concealed carry. Under the law, the Attorney General began granting permits to qualified applicants on January 1, 2007. Previously, Kansas had allowed only open carry of firearms, except where prohibited by local ordinance.

On April 21, 2008, Governor Kathleen Sebelius signed a bill allowing the sale and possession of NFA weapons. The law took effect on July 1, 2008.

On April 22, 2014, Governor Sam Brownback signed HB 2578, the CLEO Shall Sign and Comprehensive Preemption legislation. These new laws went into effect on July 1, 2014. Effective on that date there will no longer be any local control of firearms. All current local firearms ordinances are null and void and all firearms laws are uniform statewide. The bill:

- Prohibits any city or county from expending funds derived from the proceeds of implementing, administering or operating a firearms buyback program.
- Preempts any and all local control of firearms and ammunition. No city or county or agent of such will be able to adopt any ordinance, resolution or regulation or take any administrative action governing the purchase, transfer, ownership, storage, carrying on one's person or transporting firearms or ammunition or any component or combination thereof.
- No city or county or agent of such will be able to adopt any ordinance, resolution or regulation relating to the sale of a firearm by an individual who holds a federal firearms license that is more restrictive than any ordinance or regulation relating to the sale of any other commercial good.
- Clarifies that no municipality can enact any ordinance, resolution, regulation or tax relating to the transportation, possession, carrying, sale, transfer, purchase, gift, devise, licensing, registration or use of a knife or knife making components. Nullifies all existing past ordinances and prohibits future ones.
- Prohibits the destruction of seized firearms once they are no longer needed as evidence. They may be traded with other departments and KBI, sold or traded to licensed firearms dealers, used for testing or comparison by the forensics laboratory or given to the Kansas Department of Wildlife Parks and Tourism for use in Hunter Education programs. Payments for transfers will be credited to the asset seizure and forfeiture fund of the seizing agency.
- If a weapon is seized from an individual and they are not convicted or adjudicated of a crime that prevents firearms ownership, it shall be verified it is not stolen and upon verification returned to the individual from whom it was seized within 30 days.
- Cleans up the Knife Act from 2013 providing intended prohibition of enforcement of local ordinances passed prior to July 1, 2013, and addresses possession of knives by convicted felons. While daggers, dirks, dangerous knives, straight-edged razors, and stilettos are added back in to the law it is with an express intent and caveat that they are only prohibited for use with the intent to use it against another person unlawfully.
- Prohibits municipalities from requiring disclosure or making a record of concealed carry permits. Cities and counties are permitted to adopt ordinances, resolutions, or regulations relative to the personnel policies governing concealed carry of handguns by city or county employees, so long as in compliance with this law. The bill requires any such records created by a municipality before the effective date of the bill be destroyed by July 31, 2014.
- Requires that certification by a chief law enforcement officer (CLEO), when a sign off is required for the transfer of a firearm or other item regulated by the National Firearms Act ("NFA"), be provided within fifteen days as long as the applicant is not prohibited by law from receiving the firearm or other item.

Kansas allows permitless carry for those 21 and older, even when on a college campus. According to The Trace, "state universities can still prohibit guns from buildings if they install metal detectors and security guards at entrances." In 2021, Kansas lowered the age to receive a conceal carry permit to age 18.

== See also ==
- Law of Kansas
