= Gun laws in Utah =

Location of Utah in the United States

Gun laws in Utah regulate the sale, possession, and use of firearms and ammunition in the state of Utah in the United States.

Utah's firearm laws are some of the more permissive in the United States. A 2013 study ranked Utah as the lowest among all 50 states in the category of gun control legislation. Under Utah law, violent crimes with firearms, criminal possession of firearms, and criminal negligence with firearms may all be prosecuted as felonies, and strictly punished under state law. Being part of the Western United States and Rocky Mountain States, Utah is home to a strong gun culture.

== Summary table ==
Subject / law	Long guns	Handguns	Relevant statutes	Notes
State permit required to purchase?	No	No		
Firearm registration?	No	No		
Assault weapon law?	No	No		
Magazine capacity restriction?	No	No		
Owner license required?	No	No		
Permit required for concealed carry?	N/A	no	https://le.utah.gov/xcode/Title53/Chapter5A/53-5a-S102.2.html	Concealed carrying a long gun, shotgun, or muzzleloader is prohibited without a valid permit. Those above 21 or with a valid permit may concealed carry a loaded or unloaded handgun, except in prohibited areas. A concealed carry permit is available to anyone above 18 without a felony or certain violent convictions who doesn’t engage in criminal or risky behavior, such as drug use or excessive drinking. Permits lift restrictions for carry in or around public schools or higher education. They also affords other rights, such as allowing possession of a loaded long gun in vehicle and the waiving of background checks when purchasing from licensed firearms dealer.
Permit required for open carry?	n/a	no	https://le.utah.gov/xcode/Title53/Chapter5A/53-5a-S102.2.html	Under laws enacted in 05/07/2025, one may not open carry a loaded long gun, shotgun, or muzzleloader in a vehicle. Those above 21 years old without a permit or between 18-20 possessing a valid CWP may open carry a loaded firearm in unprohibited areas. Exceptions allow for lawfully carrying a loaded handgun in a vehicle one owns or is allowed in, and open carrying of unloaded weapons, for anyone above 18 and in legal possession of the firearm.
Castle Doctrine law?	Yes	Yes	UT Code § 76-2-405	Force in defense of habitation. "(1) A person is justified in using force against another when and to the extent that he reasonably believes that the force is necessary to prevent or terminate the other's unlawful entry into or attack upon his habitation; however, he is justified in the use of force which is intended or likely to cause death or serious bodily injury only if: (a) the entry is made or attempted in a violent and tumultuous manner, surreptitiously, or by stealth, and he reasonably believes that the entry is attempted or made for the purpose of assaulting or offering personal violence to any person, dwelling, or being in the habitation and he reasonably believes that the force is necessary to prevent the assault or offer of personal violence; or (b) he reasonably believes that the entry is made or attempted for the purpose of committing a felony in the habitation and that the force is necessary to prevent the commission of the felony. (2) The person using force or deadly force in defense of habitation is presumed for the purpose of both civil and criminal cases to have acted reasonably and had a reasonable fear of imminent peril of death or serious bodily injury if the entry or attempted entry is unlawful and is made or attempted by use of force, or in a violent and tumultuous manner, or surreptitiously or by stealth, or for the purpose of committing a felony."
Stand Your Ground law?	Yes	Yes	UT Code § 76-2-402	Force in defense of person – Forcible felony defined. "(1) (a) A person is justified in threatening or using force against another when and to the extent that the person reasonably believes that force or a threat of force is necessary to defend the person or a third person against another person's imminent use of unlawful force. (b) A person is justified in using force intended or likely to cause death or serious bodily injury only if the person reasonably believes that force is necessary to prevent death or serious bodily injury to the person or a third person as a result of another person's imminent use of unlawful force, or to prevent the commission of a forcible felony."
State preemption of local restrictions?	Yes	Yes	UT Code § 53-5a-102 UT Code § 76-10-500	
NFA weapons restricted?	No	No		
Shall certify?	Yes	Yes	UT Code § 53-5a-104	Shall certify within 15 days.
Peaceable Journey laws?	Yes	Yes	UT Code § 76-10-523(4)	
Background checks required for private sales?	No	No		

== Overview ==
Utah allows for open carry of unloaded firearms without a concealed firearm permit. "Unloaded" as it applies here, means that there is no round in the firing position (or chamber), and the firearm is at least two "mechanical actions" from firing. As carrying the firearm with the chamber empty, but with a full magazine, meets this definition (the handler must chamber a round, and then pull the trigger), this is a common work around for Utah residents who do not wish to acquire a permit. Without the permit, the firearm must be clearly visible. Open carry of a loaded pistol without a permit is now allowed for anyone age 21 and up.

Utah does not require a permit to carry a concealed or open firearm. As of May 5, 2021 anyone over the age of 21 resident or nonresident may concealed or open carry permitless. Utah does not require concealed carry permit holders to notify police officers of their permit or possession of firearms when stopped by police officers, but the state Bureau of Criminal Identification recommends doing so "for the safety of all involved" and to give the officer "some assurance they are most likely dealing with a law abiding citizen."

Utah law allows for a "Non-Resident" Concealed Firearm Permits to be issued. The Utah Concealed Firearm Permit is valid in thirty-four states across the US. However there are several states that have passed statutes that do not honor a "Non-Resident" permit. For example, Colorado will honor Utah's permit, but the permittee must be a resident of Utah for his permit to be valid. Utah concealed firearm permits are "shall issue" and will be issued to anyone meeting the requirements.

Utah is a "Castle Doctrine" state, in which there is no duty to retreat before use of deadly force, if the person reasonably believes that a perpetrator is going to commit a forcible felony in the habitation*, and that the force is necessary to prevent the commission of the felony. Since burglary is itself a forcible felony, it is legal to use deadly force to stop a burglar.

In Utah a person may carry firearms in some places not allowed by some other states, including banks, bar, and state parks. With a permit, you may also carry in schools (K-12) and state Universities. Utah's Uniform Firearm Laws expressly prohibits public schools from enacting or enforcing any rule pertaining to firearms. Utah requires public schools to allow lawful firearms possession.

== Buying, selling and owning firearms ==
=== Private sales ===
Private sales of firearms are legal in Utah to anyone over the age of 18 UCA 76-10-S509.9.

Online classified websites are a common meeting place for buyers and sellers. One highly utilized internet site was the classified advertising section of news station KSL-TV. However, after the Sandy Hook Elementary School shooting in December 2012, KSL temporarily disallowed sales or advertising of firearms. KSL has yet to rescind their stance.

=== Prohibited persons ===
There are two categories of persons who may not possess firearms or dangerous weapons under Utah law. Penalties for weapons possession by category I restricted persons are more severe than the penalties for possession by category II restricted persons.

Category I covers persons who have "been convicted of any violent felony" or are "on probation or parole for any felony" or have been "within the last 10 years an adjudicated delinquent for an offense which if committed by an adult would have been a violent felony".

Under Utah law, "A Category I restricted person who intentionally or knowingly agrees, consents, offers, or arranges to purchase, transfer, possess, use, or have under his custody or control, or who intentionally or knowingly purchases, transfers, possesses, uses, or has under his custody or control any firearm is guilty of a second degree felony."

Category II covers persons who have "been convicted of or are under indictment for any felony" or have "within the last seven years been an adjudicated delinquent for an offense which if committed by an adult would have been a felony" or are "an unlawful user of a controlled substance" or have "been found not guilty by reason of insanity for a felony offense" or have "been found mentally incompetent to stand trial for a felony offense" or have "been adjudicated as mentally defective as provided in the Brady Handgun Violence Prevention Act" or are "an alien who is illegally or unlawfully in the United States" or have "has been dishonorably discharged from the armed forces" or have "renounced his citizenship after having been a citizen of the United States".

A Category II restricted person who purchases, transfers, possesses, uses, or has under his custody or control any firearm is guilty of a third degree felony under Utah law.

=== NFA firearms ===
Under Utah state law, "Any person who transfers in violation of applicable state or federal law a sawed-off rifle, sawed-off shotgun, or fully automatic weapon to a minor is guilty of a third degree felony."

== Carrying concealed firearms ==
Utah is a shall issue state for permits for the concealed carry of firearms. Utah law states "The bureau shall issue a permit to carry a concealed firearm for lawful self defense to an applicant who is 21 years of age or older within 60 days after receiving an application, unless the bureau finds proof that the applicant does not meet the qualifications set forth". Permits are issued to both Utah residents and non residents. Applicants between 18 and 20 may obtain a provisional permit.

Persons convicted of a felony, any crime of violence, any offense involving alcohol, any offense involving the unlawful use of narcotics or other controlled substances, any offense involving moral turpitude, any offense involving domestic violence, or persons found by any court to be mentally incompetent are automatically barred from being issued a permit. Any person barred by state or federal law from possessing a firearm may not be issued a permit.

Additionally, "The bureau may deny, suspend, or revoke a concealed firearm permit if it has reasonable cause to believe that the applicant or permit holder has been or is a danger to self or others as demonstrated by evidence". Examples of such evidence include "past pattern of behavior involving unlawful violence or threats of unlawful violence" or "past participation in incidents involving unlawful violence or threats of unlawful violence". In determining whether the applicant or permit holder has been or is a danger to self or others, the bureau may inspect expunged records of arrests and convictions of adults, and juvenile court records.

However, Utah law also states that "The bureau may not deny, suspend, or revoke a concealed firearm permit solely for a single conviction for an infraction violation of Title 76, Chapter 10, Part 5, Weapons".

Permit holders may appeal a permit suspension, denial or revocation. Utah law states that "In the event of a denial, suspension, or revocation of a permit, the applicant or permit holder may file a petition for review with the board within 60 days from the date the denial, suspension, or revocation is received by the applicant or permit holder".

=== Restrictions of concealed carry ===
Even with a carry permit, carrying a concealed firearm is not allowed in any church that notifies the State of Utah and makes public notice. A church must, by state law, make annual notice of this intent to prohibit firearms from their "houses of worship". The Church of Jesus Christ of Latter-day Saints prohibits the carrying of firearms in its "houses of worship"; they have current notice posted on the Utah Department of Public Safety's website. Prohibition of firearms from "houses of worship" does not necessarily include all property owned by the church. However, firearms are prohibited at all Church-owned colleges and office buildings. The two Church-owned colleges in Utah are Ensign College (formally known as LDS Business College) and Brigham Young University. Church campsites also prohibit weapons.

=== Penalties for concealed carrying without permit ===
Carrying a concealed firearm without a permit is legal in Utah.

=== Concealed firearms permit reciprocity ===
Utah recognizes any firearm carry permit issued by any state of the United States, or any political subdivision thereof.

As of December 2, 2022, 36 States recognize the Utah Permit (four of them require that the permit holder be a resident of Utah) and 14 States do not recognize the Utah Permit.

Recognize Utah Permit	Do Not Recognize Permit
Alabama	California
Alaska	Connecticut
Arizona	Hawaii
Arkansas	Illinois
Colorado	Maine
Delaware	Maryland
Florida	Massachusetts
Georgia	New Jersey
Idaho	New Mexico
Indiana	New York
Iowa	Oregon
Kansas	Rhode Island
Kentucky	South Carolina
Louisiana	
Michigan	
Minnesota	
Mississippi	
Missouri	
Montana	
Nebraska	
Nevada	
New Hampshire	
North Carolina	
North Dakota	
Ohio	
Oklahoma	
Pennsylvania	
South Dakota	
Tennessee	
Texas	
Utah	
Vermont	
Virginia	
Washington State	
West Virginia	
Wisconsin	
Wyoming	

=== Concealed carry on private property ===
Any person eligible to possess a firearm may carry that firearm, either concealed or unconcealed, in their own home or property, or on any private property with the consent of the property owner. Utah law allows holders of a Utah concealed firearm permit (CFP), including teachers with a Utah CFP, to carry a firearm on any public school premises.

== Specific crimes with firearms ==
Carrying a firearm with the intent to unlawfully assault another is a class A misdemeanor under Utah law.

Drawing or exhibiting a firearm in an angry and threatening manner, or unlawfully using a dangerous weapon in a fight or quarrel in the presence of two or more persons is a class A misdemeanor. This law does not apply when firearms are properly used in self-defense.

Negligently discharging a firearm in a manner that disturbs the peace or could damage or harm public or private property is a class B misdemeanor. Discharging a firearm in a manner that significantly endangers any person, or discharging a firearm into any habitable structure is third degree felony. If bodily injury to any person results from such negligent discharge, the offense can be elevated/enhanced to a second or first degree felony, depending upon the severity of the bodily injury or harm caused by the negligent discharge.

Any person who carries a firearm while under the influence of alcohol or a controlled substance is guilty of a class B misdemeanor.

== Right to keep and bear arms in state constitution ==
Article I, Section 6, of the Constitution of the State of Utah provides that: "The individual right of the people to keep and bear arms for security and defense of self, family, others, property, or the state, as well as for other lawful purposes shall not be infringed; but nothing herein shall prevent the Legislature from defining the lawful use of arms."

Some counties have adopted Second Amendment sanctuary resolutions.
