= Gun laws in Guam =

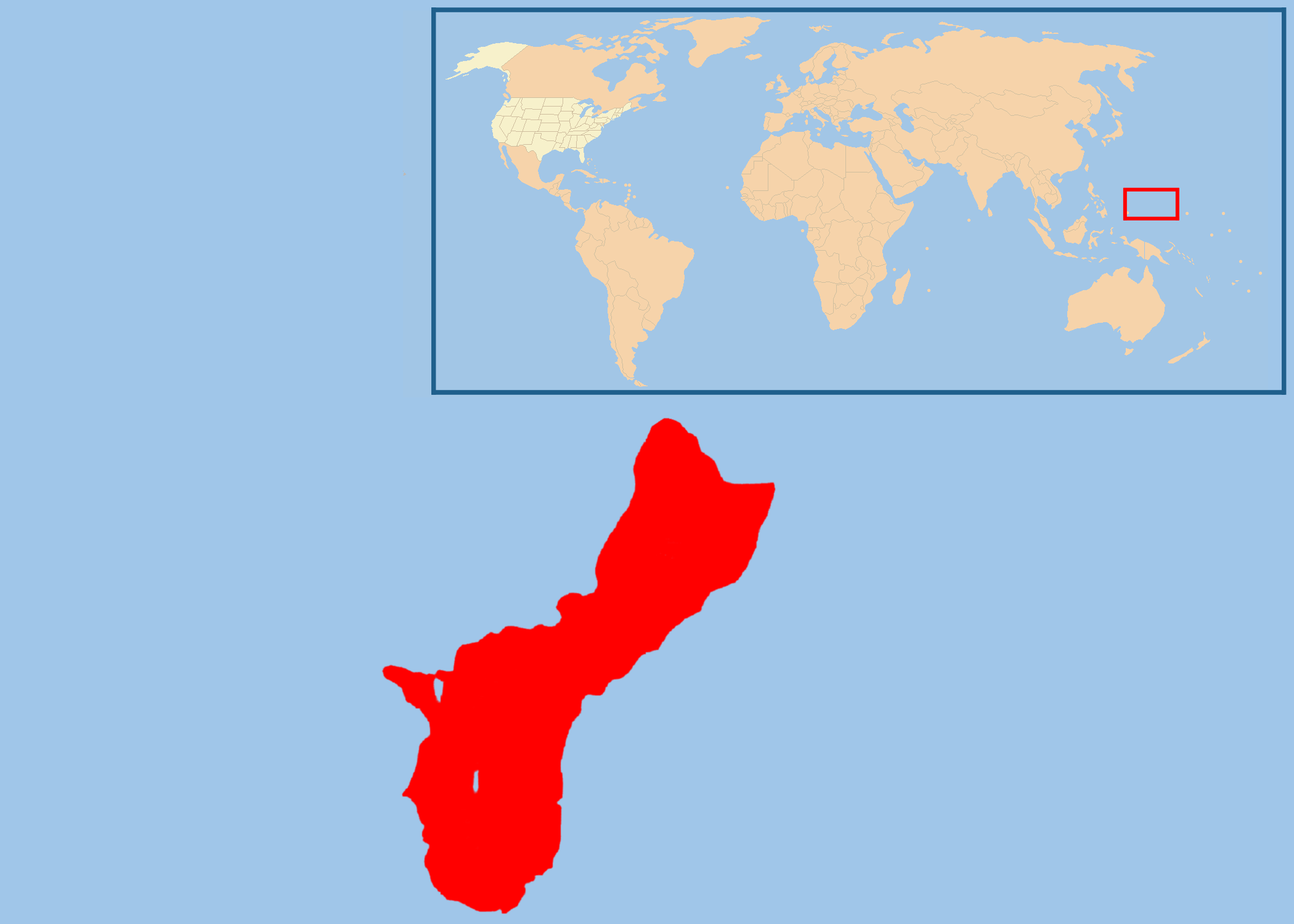
Location of Guam in relation to the continental United States

Gun laws in Guam regulate the sale, possession, and use of firearms and ammunition in Guam, an unincorporated territory of the United States.

As Guam is a territory of the United States, many U.S. federal laws apply, as well as Constitutional rulings and protections.

== Summary table ==
Subject/Law	Long guns	Handguns	Relevant Statutes	Notes
Permit required to purchase?	Yes	Yes	60103, 60106	A Firearms Identification Card, issued by the Guam Police Department, is required to purchase firearms on Guam.
Firearm registration?	Yes	Yes	60110	All firearms must be registered within three business days with the Guam Police Department.
Owner License Required	Yes	Yes	60106	An owner's license that states the firearms make, model, and date of purchase and registration is issued once the firearm is registered with the Guam Police Department.
License required for concealed carry?	N/A	Yes	60109	Shall Issue. Bill 296-32 passed by legislature for shall issue, signed by Governor Eddie Calvo.
License required for open carry?	Yes	Yes		Firearms Identification Card required.
Assault weapon law	No	No		None specified.
Magazine capacity restriction?	No	No		None specified.
NFA weapons restricted?	Yes	Yes	60102, 60103	Guam's Federal Firearms Licensees have no means of registering machine guns, short-barreled rifles and short-barreled shotguns under the National Firearms Act. All federal laws and statutes apply to the territory. Barrel length restrictions are present under the Guam Code Annotated and are similar to federal NFA law: Handgun barrels cannot exceed 12 in., rifle barrels cannot be shorter than 16 in., shotgun barrels cannot be shorter than 18 in. Previously restricted, firearm silencers are permitted as of July, 2025, provided that the specifications, purchase, ownership, possession, and use of a firearm silencer complies with applicable federal and local laws, rules, and regulations. Destructive devices and AOWs are legal with NFA tax stamp
Castle law	Yes	Yes		

== Open carry ==
A firearms ID card, valid for 3 years from date of issue, allows possession and open carry of all legal firearms in Guam. One may open carry handguns or long guns.

== Concealed carry ==
Guam was previously a may-issue jurisdiction, and generally approved very few permits (~50/year). Bill 296-32 was introduced by senators Tony Ada, Aline Yamashita, Chris Duenas, Tommy Morrison, Rory Respicio, Brant McCreadie and Michael San Nicolas, which after it was signed by Governor Eddie Calvo converted Guam to be a shall-issue jurisdiction. Guam is in the United States Court of Appeals for the Ninth Circuit.
