= Gun laws in Nevada =

Location of Nevada in the United States

Gun laws in Nevada regulate the sale, possession, and use of firearms and ammunition in the state of Nevada in the United States.

== Summary table ==
Subject / law	Long guns	Handguns	Relevant statutes	Notes
State permit required to purchase?	No	No		
Firearm registration?	No	No		As of June 2015, Clark County no longer requires the registration of handguns. There is now state preemption for firearm registration.
Owner license required?	No	No		
Permit required for concealed carry?	N/A	Yes	NRS 202§3657 - Application and PermittingNRS 202§360 - Prohibited Persons	Nevada is a "shall issue" state for concealed carry.
Permit required for open carry?	No	No	NV Constitution Article 1 Section 11 NRS 503§165 - Carrying loaded rifle or shotgun in or on vehicle on or along public way unlawful; exceptions.	Open carry is generally permitted throughout the state. For open carry in a vehicle, the firearm may be anywhere except concealed upon the person without a concealed firearm permit. Long guns carried openly in a vehicle may not have a round chambered, but may otherwise have a loaded magazine inserted or inside them.
State preemption of local restrictions?	Yes	Yes	NRS 244§364 - County of 700,000 or moreNRS 268§418 - City of 700,000 or moreNRS 269§222 - Town of 700,000 or more	Local authorities may regulate the discharge of firearms. Handgun registration in Clark County was grandfathered in, until SB175 (signed into law June 2nd, 2015) removed the authority of the county to register handguns in Nevada.
Assault weapon law?	No	No		
Magazine Capacity Restriction?	No	No		
NFA weapons restricted?	No	No	NRS 202§275 Possession, manufacture or disposition of short-barreled rifle or short-barreled shotgunNRS 202§350 Manufacture, importation, possession or use of dangerous weapon or silencer18 USC §922(b)4 - Unlawful Transfer27 CFR §478.98 - Sales or deliveries of destructive devices and certain firearms.	Possession and ownership of an SBR, SBS, machine gun (selective-fire weapon), or silencer, all NFA items, are subject to federal purview and regulation.
Background checks required for private sales?	Yes	Yes		In November 2016, Nevada voters approved Ballot Question 1, changing the law to require background checks for private sales. Nevada Attorney General Adam Laxalt opined that the law is unenforceable. A revised version was signed into law on February 15, 2019 to fix the deficiencies of Question 1. The law is set to go into effect in January 2020. Some local counties have adopted Second Amendment sanctuary resolutions in opposition.
Red flag law?	Yes	Yes		Police may confiscate firearms from those considered a threat.

== Concealed carry ==
Nevada is a "shall issue" state for concealed carry. The county sheriff shall issue a concealed firearms permit to applicants who qualify under state and federal law, who submit an application in accordance with the provisions of section NRS 202.3657. To apply for a Concealed Firearm Permit, a person must be 21 (18 for military), complete an approved course in firearm safety and demonstrate competence (qualify) with any handgun. Previously, a single permit applied to only those firearms the applicant qualified with. Under revised legislation, a single permit is valid for all handguns the person owns or may thereafter own. Holders of previous permit iterations are grandfathered per current law and are no longer constrained to their qualified firearms, nor qualified firearm action.

Note: The change in the law regarding competence with semi-automatic handguns is effective July 1, 2011 through Nevada Assembly Bill AB 282. This change is retroactive meaning that permits issued prior to July 1, 2011, that have specific semiautomatic firearms listed is the equivalent to having all semiautomatic firearms authorized.

States that honor a Nevada permit: Alaska, Arizona, Iowa, Idaho, Indiana, Kansas*, Kentucky, Louisiana, Michigan*, Minnesota, Missouri, Montana, Oklahoma, South Dakota, Tennessee, Texas, Utah (*Residential permits only).

As of July 1, 2021: The State of Nevada no longer honors carry permits from the following states; Florida, Mississippi, South Carolina, South Dakota, and Virginia.

As of 1 July 2016, other state permits that Nevada honors: Alaska, Arizona, Arkansas, Florida, Idaho Enhanced Permit, Illinois, Kansas, Kentucky, Louisiana, Massachusetts, Michigan, Minnesota, Mississippi Enhanced Permit, Montana, Nebraska, New Mexico, North Carolina, North Dakota (both types of permits), Ohio, Oklahoma, South Carolina, South Dakota Enhanced Permit, Tennessee, Texas, Utah, Virginia, West Virginia, Wisconsin, Wyoming. The law allows holders of valid permits from these states to carry a concealed weapon while in the State of Nevada. The valid permit along with current photo I.D. must be in the possession of the person at all times while carrying a concealed firearm.

On February 28, 2013, the Nevada Sheriffs' and Chiefs' association voted unanimously to end the recognition of Arizona concealed weapon permits.

Effective June 23, 2015 Nevada once again recognizes Arizona concealed weapon permits.

The concealed firearm permit cost differs depending on which county one applies in. The application must be turned in to the county in which the applicant resides. The permit is valid for five years.

== Open carry ==
Nevada is a traditional open carry state with no permit being required to carry openly, as well as complete state preemption of firearms laws. Effective June 2, 2016 SB 175 and SB 240 (duplicate provisions) is legislation that prohibits counties, cities, and towns from enacting ordinances more restrictive than state law. The legislature reserves for itself the right to legislate all areas of firearm law except unsafe discharge of firearms.

The regulation of the transfer, sale, purchase, possession, carrying, ownership, transportation, storage, registration and licensing of firearms, firearm accessories and ammunition in this State and the ability to define such terms is within the exclusive domain of the Legislature, and any other law, regulation, rule or ordinance to the contrary is null and void.

— NRS 244.364, Taken from text of SB 240.

== Registration of firearms ==
Nevada state law does not require the registration of firearms. Following the passage of SB 175, handgun registration (or registration of any kind), is no longer required in Clark County or anywhere in the state of Nevada for handguns or long-arms (which already did not require registration). Governor Brian Sandoval signed this bill into law on June 2, 2015.

== Other laws ==
AB 217, allows residents of contiguous states to purchase long guns in Nevada. It also allows Nevada residents to purchase long guns in non-contiguous states. This legislation brings Nevada in line with the protections provided by the Firearms Owners Protection Act, which allows for the interstate sale of long guns by federally licensed firearms dealers.

AB 282 ensures that concealed firearm permit holders' names and addresses remain confidential; revise Nevada state law to allow carrying of any semi-automatic pistol, as with revolvers, once qualified for a CCW permit with a semi-automatic pistol; allows carrying of firearms in Nevada state parks; and statutorily mandates a background investigation (which is currently being done by all Nevada sheriffs) for CCW permit renewals for the purpose of reinstating the National Instant Criminal Background Check System (NICS) exemption for Nevada, thus ensuring that permit holders do not have to go through a point-of-contact check for every firearm purchased, as long as the CCW permit is valid.

AB 291 bans bump stocks, enacts a red flag law, and requires safe storage of firearms.
