= Gun laws in West Virginia =

Location of West Virginia in the United States

Gun laws in West Virginia regulate the sale, possession, and use of firearms and ammunition in the U.S. state of West Virginia.

== Summary table ==
Subject / law	Long guns	Handguns	Relevant statutes	Notes
State permit required to purchase?	No	No		
Firearm registration?	No	No		
Assault weapon law?	No	No		
Magazine capacity restriction?	No	No		
Owner license required?	No	No		
Permit required for concealed carry?	N/A	No	§ 61-7-4 § 61-7-7	West Virginia is a "shall issue" state for citizens and lawful permanent residents who are 18 years or older. Regular permits are issued to those 21 or older, and Provisional permits are issued to those 18 to 21. Permitless carry took effect on May 24, 2016.
Permit required for open carry?	No	No		May carry openly without permit.
Castle Doctrine/Stand Your Ground law?	Yes	Yes	§ 55-7-22	
State preemption of local restrictions?	Yes	Yes	§ 8-12-5a	"Neither a municipality nor the governing body of any municipality may, by ordinance or otherwise, limit the right of any person to purchase, possess, transfer, own, carry, transport, sell, or store any deadly weapon, firearm, or pepper spray, or any ammunition or ammunition components to be used therewith nor to so regulate the keeping of gunpowder so as to directly or indirectly prohibit the ownership of the ammunition in any manner inconsistent with or in conflict with state law."
NFA weapons restricted?	No	No		
Shall certify?	Yes	Yes	§ 61-7-16	Shall certify within 30 days.
Peaceable Journey laws?	No	No		
Background checks required for private sales?	No	No		

== State constitutional provisions ==
Article III, § 22 of the Constitution of West Virginia states:

"A person has the right to keep and bear arms for the defense of self, family, home and state, and for lawful hunting and recreational use."

== West Virginia gun laws ==
West Virginia preempts local regulation of several aspects of firearms, though local regulations which were in effect prior to 1999 were grandfathered. Further, State agencies and institutions are not precluded from enacting laws which regulate firearms. Charleston, Dunbar, and South Charleston are known to have grandfathered local ordinances which prohibit weapons on city property and in city buildings. The City of Martinsburg is known to have a local ordinance that was passed after 1999, which prohibits weapons in city buildings, that is not grandfathered.

There are no firearms known to be prohibited by State law. Prohibited places include correctional facilities, primary and secondary school property (excluding firearms within a vehicle); buses; and events, courthouses, the State Capitol Complex and grounds, private property where posted, certain areas in Charleston, Dunbar, and South Charleston. There are age restrictions on the possession of firearms and some people are prohibited from possessing firearms due to certain criminal convictions or naturalization status. Private sales of firearms, including handguns, are legal and do not require the seller to perform a background check; however, it is unlawful to sell a firearm to a prohibited person.

Open carry of a handgun without a permit is legal in West Virginia at age 18, withstanding other applicable laws. No permit is necessary for concealed carry of a handgun for any individual over the age of 21 who is legally allowed to own a handgun. A permit is required for individuals 18–20 to carry a concealed handgun assuming they are otherwise legally allowed to own the firearm.

West Virginia enacted the castle doctrine on April 10, 2008. Some localities have adopted Second Amendment sanctuary resolutions. On April 27, 2021, Governor Jim Justice signed the Second Amendment Preservation and Anti-Federal Commandeering Act (HB 2694) which prohibits the federal commandeering of employees and agencies of the state for the purpose of enforcing federal firearms laws. HB 2694 also prohibits police departments and officers from executing red flag laws or federal search warrants on firearms, accessories, or ammunition of law abiding persons.
