= Gun laws in Mississippi =

Location of Mississippi in the United States

Gun laws in Mississippi regulate the sale, possession, and use of firearms and ammunition in the state of Mississippi in the United States. Gun laws in Mississippi are among the most permissive in the country, with no license or background check required to openly carry handguns most anywhere in the state.

== Summary table ==
Subject / law	Long guns	Handguns	Relevant statutes	Notes
State permit required to purchase?	No	No		
Firearm registration?	No	No		
Assault weapon law?	No	No		
Magazine capacity restriction?	No	No		
Owner license required?	No	No		
Permit required for concealed carry?	N/A	No	Miss. Code Ann. § 45-9-101; Miss. Code Ann. § 95-3-1; Miss. Code Ann. § 97-37-1; Miss. Code Ann. § 97-37-7(2)	Mississippi is a "shall issue" state for citizens and lawful permanent residents who are 21 years or older. Regular and Enhanced permits are issued. Enhanced permits are issued to those who complete a training course. Permitless carry took effect on April 15, 2016, and applies to the carry of handguns in "belt and shoulder holsters and sheaths." Some forms of concealed carry still require a permit (e.g., without a holster, or in an ankle holster). Enhanced concealed carry permits allow for carrying in all areas except for any police, sheriff or state highway patrol station; any detention facility, prison or jail; courtrooms during a judicial proceeding; and, any "place of nuisance".
Permit required for open carry?	No	No	Miss. Code Ann. § 45-9-101(14); Miss. Code Ann. § 97-37-1(4)	May carry openly without permit. Handguns must be carried in a "a sheath, belt holster or shoulder holster".
Castle Doctrine/Stand Your Ground law?	Yes	Yes	Miss. Code Ann. § 97-3-15	
State preemption of local restrictions?	Yes	Yes	Miss. Code Ann. § 45-9-51; Miss. Code Ann. § 45-9-53	"...no county or municipality may adopt any ordinance that restricts the possession, carrying, transportation, sale, transfer or ownership of firearms or ammunition or their components." However, local governments may regulate the discharge of firearms, the carrying of firearms at a public park or public meeting, or the use of firearms in cases of insurrection, riots, and natural disasters.
NFA weapons restricted?	No	No		
Peaceable Journey laws?	No	No		
Background checks required for private sales?	No	No		

== Concealed and open carry ==
Mississippi is a "shall issue" state for concealed carry. The Mississippi Department of Public Safety shall issue a license to carry a concealed pistol or revolver to a qualified applicant within 45 days. The license is valid for five years. Mississippi also recognizes all out-of-state carry permits as well. Concealed carry is not allowed in a school, courthouse, police station, detention facility, government meeting place, polling place, establishment primarily devoted to dispensing alcoholic beverages, athletic event, parade or demonstration for which a permit is required, passenger terminal of an airport, "place of nuisance" as defined in Mississippi Code section 95–3–1, or a location where a sign is posted and clearly visible from at least ten feet away saying that the "carrying of a pistol or revolver is prohibited". A license to carry a pistol or revolver is not required for open carry beginning July 1, 2013 (see above). A license is not required for transporting a concealed or visible firearm in a vehicle. As of April 15, 2016, a license is not required to carry concealed in certain manners (see above), effectively legalizing constitutional carry. Additionally, churches are now covered under the Castle Doctrine and state/local law enforcement are barred from enforcing federal regulations/executive orders not approved by Congress that violate the U.S. Constitution or Mississippi Constitution.

== State preemption ==
Mississippi has state preemption of many but not all firearm laws. No county or municipality may adopt any ordinance that restricts or requires the possession, transportation, sale, transfer or ownership of firearms or ammunition or their components. However, local governments may regulate the discharge of firearms, the carrying of firearms at a public park or public meeting, or the use of firearms in cases of insurrection, riots and natural disasters. Some counties have adopted Second Amendment sanctuary resolutions.

== Lawsuits ==
Lawsuits against manufacturers, distributors, or dealers for damages resulting from the lawful design, manufacture, distribution or sale of firearms are reserved to the state. However, local governments may bring suit for breach of contract or warranty or for defects in materials or workmanship.
