= Gun laws in the United States Virgin Islands =

Gun laws in American territory

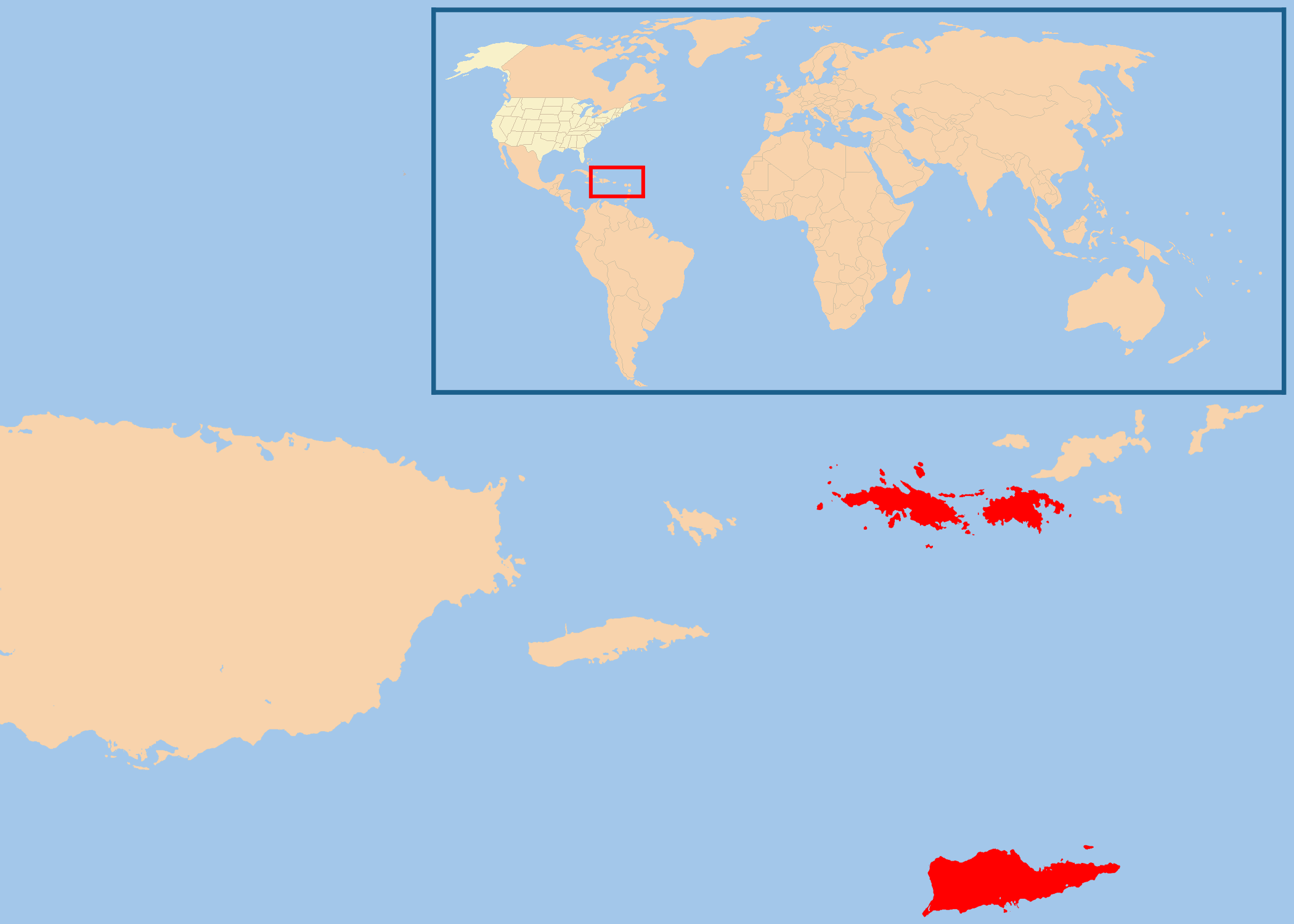
Location of the U.S. Virgin Islands in relation to the continental United States

In the United States Virgin Islands, law regulates the sale, possession, and use of firearms and ammunition. As the U.S. Virgin Islands are an unincorporated territory of the United States, many U.S. federal laws apply, as well as Constitutional rulings and protections.

== Summary table ==
Subject/Law	Long guns	Handguns	Relevant statutes	Notes
Permit required to purchase?	Yes	Yes		A license is required to purchase any firearm or ammunition.
Firearm registration?	Yes	Yes		All firearms must be registered with the Virgin Islands Police Department.
Assault weapon law?	Yes	Yes		Assault weapons and .50 BMG rifles prohibited.
Magazine capacity restriction?	Yes	Yes		
License required for concealed carry?	N/A	Yes		The territory currently has a "shall issue" policy for concealed carry permits due to the Supreme Court's Bruen decision. To obtain one, the applicant must meet a stringent set of requirements, so few people receive permits.
Open carry allowed?	No	No		Open carry is prohibited.
NFA weapons restricted?	Yes	Yes		Automatic firearms and short barreled shotguns are prohibited.
Peaceable journey laws?	No	No		Federal law (FOPA) applies.

== Licensing process ==
The U.S. Virgin Islands have a stringent and restrictive licensing process to purchase or carry a firearm. A person must be 21 to get a non-carry weapons license, along with several other requirements. Applicants must pay $75 licensing fee, submit a signed application, be fingerprinted and photographed, and be of good moral character. That process is just for a permit to purchase firearms to store in a residence or business, and not for a concealed carry permit. There are six types of licenses:

- Blue, Business Protection
- Yellow, Home protection and handguns only
- Gray, farming and long guns only
- White, all active law enforcement
- Pink, current and retired law enforcement, personal protection, and special circumstances
- Green, target shooting, sports use and home protection

As a result of the SCOTUS Bruen Decision, the police must issue a carry permit to anyone who is not already barred from owning a firearm.
