= LGBTQ rights in Ohio =

- Ohio (USA)
- Legal status: Legal since 1974
- Gender identity: State does since December 2020, allow change of sex on birth certificates for transgender people
- Discrimination protections: Protections in employment; several municipalities have passed further protections

Family rights
- Recognition of relationships: Same-sex marriage since 2015
- Adoption: Same-sex couples allowed to adopt

Lesbian, gay, bisexual, transgender, and queer (LGBTQ) people in the U.S. state of Ohio enjoy most of the same rights as non-LGBTQ people. Same-sex sexual activity has been legal in Ohio since 1974, and same-sex marriage has been legally recognized since June 2015 as a result of Obergefell v. Hodges. Ohio statutes do not address discrimination on account of sexual orientation and gender identity; however, the U.S. Supreme Court's ruling in Bostock v. Clayton County established that employment discrimination against LGBTQ people is illegal in 2020. In addition, a number of Ohio cities (including Athens, Columbus, Cincinnati, Cleveland, Dayton and Toledo) have passed anti-discrimination ordinances providing protections in housing and public accommodations. Conversion therapy is also banned in a number of cities. In December 2020, a federal judge invalidated a law banning sex changes on an individual's birth certificate within Ohio.

Recent opinion polls have shown that LGBT rights enjoy popular support in the state. A 2016 Public Religion Research Institute survey showed that 61% of Ohio residents supported same-sex marriage. Another survey by the same pollster in 2019 showed that 71% of respondents favored non-discrimination laws protecting LGBTQ people.

== History and legality of same-sex sexual activity ==
As part of the Northwest Territory, Ohio passed the "buggery" law, which provided the death sentence for homosexual sexual activity. In 1804, shortly after statehood, the law was repealed and sodomy was legalized. Despite several court decisions and newspaper articles acknowledging sodomy as legal, the Ohio General Assembly made no effort to overturn these decisions or enact a new law over the following decades. However, the Ohio cities of Cincinnati, Dayton, and Columbus were some of the first to pass laws against "indecent behavior" in 1819, 1842, and 1848 respectively. Cincinnati and Dayton also passed laws in 1849 prohibiting "obscene publications and immoral plays", and Columbus passed a law in 1848 prohibiting men from cross dressing in women's clothing, and vice versa.

Ohio adopted its first sodomy law in 1885, stating that anyone who has "carnal copulation against nature, with another human being or with a beast," is guilty of sodomy, and when convicted, shall be imprisoned in a penitentiary for "not more than twenty years". This was revised to include fellatio (oral sex) in 1889. It applied to private, consensual activity as well, and led to police raids on "establishments with a known gay clientele". In April 1886, the Supreme Court of Ohio ruled in Foster et al v. State that sodomy, or "copulation against nature", required the presence of a male, meaning that lesbian sexual activity was exempt from prosecution and thus legal, whereas homosexual and heterosexual sodomy were both punished by up to 20 years' imprisonment.

A 1906 text on state law stated that sodomy could be committed "between two human beings, as between two men, a man and a woman, a man and a boy, a man and a girl, two boys or a boy and a girl where of that age when capable of the crime". Over the following years, numerous court cases dealt with the issue of sodomy, including one in 1915, where a man was sent to the State Reformatory for having engaged in masturbation. In 1929, Ohio law was changed to make sodomy, said to include "any form of unnatural copulation", an offense without possibility of parole. In 1939, the Ohio General Assembly passed a "psychopathic offender" law, under which those convicted of sodomy could be sentenced to life in a mental health institution and were not permitted to be released, even if they were "cured", until the expiration of the minimum term for which, if he or she had been imprisoned, the prisoner would be eligible for parole. An appellate court, ruling in 1944 in State v. Forquer, held that cunnilingus fell out of the sodomy statute's scope. In 1945, State v. Walhenmaier, an Ohio Circuit Court stated that sodomy could be "evidenced by medical examination results".

A landmark 1957 case (Johnston v. Johnston) resulted in married couples being exempt from prosecution for sodomy: "the private moral relationship between husband and wife are concerned (as to either cunnilingus or fellation [sic],) it is certainly one that rests entirely in the minds of the two of them"; Ohio being the first state in the U.S. to do so. Ohioans were also subscribing to ONE magazine in record numbers, and others were collating in drinking establishments such as lesbian bars. In 1963, Ohio adopted a sex offender registry law, which "disproportionately affected" the LGBTQ community in the state. One year prior, police in Mansfield, Ohio had arrested men in a bathroom they "found having sex" and spied on others who "simply stopped to use the restroom" with a hidden camera. The United States Supreme Court declined to hear appeals for sodomy convictions in Mansfield, Ohio in Poyer v. Mayer (1964) and Chamberlain v. Ohio (1966).

In 1972, Ohio became the eighth state to repeal its sodomy statute. Nevertheless, it remained a misdemeanor to express romantic or sexual interest to another person of the same sex, even though Ohio was "one of the earliest states to decriminalize homosexuality". The law was part of a criminal code which was the first in the U.S. to have "gender-neutral sexual assault laws". There were also successful challenges to laws aimed against cross dressing in the state, beginning in the 1970s.

The Ohio Supreme Court, in 1974, upheld the refusal of the Ohio Secretary of State, arguing that the promotion of homosexuality as a valid lifestyle is contrary to the public policy of this state", to deny the incorporation of Greater Cincinnati Gay Society for a nonprofit corporation, even though sodomy was no longer illegal. In 1979's State v. Phipps, the Supreme Court of Ohio narrowed the sodomy statute's provision to cover only cases in which the proposition was "unwelcome". In a somewhat related case, in August 1997, Lambda Legal filed a friend-of-the-court legal brief in support of Jimmy Bird, in Ohio v. Bird, a HIV-positive man "convicted of committing assault with a deadly weapon" after accused of "spitting at a police officer" and spreading HIV. In May 1998, the Ohio Supreme Court affirmed the conviction but did not reach issue on "whether HIV can be transmitted via saliva."

The broad discriminatory nature of the application of Ohio's law was illustrated in State v. Thompson. In 1999, Eric Thompson had made a sexual pass at a jogger and, after the jogger declined, continued on his way. The jogger contacted the police, however, and Thompson was arrested and sentenced to 6 months in jail. In December 2000, the Ohio Eleventh District Court of Appeals reluctantly upheld the trial court decision. In its decision, the Ohio Eleventh rules that it was not clear why the law only applied to "same sex solicitation and not to opposite sex solicitation" and argued it was "inherently inconsistent for the Ohio legislature to now criminalize homosexual solicitation after it has chosen to decriminalize homosexual conduct between consenting adults."

In May 2002, the Supreme Court of Ohio unanimously overturned Thompson's conviction, writing that the law was "facially invalid" under the Fourteenth Amendment to the United States Constitution and Section 2, Article I of the Ohio Constitution. As part of a 2003 overhaul to the Sex Offender Registration and Notification Law (SORN), Ohio repealed its anti-gay importuning law. Apart from this case, other litigation which affected LGBTQ people in Ohio included Gajovski v. Gajovski (1991) and Equality Foundation of Greater Cincinnati v. City of Cincinnati (1994). On June 26, 2003, the United States Supreme Court ruled in Lawrence v. Texas to abolish all remaining sodomy laws and statutes nationwide.

== Recognition of same-sex relationships ==
Map of Ohio counties, cities, and villages that offer marriage and/or domestic partner benefits either county-wide or in particular cities. City or village offers marriage and/or domestic partner benefits Marriage and/or county-wide partner benefits through domestic partnership Marriage only. County, city, or village does not offer domestic partner benefits

=== Marriage ===
In 2003, Representative Bill Seitz introduced the Defense of Marriage Act in the state House of Representatives in 2003. It passed the House by a vote of 73–23 in December 2003 and the Senate in an 18–15 vote in January 2004. It was opposed by eleven Democrats and four Republicans in the Senate. Governor Bob Taft signed the legislation on February 6, 2004. The legislation was enacted in the aftermath of the Goodridge decision on November 18, 2003 in Massachusetts. Ballot Issue 1 of 2004 was a constitutional amendment initiated by the General Assembly and approved by a margin of 61%–38%. It amended Article XV, Section 11 of the Ohio Constitution to define marriage as being between "a man and a woman", thus excluding same-sex couples.

The amendment was supported by the groups Ohio Campaign to Protect Marriage and the Traditional Marriage Crusade, and opposed by the group Ohioans for Fairness. Additionally, both Governor Taft and Representative Bill Seitz opposed the amendment on the grounds that it was too vague. These laws came at the same time other states passed similar measures in voter referendums. The LGBTQ rights organization Equality Ohio was founded in response to the passage of Issue 1. The amendment was criticized by legal scholar Wilson Huhn as unconstitutional because it violated "the fundamental right of marriage" and creates "different rules for different people", while enacting opinions against same-sex marriage into law and does not affect opposite-sex and same-sex couples equally. In 2009, constitutional law scholar Tiffany G. Graham noted there was "inherent ambiguity...built into the amendment", and the executive director of Equality Ohio, Sue Doerfer, stated in 2017 that the amendment "legitimized discrimination" against same-sex couples in the state and "adversely" affected gay people.

In July 2007, the Ohio Supreme Court ruled in Ohio v. Carswell that Issue 1 amendment did not effect the state's domestic violence law. Following the decision, Metro Weekly argued that the decision was a "small victory" even though Issue 1 amendment remained in place, and constitutional law expert Marc Spindelman criticized the legal strategy of Lambda Legal in the case. Constitutional law scholar Tiffany G. Graham argued that the court's decision limited the amendment's reach only to same-sex marriage and civil unions, but failed when determining who had legal status, and erred in not declaring the amendment unconstitutional. In April 2014, Judge Timothy Black declared Ohio's ban on same-sex marriage unconstitutional and stated that Ohio was required to recognize same-sex marriages from other jurisdictions.

On June 26, 2015, the United States Supreme Court ruled in Obergefell v. Hodges that Ohio (along with Michigan, Kentucky and Tennessee) could not deny same-sex couples the right to marry, or refuse to recognize their marriages performed elsewhere; protected under the Fourteenth Amendment to the United States Constitution. This ruling reversed a November 2014 decision by the United States Court of Appeals for the Sixth Circuit, effectively legalizing same-sex marriage in those states and nationwide. This ruling also invalidated the Issue 1 amendment to Ohio's Constitution. Same-sex marriage has been legal in Ohio since June 2015.

=== Domestic partnerships and custody ===
Presently, several jurisdictions in the U.S. state of Ohio, such as the village of Yellow Springs, and the counties of Cuyahoga and Franklin, have established domestic partnerships for same-sex couples. The fate of these partnerships remains uncertain since marriage has become available to all couples.

In November 2007, Ohio legislator Tom Brinkman and Alliance Defending Freedom declined to appeal their lawsuit against the domestic partner benefits program of Miami University to Ohio Supreme Court, following a dismissal of the lawsuit by the Ohio Court of Appeals in August 2007 and Butler County Court of Common Pleas in November 2006. In the case of In the Matter of J.D. Fairchild, in December 2008, the Ohio Supreme Court affirmed the "enforceability of the court-approved custody agreement" between two lesbian parents, despite the Ohio amendment prohibiting same-sex marriage. This ruling was later used by Lambda Legal to support their defense of a lesbian parent in the case of In re S.J.L. and J.K.L.. The Ohio Court of Appeals ruled, in In re S.J.L. and J.K.L., in August 2010, that the state's 2004 constitutional amendment did not affect the ability of Ohio courts to "order shared custody between former same-sex partners".

In October 2010, the Ohio Court of Appeals sided with Lambda Legal in Cleveland Taxpayers v. Cleveland, retained the city's domestic partnership registry for "same-sex couples and their families". Scholar Daniel R. Pinello stated that the rulings in Cleveland Taxpayers v. Cleveland and In re S.J.L. and J.K.L. reinforced the message that those governments which violate Issue 1, and favor same-sex partners, will be sued. The Ohio Supreme Court, in July 2011, in the case of In the Matter of L.K.M. ruled 4-3 against a non-biological mother seeking "shared custody and visitation rights". Lambda Legal, which represented the mother in this case and in the partners In re S.J.L. and J.K.L., criticized the ruling as a "tragedy for the child" and said that all families in Ohio families should be "alarmed" by the decision.

=== Adoption and parenting ===
Currently, Ohio does not offer "second parent adoption" for unmarried couples, have LGBTQ-inclusive family leave laws, or recognize parents using assisted production, but does recognize "de facto parents".

Ohio permits single LGBT individuals, as well as married same-sex couples to adopt. Lesbian couples have access to assisted reproduction services such as in vitro fertilization. State law recognizes the non-genetic, non-gestational mother as a legal parent to a child born via donor insemination, but only if the parents are married. While there are no specific surrogacy laws in Ohio, the courts have ruled that the practice is legal and surrogacy contracts can be recognized as legally valid. Both gestational and traditional contracts are recognized, though the latter may result in potential legal conflicts and more litigation than the former. The state treats different-sex and same-sex couples equally under the same terms and conditions.

== Discrimination protections ==
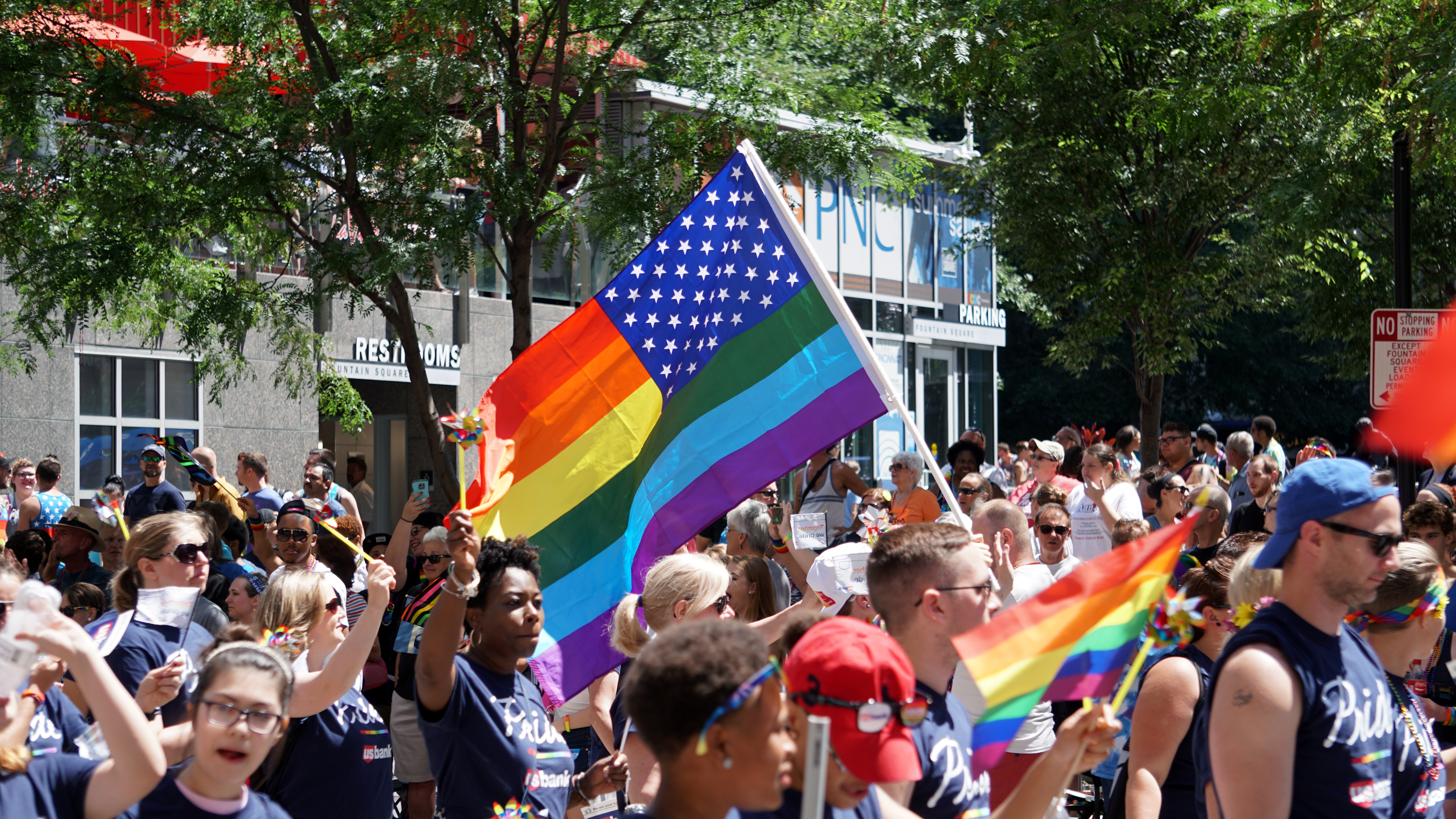
2017 Cincinnati Pride parade

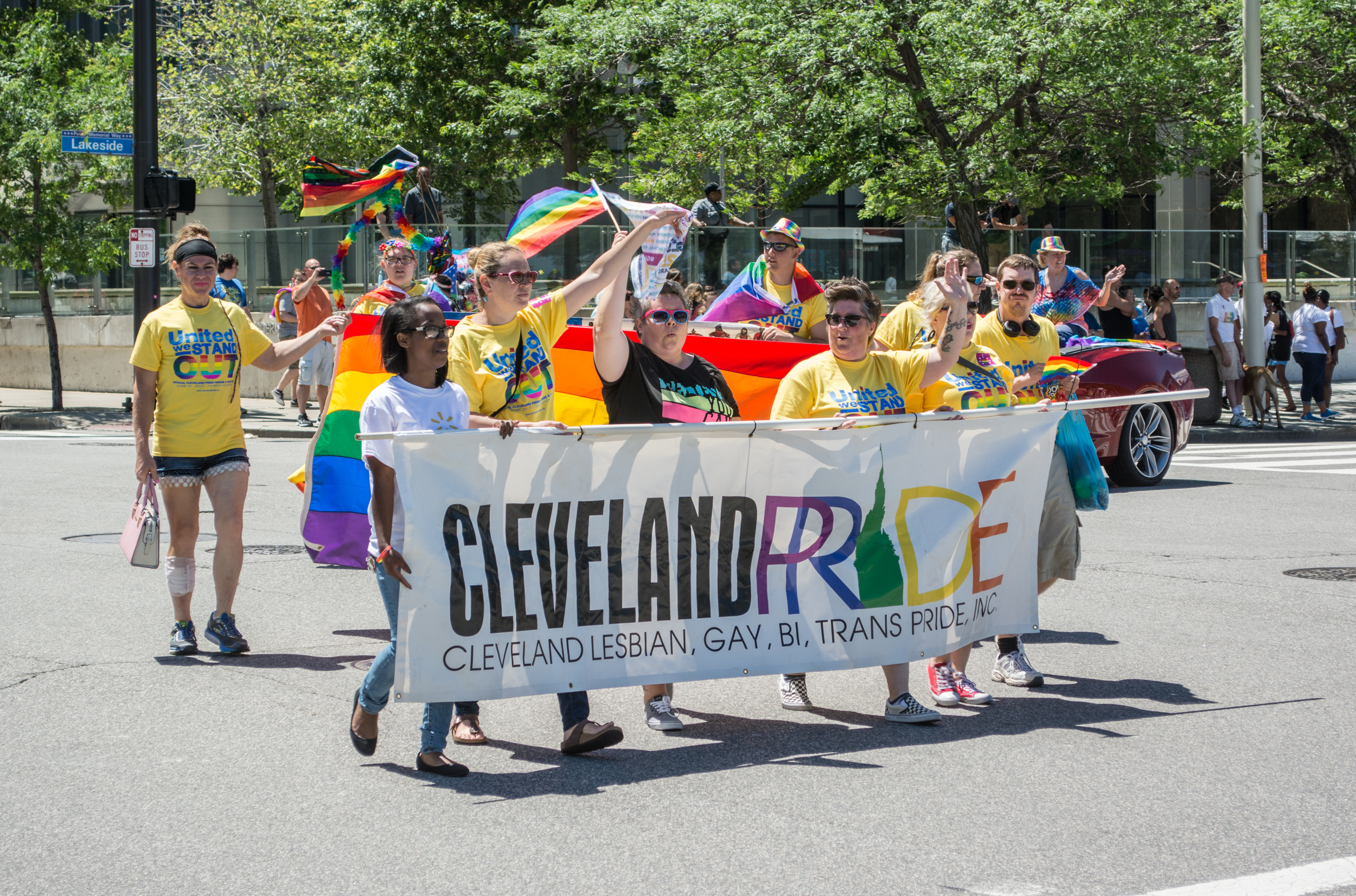
Cleveland Pride parade 2017

Ohio state statutes do not address discrimination on account of sexual orientation and gender identity. Discrimination based on sexual orientation is prohibited in state employment under an executive order issued by Governor John Kasich on January 21, 2011. He issued a new executive order on December 19, 2018 to include gender identity or expression, in one of his last actions as governor.

In January 1974, Columbus, Ohio, passed a law protecting "housing and public accommodations" rights for homosexuals. Ohio also prohibited sexual orientation discrimination in state employment in 1983. In October 1998, the United States Supreme Court declined to hear a case about a ballot measure which repealed the anti-discrimination law in Cincinnati, even though litigation challenging anti-LGBTQ employment discrimination in the state later failed.

On March 7, 2018, the United States Court of Appeals for the Sixth Circuit (covering Kentucky, Michigan, Ohio and Tennessee) ruled that discrimination on the basis of transgender status is tantamount to discrimination on the basis of "sex", as defined by Title VII of the Civil Rights Act of 1964. It also ruled that employers may not use the Religious Freedom Restoration Act to justify discrimination against LGBTQ people. Aimee Stephens, a transgender woman from Michigan, began working for a funeral home and presented as male. In 2013, she told her employer that she was transgender and planned to transition. She was promptly fired by her employer. The court held that the dismissal was discriminatory and violated federal law. An appeal to the case was heard by the Supreme Court in the 2019 term, concurrently to Bostock v. Clayton County and Altitude Express, Inc. v. Zarda, under R.G. & G.R. Harris Funeral Homes Inc. v. Equal Employment Opportunity Commission. On June 15, 2020, the U.S. Supreme Court ruled that discrimination in the workplace on the basis of sexual orientation or gender identity is discrimination on the basis of sex, and Title VII therefore protects LGBT employees from discrimination.

33 Ohio cities and counties presently have anti-discrimination ordinances prohibiting discrimination on the basis of sexual orientation and gender identity in employment, housing and public accommodations. Gambier, Golf Manor, Reynoldsburg, University Heights, and Portsmouth passed ordinances to this effect in 2020. Previously, in 2019, Worthington, Westerville, and Medina, passed similar laws. In 2017 and 2018, similar ordinances passed in Akron, Athens, Oxford, Kent, Beachwood, South Euclid, Sandusky, Youngstown, Olmsted Falls, and Cuyahoga County. Prior to this, Lakewood passed a similar law in 2016, as did Newark and Cleveland, Bexley in 2015, and Yellow Springs in 1979. Hilliard, Columbus, Springfield, Toledo Shaker Heights, Bowling Green, Cleveland Heights, Coshocton, Dayton, Cincinnati, and East Cleveland have similar laws on the books.

Canton bans unfair discrimination against LGBTQ people in employment and housing, but in not public accommodations, and Oberlin only does so in housing. Other jurisdictions, specifically Amberley, Brook Park, Cuyahoga Heights, Euclid, Garfield Heights, Linndale, Lorain, Maple Heights, Newburgh Heights, North Olmsted, Oberlin, Reminderville, Sheffield Lake, Steubenville, Warrensville Heights and Wickliffe, ban discrimination based on sexual orientation in housing. Wood county, the cities of Dublin, Gahanna, Hamilton, and Lima, and the village of Laura, have protections but only for city/county employees only. In January 2023, Human Rights Campaign gave Ohio, and 23 other states, the highest rating, of "High Priority to Achieve Basic Equality". The HRC also stated that cities in Ohio are leaders in "LGBTQ-friendly policy and legislation" nationwide.

== Freedom of expression ==
In 2012, 16-year-old high school student Maverick Couch, represented by Lambda Legal, sued the Waynesville Local School District after being told he could not come to school wearing a T-shirt with the words "Jesus is not a homophobe". The school board argued that they had the "right to limit clothing with sexual slogans...in order to protect its students and enhance the educational environment" and stated that the school principal, Randy Gebhardt, had the authority to request that remove his T-shirt and refrain from wearing it. The suit ended in a judgement in federal court in Cincinnati agreed to by all parties to the suit that affirmed Couch's right to wear the shirt to school and ordered the school district to pay $20,000 in damages and legal fees. Upon the announcement of the decision, Lambda Legal attorney Christopher Clark stated that the ruling provided that "First Amendment rights apply to all students on every day of the year" and that efforts to "silence LGBT youth will not go unchallenged."

=== Schools parental notification law ===
On January 8, 2025, Governor DeWine signed Ohio House Bill 8 into law. The bill requires educators, counselors, and other school staff to out LGBTQ students to their parents. It also bans "sexual content" from curriculum for Kindergarten through 3rd grade, mandates "age-appropriate" content for all other grades, and provides parents with the option to "opt out" of lessons involving such content. It includes "gender ideology" in the definition of "sexual content", but does not clarify what kinds of material may be considered "gender ideology". The vast majority of public testimony was in opposition to the bill.

== Transgender rights ==
=== Bathrooms ===
On November 27, 2024, Governor Mike DeWine signed Senate Bill 104 into law, which bans transgender students from using sex-segregated facilities such as bathrooms, locker rooms, and overnight accommodations. The bill includes an exception that allows transgender students to use single-occupancy restrooms with controlled use. The bill may be challenged for violating Ohio's single-subject law, since Senate Bill 104 also contains legislation regarding college credit for high school students. LGBTQ+ rights groups in the state, such as ACLU of Ohio and Equality Ohio, released statements saying they will continue to oppose the bill, while Republican representatives in the state's legislature thanked DeWine for signing the bill into law.

=== Birth certificates ===
There are procedures for changing name and gender on an Ohio birth certificate.

Following a 1987 court case, In re Ladrach, Ohio did not allow persons born in the state to amend the gender marker on their birth certificate following sex reassignment surgery. This policy was revised in 2016. In March 2018, four transgender Ohioans sued the Department of Health, seeking to have In re Ladrach overruled and be issued birth certificates reflecting their gender identity. At the time the lawsuit was filed, and supported by ACLU and Lambda Legal, Ohio was one of just three states where transgender people were banned from amending their birth certificates. Following such legal challenges, like in Ray v. McCloud in December 2020, federal judge Michael H. Watson invalidated it as unconstitutional. After June 1, 2021, Ohio, officially and legally, allowed transgender individuals to update their birth certificate, as the Ohio Department of Health did not appeal Watson's ruling. However, some counties continue to refuse birth corrections for transgender individuals.

=== Driver's licenses ===
Transgender people can change their legal name and gender on their driver's license or other ID card. In order for them to do so, they must submit to the Bureau of Motor Vehicles a court order certifying the name change and/or a "Declaration of Gender Change" form signed by a physician, nurse practitioner, social worker, therapist or psychologist certifying the applicant's gender identity. Since April 2022, Ohio driver's licenses offer an "X" option alongside "M" and "F".

In August 2026, the Ohio BMV announced a new policy and updated rules allowing only male or female markers, and requiring a birth certificate or passport that has an exact matching sex and name listed on it.

=== Gender-affirming healthcare ===
In 1975, an assembly worker at the Lordstown, Ohio, plant for General Motors (GM) took leave to undergo gender-affirming surgery (GAS), also known as sex reassignment surgery (SRS) or gender confirmation surgery (GCS), and returned to work as Joni Christian, confronting hostile co-workers and supervisors. Christian later sued GM for invasion of her privacy and won a "satisfactory settlement". The Washington Post reported, in July 2019, that officials from Ohio were not following policies that excluded Medicaid coverage for SRS, but it was "not...in writing yet." In October 2021, Ohio representatives Gary Click and Diane Grendell introduced a law that would have prohibited GAS for minors, along with Medicaid coverage and public money toward healthcare providers which conduct GAS. The law was opposed by groups including the Ohio Counseling Association, Equality Ohio, TransOhio, Human Rights Campaign and Ohio Senator Nickie Antonio, while the Center for Christian Virtue and Family Research Council supported the measure. The bill received five hearings and was assigned to the Ohio House Committee on Families, Aging, and Human Services.

In November 2022, the Ohio House Committee on Family, Aging, and Human services, heard a bill to outlaw hormone therapy, puberty blockers, and gender-affirming surgeries for minors. The bill also mandated that any other forms of gender affirming care or counseling only be given after a two-year long screening period, in which any comorbidities, defined to include anxiety, depression, ADHD, and autism, had to be "treated and stabilized" for an additional two years, and would mandate what some have described as "a type of registry" for trans kids, in which the exact name of the patient would not be included, but other identifying details would that would make it possible to identify the trans child.

==== Restrictions on youth care ====
On December 13, 2023, the Ohio Legislature passed the Saving Adolescents from Experimentation (SAFE) Act (HB68), mostly along party lines. It bans gender affirming puberty blockers, hormones, and surgery for people under 18 On December 29, Governor Mike DeWine vetoed the bill, but on January 5, 2024, DeWine signed into law an executive order banning gender affirming surgeries for minors. On January 10, 2024, the Ohio House overrode his veto of HB68, and the Senate passed the bill into law via override on January 24.

In April 2024, a judge blocked the legislation on banning gender-affirming healthcare for children and minors (based on a technicality and the one subject rule on bills) - from going into effect on April 24, 2024. In August 2024, a court overturned the injunction after finding "the regulation of transgender individuals" to be a legitimate state interest, allowing the legislation to go into effect. On March 18, 2025, the state's 10th District Court of Appeals reversed the judge's decision, reinstating the injunction. State Attorney General Dave Yost immediately vowed to appeal.

==== Dropped restrictions on adult care ====
On January 5, 2024, DeWine announced new rules regarding access to care for adults. These rules require trans patients accessing gender affirming healthcare to first:

- Receive continual psychiatric counseling in perpetuity, with a psychiatrist with prior experience in the treatment transgender people of the relevant age group.
- Maintain a consistent relationship with an endocrinologist with prior relevant experience.
- Have their treatment plan approved by a bioethicist, including a detailed plan for the event of detransition.

Additionally, if the patient is under 21 years of age:

- They must receive at least six months of comprehensive mental health evaluation, to be detailed in the patient's medical records.

The rules also require that all healthcare providers in Ohio report cases of gender dysphoria to the state within 30 days.

In February 2024, DeWine's administration dropped all of the proposed rules to restrict treatment for transgender adults after receiving backlash from trans people and healthcare providers.

=== Political candidacy ===
In January 2024, Vanessa Joy, a transgender candidate running for the Ohio state house, was stripped from the ballot under a law described by The Hill as "little known" and "seldom enforced", requiring her to disclose her deadname (a former name that does not align with one's gender identity) on her signature petition, even after a legal name change. The petition paperwork does not have a place to note any former names, and there are also some exceptions to the Ohio law, including for candidates who had a name change after a marriage. Later that month, NBC News reported that three out of the four transgender candidates running for state offices had been challenged or disqualified; one candidate set to be disqualified was later allowed to run, while another was only allowed to run under his deadname, since he had not legally changed his name.

=== Sports ===
On December 13, 2023, the Ohio Legislature passed the Saving Adolescents from Experimentation (SAFE) Act (HB68), mostly along party lines. Measures include banning transgender girls and women from playing on women's sports teams in high school and college. On December 29, Governor Mike DeWine vetoed the bill. The Ohio House overrode his veto of HB68, and the Senate passed the bill into law via override on January 24, 2024.

== Conversion therapy ==
In February 2015, a bill to prohibit the use of conversion therapy on LGBT minors in Ohio was introduced by Senator Charleta Tavares, who had introduced a similar bill in October 2013 The bill died without any legislative action. In April 2016, Tavares testified against conversion therapy, arguing that LGBTQ youth should not be subject to "treatments that reinforce...futile and obsolete practices". In their 2018 scorecard about LGBTQ issues and the Ohio legislature, Equality Ohio called for a state-wide ban on conversion therapy to prevent "great mental, emotional, spiritual, and physical harm to young people" and noted their role in advocating for bans on conversion therapy "in several Ohio cities". In November 2018, Tavares criticized the Ohio General Assembly for "inaction" on the issue. In 2021, Ohio legislators Mary Lightbody, Nickie Antonio, and Tina Maharath introduced bills in the Ohio General Assembly to ban conversion therapy, but the efforts stalled. A similar bill was introduced in February 2020 by Rep. Lightbody.

Seven Ohio cities have banned conversion therapy on minors, but there is no state law or policy on conversion therapy, according to the Movement Advancement Project. In December 2015, Cincinnati banned the practice, followed by Toledo, Columbus, Dayton, and Athens in 2017. Lakewood and Kent banned the practice in 2018. Cleveland, Cleveland Heights, Akron, and Reynoldsburg legally banned conversion therapy in 2022.

== Public opinion ==
A 2017 Public Religion Research Institute (PRRI) opinion poll found that 61% of Ohioans supported same-sex marriage, while 33% opposed it and 6% were unsure. The same poll found that 69% of Ohioans supported an anti-discrimination law covering sexual orientation and gender identity. 25% were opposed. Furthermore, 60% were against allowing public businesses to refuse to serve LGBTQ people due to religious beliefs, while 34% supported allowing such religiously-based refusals.

An October 2024 poll by Baldwin Wallace University in Ohio found that 60% of registered voters in Ohio supported schools teaching 6th-12th grade students about sexual orientation but only 43% supported teaching students in those same grades about gender identity. Additionally, the poll found that 51% of voters in Ohio believe parents should not have direct control over what books are in the school library and 55% believe that parents should not be able to stop schools from teaching topics that they do not like. The poll also found that 72% of voters in Ohio would oppose policies or laws allowing medical professionals to provide someone younger than 18 with medical care for a gender transition and 73% would oppose policies or laws allowing transgender athletes to play on the team that matches their gender identity and 56% would support policies or laws requiring public schools to notify parents if it is discovered that a student identifies with a gender that does not align with their biological sex.

Public opinion for LGBTQ anti-discrimination laws in Ohio
Poll source	Date(s) administered	Sample size	Margin of error	% support	% opposition	% no opinion
Public Religion Research Institute	January 2-December 30, 2019	2,160	?	71%	23%	6%
Public Religion Research Institute	January 3-December 30, 2018	2,065	?	68%	26%	6%
Public Religion Research Institute	April 5-December 23, 2017	2,750	?	69%	25%	6%
Public Religion Research Institute	April 29, 2015-January 7, 2016	3,349	?	69%	26%	5%

== Summary table ==
Same-sex sexual activity legal	Yes (Since 1974)
Equal age of consent	Yes
Anti-discrimination laws for sexual orientation	No / Yes (In employment; otherwise varies by city or county for housing and public accommodations)
Anti-discrimination laws for gender identity	No / Yes (In employment; otherwise varies by city or county for housing and public accommodations)
Same-sex marriages	Yes (Since 2015)
Stepchild adoption by same-sex couples	Yes (Since 2015)
Joint adoption by same-sex couples	Yes (Since 2015)
Lesbian, gay and bisexual people allowed to serve openly in the military	Yes (Since 2011)
Transgender people allowed to serve openly in the military	Yes / No (Most transgender personnel allowed to serve openly since 2021)
Transgender people allowed to serve openly in the military	No
Intersex people allowed to serve openly in the military	/ Yes (Current DoD policy bans "hermaphrodites" from serving or enlisting in the military)
Conversion therapy banned on minors	No / Yes (Some cities only)
Right to change sex on a birth certificate	No (Banned since 2024)
Equal access to IVF for lesbian couples	Yes
Surrogacy arrangements legal for gay male couples	Yes
MSMs allowed to donate blood	Yes (Since 2023)

== See also ==
- Politics of Ohio
- LGBT rights in the United States
- Rights and responsibilities of marriages in the United States
- Equality Ohio
- Law of Ohio
