= Bill Roemer =

American politician (born 1956)

Member of the Ohio House of Representatives from the 31st district
- Incumbent
- Assumed office January 6, 2019
- Preceded by: Marilyn Slaby

Personal details
- Born: August 21, 1956 (age 70) Akron, Ohio, U.S.
- Party: Republican
- Education: Case Western Reserve University

William "Bill" Roemer (born August 21, 1956) is a member of the Ohio House of Representatives, since 2019, representing the 31st district. The district encompasses the majority of western and northern Summit county. A Republican, he is serving his fourth term in the House of Representatives. In 2026, he considered a run for the Ohio Senate but declined to enter the race, citing family reasons.

== Political positions and policy history ==
=== House Bill 6 and campaign contributions ===
Roemer’s vote on House Bill 6 (HB 6) and campaign contributions he received from donors associated with FirstEnergy were the subject of several news reports following the July 2020 arrest of former House Speaker Larry Householder. Roemer has not been accused of wrongdoing, was not identified by investigators, and has stated he had no knowledge of the alleged bribery scheme connected to HB 6. See Ohio FirstEnergy bribery scandal

In a July 2020 interview with Scriptype, Roemer said he had received campaign contributions from individuals connected to FirstEnergy and confirmed that he voted in favor of HB 6. He stated that he supported the legislation based on its policy goals and denied any involvement in or awareness of the conduct described in the federal complaint against Householder.

Official legislative records show that Roemer voted “yes” on HB 6 during its passage in the 133rd General Assembly.

Campaign finance filings from the Ohio Secretary of State show that Bill Roemer’s campaign committee received contributions from multiple political action committees during the 2018 election cycle. Filings show contributions from FirstEnergy Corp. PAC totaling $2,500 across multiple contributions between 2018 and 2019, as well as contributions totaling $2,000 from NiSource Inc. PAC and Duke Energy PAC. Additional filings list contributions from other industry and professional political action committees active in Ohio during that period.

Filings also show that the campaign received $10,221.85 in direct and in-kind contributions from Friends of Larry Householder during the 2018 election cycle. Householder was later convicted in connection with a $60 million bribery scheme tied to the passage of House Bill 6.

Following Householder’s arrest, the Ohio Capital Journal reviewed campaign finance filings and identified Roemer among several lawmakers who had received contributions from FirstEnergy executives or related political donors during the period when HB 6 was under consideration. The article did not report or suggest any criminal activity by Roemer.

In October 2020, Cleveland.com surveyed Northeast Ohio legislators who voted for HB 6 and reported each lawmaker’s public statements regarding the future of the law. Roemer was listed among the representatives who discussed revisiting aspects of HB 6 following the scandal.

Public commentary also referenced Roemer’s vote on HB 6. An opinion letter published in the Akron Beacon Journal listed Roemer among local officials who voted for HB 6.

A report by WOSU Public Media documented which Ohio legislators had received contributions from FirstEnergy and noted which lawmakers chose to donate those contributions to charity following the Householder arrest. The article listed Roemer among legislators who received such contributions but did not describe any improper conduct or state that he was asked to return them.

==== Campaign spending and political support ====
In reporting following the July 2020 arrest of former Ohio House Speaker Larry Householder, Cleveland.com identified Roemer as one of the candidates recruited by Householder as part of a group commonly referred to as “Team Householder.” According to the report, Householder and allied political organizations focused significant financial and organizational resources on electing this slate of candidates during the 2018 Ohio House elections. The article described how Householder-aligned political groups directed substantial outside spending and coordinated campaign support across multiple targeted races, including Roemer’s, as part of an effort to secure a supportive majority in the Ohio House. This spending occurred alongside the direct campaign contributions to Roemer that are documented in campaign finance filings and reported elsewhere.

Federal prosecutors later described a broader network of political spending tied to the passage of House Bill 6. In a deferred prosecution agreement, FirstEnergy acknowledged that approximately $60 million was paid to a nonprofit entity linked to Householder to support political activities, including efforts to elect candidates aligned with his leadership and to secure passage of HB 6. Reporting by Cleveland.com and other outlets has described how this spending was deployed across multiple legislative races during the 2018 election cycle, including those involving candidates associated with “Team Householder.”

=== Abortion legislation ===
In 2019, Roemer voted in favor of Ohio Senate Bill 23, commonly referred to as the "Heartbeat Bill," which prohibits abortions once a fetal heartbeat is detectable, typically around six weeks into pregnancy. The legislation does not include exceptions for rape or incest and was signed into law by Governor Mike DeWine on April 11, 2019. In October 2024, Ohio's six-week abortion ban law was permanently struck down by a Hamilton County judge.

=== School nutrition and education funding ===
In 2023, Representative Bill Roemer voted in favor of Ohio's biennial budget (HB 33), which excluded provisions for universal free school meals. The budget did expand access to free lunches for students who previously qualified for reduced-price meals, but it fell short of covering all public school children regardless of income. Roemer's vote aligned with Ohio GOP leaders, who opposed universal meal funding on the grounds of cost and scope.

=== Law enforcement symbolism legislation ===
In 2023, Roemer voted for Ohio House Bill 100 (135th GA), which prohibits landlords, condominium associations, and homeowners’ associations from banning the display of the "thin blue line" flag. Supporters, including law enforcement groups, have described the flag as a tribute to police service and sacrifice. Critics argue that the flag has also become associated with division and extremist politics, noting its use during the January 6 Capitol attack and its adoption by some white supremacist groups. The legislation was part of a wider debate in Ohio, where civil liberties groups such as the ACLU argued that HB 100 created special protections for one symbol and raised First Amendment concerns. Local outlets also reported on lawmakers’ efforts to advance bills expanding protections for the display of the flag in residential communities.

=== Bathroom and facility access legislation ===
Roemer voted in favor of Ohio House Bill 68, which bans gender-affirming medical care for minors and restricts transgender girls from participating in female school sports. The bill was vetoed by Governor Mike DeWine in December 2023 and subsequently enacted after the Ohio General Assembly overrode the veto in January 2024.

In 2024, Roemer supported Ohio Senate Bill 104, known as the "Protect All Students Act." The law requires multi-occupancy restrooms, locker rooms, changing rooms, and overnight accommodations in public K–12 schools and higher education institutions to be designated based on sex assigned at birth. Governor DeWine signed the bill into law on November 27, 2024, and it took effect on February 25, 2025.

=== Transgender legislation and related events ===
In January 2024, Roemer's stepdaughter, Vanessa Joy, a transgender woman, was disqualified from running for the Ohio House of Representatives after the Summit County Board of Elections ruled that her petitions were invalid because they did not include her former legal name, as required under Ohio election law.

The case drew broader attention because other candidates in Ohio had been allowed to run without including former names, raising concerns about inconsistent enforcement of election law. Joy publicly criticized Roemer for supporting legislation restricting transgender rights, while also stating that they have not had a personal relationship.

=== 2024 polling place incident ===
On November 5, 2024, during the general election, Roemer was involved in an incident at a polling place in Cuyahoga Falls, Ohio. According to reports, Roemer was accused of causing a disturbance and yelling at an 82-year-old poll worker. Law enforcement documents indicated that Roemer was "disrespectful" and created a scene at the polling location. The incident was reported to local authorities, and Roemer later addressed the situation publicly.

=== Committee assignments ===
As of June 2026, Roemer serves on the following committees in the Ohio House.

- Ways and Means (chair)
- Finance
- Medicaid
- Public Insurance and Pensions

== Education and career ==
Roemer has a Bachelor of Science degree in accounting from Case Western Reserve University, where he graduated summa cum laude. He also earned a Master of Business Administration degree from the Weatherhead School of Management of Case Western Reserve University. He is a former instructor of finance at Myers University.

Roemer is a retired AT&T sales director and a Certified Public Accountant, who previously worked in regulatory accounting. Rep Roemer is married to Josie Roemer, a member of Summit ESC, and resides in Richfield with his family.

== Links ==
- Representative Bill Roemer (official site)
