= Domestic partnership in Ohio =

Several jurisdictions in the U.S. state of Ohio have established domestic partnerships for same-sex couples. The fate of these partnerships remains uncertain since marriage has become available to all couples.

== Local level ==
Map of Ohio counties, cities, and villages that offer domestic partner benefits either county-wide or in particular cities. Note: Map may not list all current localities. City or village offers domestic partner benefits County-wide partner benefits through domestic partnership County, city, or village does not offer domestic partner benefits

=== Columbus ===
In December 1998, the Columbus City Council approved benefits for domestic partners, then two months later unanimously repealed them after residents threatened a referendum.

On July 30, 2012, the Columbus City Council approved benefits for domestic partners. It went into effect on August 29, 2012.

=== Cleveland Heights ===
On April 15, 2002, the Cleveland Heights City Council approved, by a 6–1 vote, of a domestic partnership registry for cities employees. It went into effect on May 15, 2002.

On November 4, 2003, voters in Cleveland Heights approved Issue 35, which created a municipal domestic partnership registry in the city. The domestic partnership registry went into effect on January 26, 2004.

=== Toledo ===
On November 13, 2007, the Toledo City Council approved, by a 10–2 vote, of a domestic partnership registry in the city. On November 21, 2007, Mayor Carty Finkbeiner signed it into law. It went into effect on December 21, 2007.

=== Cleveland ===
On December 8, 2008, the Cleveland City Council approved, by a 13–7 vote, of a domestic partnership registry in the city. On December 10, 2008, Mayor Frank G. Jackson signed it into law. It went into effect on April 9, 2009.

=== Yellow Springs ===
On September 8 and September 21, 2009, the Yellow Springs Village Council voted 5–0 in favor of a domestic partnership registry in the city.

=== Franklin County ===
On August 18, 2009, the Franklin County commissioners approved of a domestic partnership registry in the county. It went into effect on January 1, 2010.

=== Athens ===
On July 1, 2011, the Athens City Council approved of a domestic partnership registry in the city. It went into effect on June 16, 2011.

=== Dayton ===
On May 2, 2012, the Dayton City Council unanimously approves of a domestic partnership registry in the city. It went into effect on June 1, 2012.

=== Cincinnati ===
On May 2, 2012, the Cincinnati City Council approved, by an 8–1 vote, of a domestic partnership registry in the city. It went into effect on June 1, 2012.

=== Cuyahoga County ===
On February 14, 2012, the Cuyahoga County Council approved, by a 6–4 vote, of a domestic partnership registry in the county.

=== Oberlin ===
On September 21, 2012, the Oberlin City Council unanimously approves of a domestic partnership registry in the city. It went into effect on October 17, 2012.

=== Lakewood ===
In October 2013, the city of Lakewood said it would extend domestic partnerships benefits in the city in 2014.

== See also ==
- LGBT rights in Ohio
- Same-sex marriage in Ohio
