= Same-sex marriage in Ohio =

Same-sex marriage has been legal in Ohio since the U.S. Supreme Court's ruling in Obergefell v. Hodges striking down the state's statutory and constitutional bans on same-sex marriage on June 26, 2015. This lawsuit, named after lead plaintiff Jim Obergefell, was filed in the U.S. District Court for the Southern District of Ohio on July 19, 2013, challenging the denial of marriage rights to same-sex couples and asking Ohio to recognize marriages from other jurisdictions for the purpose of recording a spouse on a death certificate. Judge Timothy Black ruled that Ohio must recognize same-sex marriages from other jurisdictions. He stayed general enforcement of his ruling, but ordered the state to recognize out-of-state same-sex marriages for completing death certificates in all cases. Judge Black ruled in a second case, Henry v. Wymyslo, around the same time, ordering the state to recognize out-of-state same-sex marriages for the purpose of completing four birth certificates. Attorney General Mike DeWine appealed the rulings to the Sixth Circuit Court of Appeals, which consolidated the two cases and held oral arguments on August 6, 2014. That court upheld Ohio's ban on same-sex marriage on November 6, 2014. The U.S. Supreme Court overturned the decision and declared same-sex marriages legal in the United States in Obergefell on June 26, 2015. The first same-sex marriages in Ohio were performed shortly after the Supreme Court released its ruling, as local officials implemented the order.

Ohio had previously denied marriage rights to same-sex couples by statute and in its State Constitution since 2004. Polling suggests that a majority of Ohio residents support the legal recognition of same-sex marriage, with a 2022 poll from the Public Religion Research Institute showing that 70% of respondents supported same-sex marriage.

== Legal restrictions ==
=== Statutes ===
Prior to May 7, 2004, same-sex marriage was neither recognized nor prohibited in Ohio. On December 10, 2003, the Ohio House of Representatives passed the Defense of Marriage Act, by a 73–23 vote, banning same-sex marriage and "statutory benefits of legal marriage to nonmarital relationships", along with prohibiting state recognition of out-of-state same-sex marriages. The Senate passed the legislation by a 18–15 vote on January 21, 2004. On February 6, Governor Bob Taft signed it into law, and it took effect on May 7. The ban was struck down by the U.S. Supreme Court in Obergefell v. Hodges on June 26, 2015. Ohio's statutory prohibition on same-sex marriage, though unenforceable, remains on the books and has not been explicitly repealed. In 2023, representatives Jessica Miranda and Tavia Galonski introduced unsuccessful legislation to repeal the ban.

=== Constitutional amendment ===
On November 2, 2004, voters approved State Issue 1, an initiated constitutional amendment defining marriage as "a union between one man and one woman" and prohibiting any "legal status for relationships of unmarried individuals that intends to approximate the design, qualities, significance or effect of marriage" in the state of Ohio. The amendment passed by a vote of 61.7% in favor to 38.3% against. It went into effect on December 2, 2004. The provisions in the Constitution of Ohio prohibiting same-sex marriage have since been declared unconstitutional, but they have not been explicitly repealed.

In 2013, FreedomOhio and Equality Ohio sought state officials' approval for a ballot initiative to repeal the constitutional amendment and allow same-sex marriage. Two prominent Republicans, Senator Rob Portman and former Attorney General Jim Petro, gave their support to the campaign. However, no initiative was placed on the ballot. In 2024, activists announced they would push for a citizen-led ballot initiative to repeal the ban on same-sex marriages. Initially, this ballot measure would have both overturned the marriage ban and prohibited state and local governments from discriminating based on "race, color, creed or religion, sex, sexual orientation, gender identity or expression regardless of sex assigned at birth, pregnancy status, genetic information, disease status, age, disability, recovery status, familial status, ancestry, national origin or military and veteran status". However, the Ohio Ballot Board split the initiative into two on July 9, 2025—one to repeal the marriage ban and the other to ban discrimination. Representative Terrence Upchurch criticized the decision to split the initiative, "It's one issue. It's cut and dry." An organizer for Ohio Equal Rights, a group created to campaign for the initiatives, said, "There's definitely political will for using trans people to divide Ohioans. The hopeful side of me appreciates that they are recognizing the support for same-sex marriage. That's great." Both initiatives, which were certified on August 8 by Attorney General Dave Yost, require collecting 442,958 signatures in order to appear before voters. In June 2026, Ohio Equal Rights announced it would try to get the measures placed on the November 2027 ballot.

== Lawsuits ==
Same-sex marriage in the United States

=== State cases ===
Lacking legal representation and support from the local LGBT community, a lesbian couple from Dayton sued the state in Thorton v. Timmers in 1974, after being denied a marriage license. In 1975, a state court denied their request for a license and concluded that "it is the express legislative intent that those persons who may be joined in marriage must be of different sexes." A similar case, Fullington v. Ohio, was brought by Russ Stalk and David Fullington in 1990, but dismissed by an Ohio county municipal court on October 11, 1990.

=== Obergefell v. Hodges ===
A Cincinnati same-sex couple filed a lawsuit, Obergefell v. Kasich, in the U.S. District Court for the Southern District of Ohio on July 19, 2013, alleging that the state discriminated against same-sex couples who had lawfully married out-of-state. The main plaintiff was Jim Obergefell, while the named-defendant was Governor John Kasich. On July 22, 2013, District Judge Timothy Black granted the couple's motion, temporarily restraining the vital statistics registrar from accepting any death certificate unless it recorded the deceased's status at death as "married" and his partner as "surviving spouse". On August 13, Black extended the temporary restraining order until the end of December. The case was restyled Obergefell v. Wymyslo on September 25, with Health Department Director Theodore Wymyslo as the named defendant. Funeral director Robert Grunn was added to the lawsuit so that he could obtain clarification of his legal obligations under Ohio law when serving clients with same-sex spouses. On December 23, Judge Black ruled that Ohio's refusal to recognize same-sex marriages from other jurisdictions was discriminatory and ordered Ohio to recognize same-sex marriages from other jurisdictions on death certificates. Black ruled in a similar case around the same time. In Henry v. Wymyslo, four same-sex couples legally married in other states sued to force the state to list both parents on their children's birth certificates. On April 14, 2014, Black ruled that Ohio must recognize same-sex marriages from other jurisdictions, and on April 16 stayed enforcement of his ruling except for the birth certificates sought by the plaintiffs. Attorney General Mike DeWine announced plans to appeal the decisions.

On May 20, the Sixth Circuit consolidated the two cases, now Obergefell v. Hodges with the appointment of Richard Hodges as the new director of the Ohio Department of Health, and on November 6 ruled 2–1 that Ohio's ban on same-sex marriage did not violate the Constitution of the United States. On January 16, 2015, the U.S. Supreme Court consolidated Obergefell with three other cases from Kentucky, Michigan and Tennessee, agreeing to review the case. After hearing oral arguments the following April, the court ruled on June 26, 2015, that Ohio's constitutional ban violated the Fourteenth Amendment of the U.S. Constitution on equal protection and due process grounds. The ruling meant that the earlier Sixth Circuit Court of Appeals decision was reversed, and same-sex couples began immediately marrying in the state. Governor Kasich said he was disappointed by the court ruling but stated, "They've made their decision and we just move on". DeWine said he would comply with the decision, "While Ohio argued that the Supreme Court should let this issue ultimately be decided by the voters, the Court has now made its decision." Senator Portman issued the following statement, "In 2013, I decided to support marriage equality after I came to understand this issue better in the context of my own family. I can't help but view today's Supreme Court decision through that same lens. And as a father, I welcome today's decision. As I have said before, I would have preferred for this issue to be resolved by the democratic process in the states because I think you build a more lasting consensus that way. Now the Court has reached its decision, I hope we can move past the division and polarization the issue has caused." The Mayor of Columbus, Michael B. Coleman, said, "I am pleased with the Supreme Court's decision to overturn the ban on same-sex marriage because it represents true equality for all, regardless of who they love." State Representative Nickie Antonio welcomed the ruling, "From this day forward, all families – including families like mine – have the opportunity to experience the full depth and breadth of constitutional equality and the freedom to celebrate the love that binds our family, and all families – including those of same sex couples."

Among the first same-sex couples to marry in Ohio were Roy Keith Garrett and Chris Richardson in Cleveland on June 26 just hours after the Supreme Court's ruling. Two more couples, Jamie Moore and Tim Scott, and Patricia Hanen and Elaine McCoy, were married just minutes later in the same city. Jimmie Beall and Mindy Ross, who had unsuccessfully applied for a license every Valentine's Day for the previous seven years, were the first same-sex couple to receive a marriage license in Columbus. Across the state, many couples rushed to their county courthouses in the hours after the court decision to apply for licenses, including in Dayton, Ironton, and Toledo. Mayor John Cranley officiated at the weddings of half a dozen same-sex couples on June 26 at Fountain Square in Cincinnati.

== Developments after legalization ==
On March 15, 2016, the Ohio Supreme Court ordered the use of gender-neutral references in family court cases, replacing terms such as "husband" and "wife". The directive applies to words like "father", "mother", "parent" and "spouse" in its description of terms expressing familial relationships, which cover areas including divorce, child support, guardianship, adoption and domestic violence. The order took effect the same day.

== Demographics and marriage statistics ==
Data from the 2000 U.S. census showed that 18,937 same-sex couples were living in Ohio. By 2005, this had increased to 30,669 couples, likely attributed to same-sex couples' growing willingness to disclose their partnerships on government surveys. Same-sex couples lived in all counties of the state and constituted 0.8% of coupled households and 0.4% of all households in the state. Most couples lived in Franklin, Cuyahoga and Hamilton counties, but the counties with the highest percentage of same-sex couples were Franklin (0.74% of all county households) and Delaware (0.55%). Same-sex partners in Ohio were on average younger than opposite-sex partners, and more likely to be employed. However, the average and median household incomes of same-sex couples were lower than different-sex couples, and same-sex couples were also far less likely to own a home than opposite-sex partners. 22% of same-sex couples in Ohio were raising children under the age of 18, with an estimated 11,950 children living in households headed by same-sex couples in 2005.

2018 estimates from the United States Census Bureau showed that there were about 32,900 same-sex households in Ohio. This represented an increase compared to 2017 (about 31,400 households), 2016 (about 27,600 households), 2015 (about 26,850 households) and 2014 (about 26,000 households). The Census Bureau estimated that 54.4% of same-sex couples living in the state in 2018 were married. The 2020 U.S. census showed that there were 17,986 married same-sex couple households (7,303 male couples and 10,683 female couples) and 17,654 unmarried same-sex couple households in Ohio.

== Public opinion ==
Public opinion for same-sex marriage in Ohio
Poll source	Dates administered	Sample size	Margin of error	Support	Opposition	Do not know / refused
Public Religion Research Institute	February 28 – December 8, 2025	877 adults	?	65%	32%	3%
Public Religion Research Institute	March 13 – December 2, 2024	846 adults	?	68%	28%	4%
Public Religion Research Institute	March 9 – December 7, 2023	879 adults	?	69%	29%	2%
Public Religion Research Institute	March 11 – December 14, 2022	?	?	70%	28%	2%
Public Religion Research Institute	March 8 – November 9, 2021	?	?	69%	30%	1%
Public Religion Research Institute	January 7 – December 20, 2020	1,894 adults	?	66%	30%	4%
Public Religion Research Institute	April 5 – December 23, 2017	2,750 adults	?	61%	33%	6%
Public Religion Research Institute	May 18, 2016 – January 10, 2017	4,074 adults	?	56%	35%	9%
Public Religion Research Institute	April 29, 2015 – January 7, 2016	3,349 adults	?	53%	40%	7%
Public Religion Research Institute	April 2, 2014 – January 4, 2015	2,041 adults	?	53%	39%	8%
New York Times/CBS News/YouGov	September 20 – October 1, 2014	?	?	45%	40%	15%
SurveyUSA	April 24–28, 2014	618 likely voters	± 4.0%	43%	49%	8%
Quinnipiac University	February 22–17, 2014	1,370 registered voters	± 2.7%	50%	44%	6%
Public Policy Polling	August 16–19, 2013	551 voters	± 4.2%	48%	42%	10%
The Washington Post	September 19–23, 2012	934 registered voters	± 4.0%	52%	37%	11%

A March 2013 Saperstein poll for The Columbus Dispatch revealed that 54% of Ohio residents surveyed supported a proposed amendment to repeal the state's 2004 constitutional ban on same-sex marriage. The August 2013 Public Policy Polling (PPP) survey found that 48% of respondents supported same-sex marriage, while 42% remained opposed and 10% said they were not sure. The organization also found that 69% of Ohio respondents supported either marriage (44%) or civil unions (25%) for same-sex couples, including a majority (54%) of Republican voters. 27% of respondents said that there should be no legal recognition of same-sex relationships.

== See also ==
- LGBT rights in Ohio
- Domestic partnership in Ohio
- Same-sex marriage in the United States
