= Brinkman v. Miami University =

Brinkman v. Miami University, et al. (2007 Ohio 4372) was a lawsuit filed by Ohio State Representative Tom Brinkman Jr. on November 22, 2005, against Miami University. Brinkman claimed Miami's same-sex partnership policy violated the ban on same-sex relationships added earlier that month to the Constitution of Ohio. It was dismissed for lack of standing.

== Lawsuit ==
Miami University, a public institution, began offering benefits, including health and dental insurance, ticket discounts and tuition remission to same-sex domestic partners of faculty and staff members in July 2004. In November 2004, Ohio voters passed the state Ohio State Issue 1, an amendment to the Ohio Constitution that banned recognition of same-sex unions "in... this state and its political subdivisions."

Brinkman, a Cincinnati Republican who had two children attending the university, filed a lawsuit in the Court of Common Pleas of Butler County on November 22, 2004. He was represented by the Alliance Defense Fund. Brinkman argued that by offering benefits to domestic partners of its employees the university had "created and recognized a legal status for relationships of unmarried individuals that intends to approximate the design, qualities, significance or effect of marriage." One report described the lawsuit as a test to determine "how far Ohio's ban extends beyond marriage". University President Jim Garland called the benefits "a critical component of Miami's compensation program" and noted that official description of marriage amendment that voters approved said that it "'does not interfere in any way with government benefits granted to persons in non-marital homosexual relationships, so long as the government does not grant those benefits to such persons specifically for the reason that the relationship is one that seeks to imitate marriage.'" Lambda Legal was allowed to intervene in the suit to defend the university's program.

David Langdon, a conservative activist who wrote language for the Marriage Amendment, called it the first suit against a university's domestic partnership policy since the amendment took effect. Ohio State University, Cleveland State University, Youngstown State University and several other Ohio universities also offered domestic partner benefits but were not named in the suit.

== Rulings ==
The Butler County Court of Common Pleas dismissed the suit in November 2006, finding that Brinkman lacked standing to bring the suit. Brinkman appealed, and on August 27, 2007, a three-judge panel of the Ohio 12th District Court of Appeals affirmed the dismissal, again finding he lacked standing. Brinkman did not appeal the case to the Ohio Supreme Court.
