= Ohio Senate Bill 104 =

2024 Ohio law

Protect All Students Act

135th Ohio General Assembly
- Long title: To amend sections 3302.03, 3314.03, 3326.11, 3365.03, 3365.04, 3365.05, 3365.11, and 3365.15 and to enact sections 3319.90, 3345.90, and 3365.14 of the Revised Code regarding the College Credit Plus Program and to enact the Protect All Students Act regarding single-sex bathroom access in primary and secondary schools and institutions of higher education.
- Territorial extent: Ohio
- Passed by: Ohio Senate
- Passed: February 28, 2024
- Passed by: Ohio House of Representatives
- Passed: June 26, 2024
- Signed by: Mike DeWine
- Signed: November 27, 2024
- Effective: February 25, 2025

Legislative history

Initiating chamber: Ohio Senate
- Introduced: April 5, 2023
- Third reading: February 28, 2024
- Voting summary: 32 voted for; None voted against

Revising chamber: Ohio House of Representatives
- Received from the Ohio Senate: March 4, 2024
- Third reading: June 26, 2024
- Voting summary: 60 voted for; 31 voted against

Final stages
- Finally passed both chambers: November 13, 2024

Summary
- Modifies the College Credit Plus program and restricts access to school bathrooms and locker rooms to that of sex, with exceptions.
- Status: In force

Ohio Senate Bill 104 (S.B. 104), also known as the Protect All Students Act, is a 2024 law in the state of Ohio that restricts access to bathrooms and locker rooms in schools to that of sex assigned at birth. It was signed into law by Governor Mike DeWine on November 27, 2024 and took effect on February 25, 2025.

The bill previously only encompassed a change to the College Credit Plus program, but the House of Representatives merged House Bill 183, the bathroom bill, into Senate Bill 104.

== Provisions ==
Senate Bill 104 restricts people in Ohio schools, including K-12 schools, colleges, and universities, from using bathrooms and locker rooms that differ from their sex assigned at birth. People assisting children under 10 years old, those with disabilities, or those whose job requires access to all bathrooms are exempt from the law. The bill still allows schools to have unisex bathrooms if they are single occupancy.

To allow enforcement of the law, Senate Bill 104 also defines certain terms, such as biological sex, in state law. It defines biological sex as, "the biological indication of male and female, including sex chromosomes, naturally occurring sex hormones, gonads, and nonambiguous internal and external genitalia present at birth."

Senate Bill 104 also modifies the College Credit Plus program, which allows students grades 7-12 to earn both college and high school credits at the same time.

== Reactions ==
=== Support ===
The Center for Christian Virtue publicly supported Senate Bill 104.

=== Opposition ===
Stonewall Columbus opposed Senate Bill 104, saying that it would promote stigma and discrimination against nonbinary and transgender students. Other civil rights organizations, including the ACLU of Ohio, Equality Ohio, and TransOhio, also released statements in opposition to Senate Bill 104.

== See also ==
- Bathroom bill
- LGBTQ rights in Ohio
