= Law of Ohio =

The law of Ohio consists of several levels, including constitutional, statutory, and regulatory, local and common law. The Ohio Revised Code forms the general statutory law.

== Sources ==
The Constitution of Ohio is the foremost source of state law. Laws may be enacted through the initiative process. Legislation is enacted by the Ohio General Assembly, published in the Laws of Ohio, and codified in the Ohio Revised Code. State agencies promulgate rules and regulations (sometimes called administrative law) in the Register of Ohio, which are in turn codified in the Ohio Administrative Code (OAC). Ohio's legal system is based on common law, which is interpreted by case law through the decisions of the Supreme Court, District Courts of Appeals, and trial courts, which are published in the Ohio Official Reports. Counties, townships, and municipalities may also promulgate local ordinances. In addition, there are also several sources of persuasive authority, which are not binding authority but are useful to lawyers and judges insofar as they help to clarify the current state of the law.

=== Constitution ===
The foremost source of state law is the Constitution of Ohio. The Ohio Constitution in turn is subordinate only to the Constitution of the United States, which is the supreme law of the land. The Ohio Constitution vests the legislative power of the state in the Ohio General Assembly.

=== Legislation ===
Pursuant to the state constitution, the Ohio General Assembly has enacted various laws, called "pamphlet laws" or generically "slip laws". These are published in the official Laws of Ohio and are called "session laws". These in turn have been codified in the Ohio Revised Code. The only official publication of the enactments of the General Assembly is the Laws of Ohio; the Ohio Revised Code is only a reference.

A maximum 900 copies of the Laws of Ohio are published and distributed by the Ohio Secretary of State; there are no commercial publications other than a microfiche republication of the printed volumes. The Ohio Revised Code is not officially printed, but there are several unofficial but certified (by the Ohio Secretary of State) commercial publications: Baldwin's Ohio Revised Code Annotated and Page's Ohio Revised Code Annotated are annotated, while Anderson's Ohio Revised Code Unannotated is not. Baldwin's is available online from Westlaw and Page's is available online from LexisNexis.

=== Regulations ===
Pursuant to certain statutes, state agencies have promulgated rules and regulations (sometimes called administrative law). Notices and proposed rules are published in the Register of Ohio. The Ohio Administrative Code (OAC) contains the codified regulations, and is updated by the Ohio Monthly Report.

The Register of Ohio is not printed, but is published weekly online.

=== Case law ===
Ohio's legal system is based on common law, which is interpreted by case law. The Ohio State Reports, Ohio Appellate Reports, and Ohio Miscellaneous Reports are part of the Ohio Official Reports and contain the opinions of the Supreme Court, appellate courts, and trial courts, respectively.

=== Local laws ===
Ohio is divided into 88 counties. The territory of each county is divided into a total of 1,309 townships as of 2011. In addition, there may be two kinds of incorporated municipalities: cities and villages. Municipalities have full home rule powers, and may adopt a charter for self-government. Counties may adopt charters for home rule. Townships may have limited home rule powers.

Counties and townships may adopt resolutions, and municipalities may adopt ordinances and resolutions, for their government. Municipal resolutions and ordinances of a general nature are required to be published. County resolutions are not required to be published, nor are township resolutions not adopted under self-government. Counties and townships may pass zoning resolutions for the unincorporated areas, and county zoning resolutions prevail over township zoning resolutions unless township residents vote to overrule them. Codified ordinances may or may not be found in a local law library, and zoning resolutions may be purchased from the county recorder.

With respect to the government of Columbus, the codified ordinances are contained in the Columbus City Codes, and all proceedings of the Columbus City Council such as ordinances and resolutions are published in the weekly Columbus City Bulletin.

== See also ==
=== Topics ===
- Capital punishment in Ohio
- Felony murder rule (Ohio)
- Gun laws in Ohio
- LGBT rights in Ohio

=== Other ===
- Politics of Ohio
- Law enforcement in Ohio
- Crime in Ohio
- Law of the United States
