= Ohio House Bill 68 (2023) =

Saving Ohio Adolescents from Experimentation (SAFE) Act

Saving Ohio Adolescents from Experimentation (SAFE) Act

135th Ohio General Assembly
- Long title: To enact sections 3109.054, 3129.01, 3129.02, 3129.03, 3129.04, 3129.05, 3129.06, 3313.5319, and 3345.562 of the Revised Code to enact the Saving Ohio Adolescents from Experimentation (SAFE) Act regarding gender transition services for minors, and to enact the Save Women's Sports Act to require schools, state institutions of higher education, and private colleges to designate separate single-sex teams and sports for each sex.
- Citation: O.H. Legis. Assemb. . Reg. Sess. 2023-2024 (2023).
- Territorial extent: Ohio
- Passed by: Ohio House of Representatives
- Passed: December 13, 2023
- Passed by: Ohio Senate
- Passed: December 13, 2023
- Vetoed: December 29, 2023
- Veto overridden: January 24, 2024
- Effective: April 24, 2024

Legislative history

Initiating chamber: Ohio House of Representatives
- Bill title: House Bill 68
- Introduced by: Gary Click (R–88)
- Passed: December 13, 2023
- Voting summary: 62 voted for; 27 voted against

Revising chamber: Ohio Senate
- Passed: December 13, 2023
- Voting summary: 24 voted for; 8 voted against
- Status: In force

Ohio House Bill 68 (H.B. 68), also known as the Saving Ohio Adolescents from Experimentation (SAFE) Act, is a 2023 law in the state of Ohio that bans certain gender-affirming care for minors, including puberty blockers, hormone replacement therapy (HRT), and gender reassignment surgery, and requires parental consent for other treatment. It also bans transgender girls from competing in girls' sports.

== History ==
H.B. 68 was introduced in February 2023, and passed the Ohio House in June. It passed the Ohio Senate in December after multiple amendments to the bill were agreed to. Governor Mike DeWine vetoed the bill on December 29, though his veto was voided on January 24 following a Senate and House override. A lawsuit was filed by the American Civil Liberties Union on March 26 following the override, which resulted in a stay by the Franklin County Court of Common Pleas on April 16. The status of H.B. 68 is still pending in the courts, but is as of May 2025 in effect until proceedings are over.

== Provisions ==
House Bill 68 restricts access to gender-affirming care for minors without parental consent. It also requires other medical screenings so as to ensure it is gender dysphoria, and not a similar condition. Medical workers who do not abide by the law can face legal repercussions. A grandfather clause is included for Ohioans who were already receiving care that would be restricted prior to April 24, 2024.

== Reactions ==
=== Support ===
Ohio Attorney General Dave Yost supported H.B. 68 and defended it as Attorney General in the courts. The Center for Christian Virtue also backed H.B. 68.

=== Opposition ===
H.B. 68 attracted criticism from organizations such as the American Civil Liberties Union and the Human Rights Campaign. A statement was also released by Democratic U.S. Representative Shontel Brown in opposition.

A joint statement was issued in opposition to H.B. 68 on December 5, 2023, by many local and national medical associations, including the Ohio State Medical Association, the American Academy of Pediatrics, the American College of Obstetricians and Gynecologists, and other local medical organizations. Local organizations such as Equality Ohio and the Ohio chapter of the National Association of Social Workers also opposed H.B. 68. Ohio Democrats opposed the bill in both chambers of the legislature.

==== Mike DeWine ====
Governor Mike DeWine, a Republican, vetoed the bill after consideration for multiple days on December 29, 2023. In his veto message, he explained that most transgender healthcare saved the lives of many Ohio minors and that it was not the state's role to make that decision. DeWine did publicly support the provision banning sex reassignment surgery for minors, however.

== See also ==
- LGBTQ rights in Ohio
