= Peter Stautberg =

American politician

Member of the Ohio House of Representatives from the 34th district
- In office January 5, 2009-December 31, 2014
- Preceded by: Tom Brinkman
- Succeeded by: Tom Brinkman

Personal details
- Born: October 15, 1964 (age 61) Cincinnati, Ohio
- Party: Republican
- Education: Kenyon College (BA); Ohio State University (MA, JD)
- Profession: Attorney

Peter Stautberg (born October 15, 1964) is a state appellate judge and former Republican member of the Ohio House of Representatives, representing the 27th District. He served the 34th House District from 2008-2012 prior to redistricting. He served as chairman of the House Public Utilities Committee.

== Career ==
After receiving both Master's and Law Degrees from Ohio State University, Stautberg became an attorney with Fifth Third Bank.

== Ohio House of Representatives ==
With incumbent Representative Tom Brinkman unable to run due to term limits, Stautberg and two others sought to replace him. In the primary, Stautberg was narrowly victorious, winning 35% of the electorate. He faced Democrat Jeff Sinnard in the general election, and won by about 11,000 votes. He won reelection in 2010.

For the 129th General Assembly, Speaker of the House William G. Batchelder named Stautberg as a member of the Republican majority caucus' Policy Committee. He also served on the Ways and Means Committee; and on the committees of Public Utilities (as Chairman); and Financial Institutions, Housing, and Urban Development. He also serves on the Hamilton County Transportation Improvement District Board of Trustees; and the Ohio Arts Council.

Stautberg won a third term in 2012 over Democrat Nathan Wissman with 67.07% of the vote. In 2014, Stautberg lost the Republican re-nomination to his predecessor, Tom Brinkman.

== State Appellate Judge ==
In 2015, Stautberg was named by Gov. John Kasich to fill a vacancy on the Ohio 1st District Court of Appeals.
