= Ohio House Bill 8 (2023) =

Ohio Parents' Bill of Rights law (2023)

Enact the Parents' Bill of Rights

135th Ohio General Assembly
- Long title: To amend sections 3313.6022, 3314.03, and 3326.11 and to enact sections 3313.473 and 3313.6030 of the Revised Code to enact the Parents' Bill of Rights to require public schools to adopt a policy on parental notification on student health and well-being and instructional materials with sexuality content and regarding school district policies for released time courses in religious instruction.
- Citation: O.H. Legis. Assemb. . Reg. Sess. 2023-2024.
- Territorial extent: Ohio
- Passed by: Ohio House of Representatives
- Passed: December 18, 2024
- Assented to: January 8, 2025
- Signed by: Mike DeWine
- Effective: April 9, 2025

Legislative history
- Introduced by: D. J. Swearingen(R–89) and Sara Carruthers(R–47)
- Preliminary reading: June 14, 2023
- Second reading: June 21, 2023
- Status: In force

Ohio House Bill 8 (H.B. 8), also known as the Parent's Bill of Rights, is a 2023 law in the state of Ohio that allows parents to opt kids out of topics related to gender and sexuality and requires schools to notify parents about students' gender identity. It also requires schools to allow students to attend religious services even if it conflicts with their school schedule. It was signed into law on January 8, 2025 by Governor Mike DeWine after passing in both chambers of the Ohio General Assembly in December.

The bill originally focused on "sexually explicit content", but was amended in June 2023 to focus on topics related to sexuality and gender. It drew comparisons to Florida's "Don't Say Gay" bill, also known as the Parental Rights in Education Act or H.B. 1557. Crisis calls tripled relative to December 2024 after it was signed into law.

== Provisions ==
H.B. 8 requires K-12 schools to notify parents if their child identifies differently from their biological sex, generally affecting transgender and non-binary individuals. It mandates that schools allow parents to opt their children out of content related to sexuality if they do not approve of it. They are required to notify parents if they notice a change in student behavior and health. Schools are also required to publicly state all healthcare services that are available at said schools.

Schools are also required to allow students to leave class for religious instruction, which prior to H.B. 8 was optional and was determined by school district.

School policies regarding H.B. 8 are required to be in effect by July 1, 2025, beginning with the 2025-2026 school year.

== Reactions ==
=== Support ===
H.B. 8 was endorsed by the Center for Christian Virtue. Alliance Defending Freedom, a Christian advocacy group, released a statement in support of H.B. 8 after it was signed into law. Governor Mike DeWine, who signed H.B. 8 into law, stated that he believed the bill was for the greater good in that it informed parents and that it did not harm LGBTQ+ students.

=== Opposition ===
H.B. 8 attracted opposition from LGBTQ+ and legal organizations across the state, including Equality Ohio and ACLU Ohio.

The Ohio School Counselor Association and the Ohio Education Association both released statements in opposition to H.B. 8.
