= Gun laws in Ohio =

Location of Ohio in the United States

Gun laws in Ohio regulate the sale, possession, and use of firearms and ammunition in the U.S. state of Ohio.

== Summary table ==
Subject / law	Long guns	Handguns	Relevant statutes	Notes
State permit required to purchase?	No	No		
Firearm registration?	No	No		
Assault weapon law?	No	No	O.R.C. 2923.11	
Magazine capacity restriction?	No	No		
Owner license required?	No	No		
Permit required for concealed carry?	N/A	No	O.R.C. 2923.111; O.R.C. 2923.12; O.R.C. 2923.125	Ohio is a "shall issue" state for citizens and lawful permanent residents who are 21 years or older. Permitless carry took effect on June 13, 2022.
Permit required for open carry?	No	No	O.R.C. 2923.111; O.R.C. 2923.16	May carry openly without permit.
Castle Doctrine/Stand Your Ground law?	Yes	Yes	O.R.C. 2901.09	
State preemption of local restrictions?	Yes	Yes	O.R.C. 9.68	
NFA weapons restricted?	No	No	O.R.C. 2923.17	
Shall certify?	Yes	Yes	O.R.C. 311.43	Shall certify within 45 days.
Peaceable Journey laws?	No	No		
Background checks required for private sales?	No	No		
Duty to inform?	No	If asked by a law enforcement officer	O.R.C. 2923.12; O.R.C. 2923.16	If asked by Law Enforcement. Section 2923.12 (B)(1)
Purchase age restriction?	Yes, 18+	Yes, 21+	O.R.C. 2923.211(B)	In addition to federal law, state law prohibits sales of handguns to those under 21, including in private transactions.

== State constitutional provisions ==
Article I, Section 4 of the Ohio Constitution states: "The people have the right to bear arms for their defense and security; but standing armies, in time of peace, are dangerous to liberty, and shall not be kept up; and the military shall be in strict subordination to the civil power."

== Restrictions on purchasing ==
To purchase a long gun (rifle or shotgun) in Ohio, a person must be at least 18 years of age, with some restrictions still remaining. To be able to qualify to purchase a handgun (pistol or revolver) in Ohio, a person must be at least 21 years of age. This applies to both private sales and those through a Federal Firearms Licensee. However, the law regarding purchasing age is silent on ammunition, components and accessories. In Ohio, there are also a few other laws that are important to be mindful of. It is illegal to consciously fire a firearm while inside of a motor vehicle. Antique or replica rifles, shotguns, and handguns are supposed to be treated with the same urgency and under the same law a modern firearm would be. Antiques or replicas have to be carried and purchased under modern Ohio regulatory law.

While there are restrictions against purchasing a long gun under 18 years of age and purchasing a handgun under 21 years of age, there are no restrictions against possessing a long gun under the age of 18 or possessing a handgun under the age of 21. Ohio law is silent on 80% receivers and other firearms parts, as well as manufacturing one's own firearm. One may openly carry a long gun or handgun under the respective purchasing ages, per se.

== Concealed carry ==
In April 2004, Ohio became the 45th state to legalize concealed carry and its statute went into effect. The law (Ohio Revised Code [O.R.C.] 2923.12, et seq.) allows persons 21 and older to receive a concealed handgun license provided that they receive a minimum of 8 hours of handgun training (6 hours of classroom instruction and 2 hours of range time) from a certified instructor, demonstrate competency with a handgun through written and shooting tests, pass a criminal background check, and meet certain residency requirements [non-residents who work in Ohio will be allowed to obtain licenses as of March 23, 2015].

The statute prohibits any person with any drug conviction from receiving a license, as well as any person convicted of a felony and those who have been convicted of certain misdemeanor crimes of violence within three years (ORC 2923.125).

Ohio's concealed handgun law allows for reciprocity with other states with "substantially comparable" statutes, and to date Ohio has reciprocity with 22 other states. Such written agreements allow licensees from each state to carry in the other. Other states, such as Iowa, recognize Ohio licenses in their state without reciprocity, meaning Ohio does not in turn recognize permits issued by that state. Indiana and Ohio now have reciprocity. All told an Ohio license is accepted in 30 other states, although some of these states such as Vermont do not require anybody to have a license to carry. As of March 23, 2015, non-residents will be able to carry on any valid out-of-state license regardless of whether or not a formal reciprocity agreement has been signed.

An Ohio concealed carry license does not allow totally unfettered carry. Any owner of private property can ban handguns by posting a sign in clear view or providing verbal notice. Additional "no-carry" zones are mandated by O.R.C., including most government buildings, churches, and school property with the latter two zones having exceptions for licensees in certain circumstances. Various other "no-carry" zones are also enumerated.

Employers may not forbid employees from storing guns in their vehicles while the vehicle is on the employer's parking lot.

The law also allows concealed carry permit holders to:

- Store their guns in the car while in a school zone
- Carry in non-secure areas of airports, such as baggage claim.
- Carry inside daycare centers and home daycares, unless the facilities post a sign prohibiting guns

On March 14, 2022, Ohio Governor Mike DeWine signed Senate Bill 215 (effective June 13, 2022). Under its provisions, any person 21+, residents and nonresidents, who meets the definition of a "qualifying adult" under O.R.C. 2923.111, may carry a concealed handgun without a license. Residents and non-residents under 21 may still open carry, but require a valid concealed handgun license issued by another U.S. jurisdiction to conceal carry.

== Open carry ==
Ohio is a traditional open-carry state. The open-carry of firearms by those who legally possess the firearm is a legal activity in Ohio with or without a license. It is legal for a person to open-carry a loaded handgun in a vehicle without a permit, as long as they are eligible to receive a concealed handgun license.

One may not open-carry a firearm upon or into: a school, the grounds of a school, school building, school premises, school activity, or school bus; a courthouse or other building in which a courtroom is located; or an establishment licensed to serve alcohol, unless the person is eligible for a concealed handgun license and is not consuming alcohol.

It is lawful for one to open-carry firearms in certain locations that are statutorily prohibited for those who are conceal-carrying, such as police stations and sheriff's offices or other such law enforcement buildings; churches, mosques, synagogues, and other places of worship; etc.

== Firearms in motor vehicles ==
It is illegal for someone with alcohol in their system to possess a firearm in their vehicle or on their person.

Handguns may be loaded while transported, either visibly or concealed, whether on a person or otherwise stored in the motor vehicle, without a permit, as long as the person is eligible to receive a concealed handgun license. Rifles and shotguns must be kept unloaded, and kept in plain sight in a rack, inside a closed container, or inside a compartment that can only be reached by exiting the vehicle, with limited exceptions. Persons who are not eligible to receive a concealed handgun license must follow the same rules for transporting handguns as with rifles and shotguns.

Ammunition and magazines must be in a separate compartment or container from a firearm unless possessed by a person who is eligible for a concealed handgun license, in which case handguns may be loaded and rifles or shotguns can be transported in the same compartment or container as ammunition.

One may not transport a loaded handgun onto school property unless the person has been issued a concealed handgun license, the firearm remains concealed in the vehicle, and, if the person leaves the vehicle, locks said vehicle.

== State preemption ==
Per O.R.C. 9.68, all firearm laws in Ohio, except those restricting the discharge of firearms and certain zoning regulations, supersede any local ordinances. This restriction on municipalities was upheld by the Ohio Supreme Court in the cases of OFCC vs. Clyde (2008) and City of Cleveland vs. State of Ohio (2010). An individual in Ohio has a constitutional right, by the United States Constitution and the Ohio State Constitution to bear arms. This is a right that is consistently upheld and respected by the state of Ohio and it is the responsibility of the general assembly to create a set of fair, just and uniform laws throughout Ohio when monitoring the possession, retail or ownership of a firearm or the necessary components to use a firearm. That is the expectation of the state's government leaders and their regulation practices.

Some counties have adopted Second Amendment sanctuary resolutions.

== See also ==
- Law of Ohio
