= Ohio House Bill 100 (135th GA) =

2023 legislation protecting display of flags

Ohio House Bill 100 (HB 100), also known as the Chief Steven DiSario Act, is a bill passed by the Ohio General Assembly in 2023 that prohibits manufactured home park operators, condominium associations, neighborhood associations, and landlords from restricting the display of the "thin blue line" flag. The bill was introduced during the 135th General Assembly and signed into law following bipartisan support.

== Legislative history ==
HB 100 was introduced in the Ohio House of Representatives in early 2023. It passed the House on June 14, 2023, by a vote of 65–28 and later passed the Ohio Senate unanimously on June 7, 2023, with a vote of 31–0.

== Provisions ==
The legislation prevents various forms of property governance from restricting the display of flags that support law enforcement, specifically protecting the right to fly the "thin blue line" flag. The bill was named in honor of Chief Steven DiSario, a law enforcement officer killed in the line of duty.

== Controversy ==
Supporters of HB 100 argue that it upholds First Amendment rights and honors fallen police officers. However, critics have raised concerns about the "thin blue line" flag, which has been associated with white supremacist groups and prominently displayed during the January 6 United States Capitol attack. Opponents argue that the law may embolden public displays of divisive or racially charged symbolism under the guise of honoring law enforcement.
