= Tom Brinkman =

American politician

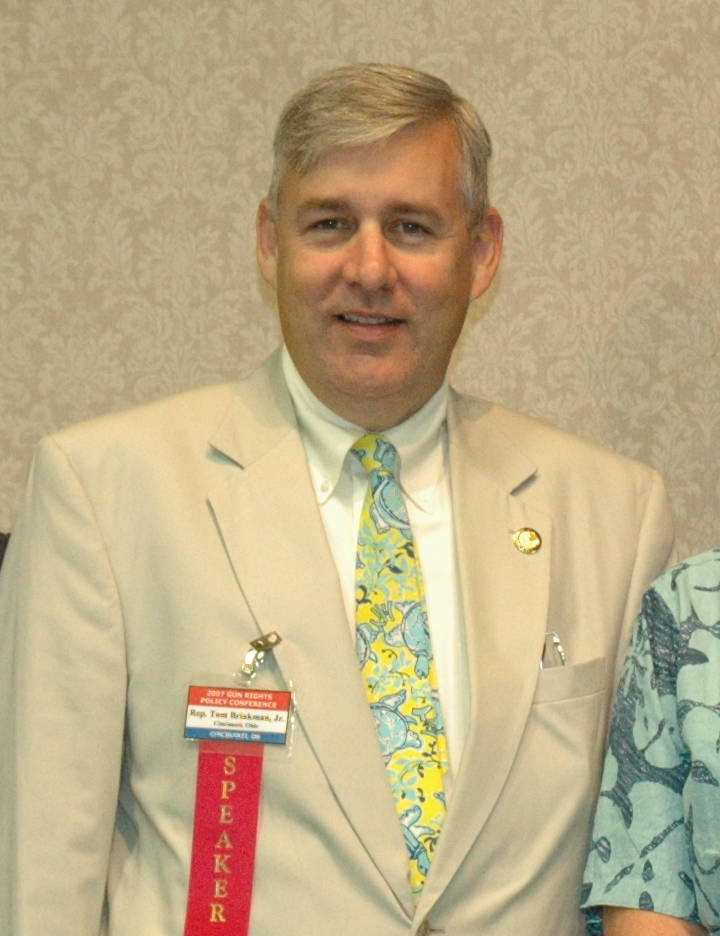

Member of the Ohio House of Representatives from the 27th district
- In office January 6, 2015 – December 31, 2022
- Preceded by: Peter Stautberg
- Succeeded by: Rachel Baker
- In office January 3, 2001 – December 31, 2008
- Preceded by: Jacquelyn K. O'Brien
- Succeeded by: Peter Stautberg

Personal details
- Born: December 6, 1957 (age 68) Cincinnati, Ohio, U.S.
- Party: Republican
- Education: St. Xavier High School
- Alma mater: George Washington University

Thomas E. Brinkman Jr. (born December 6, 1957) is a Republican politician from the state of Ohio. He represented Cincinnati in the Ohio House of Representatives from 2001 to 2008 and again from 2015 to 2022.

He is known for his opposition to higher taxes and public spending. In 2014, Brinkman defeated incumbent Peter Stautberg in the Republican primary election to retake his former seat in the Ohio House of Representatives. He went on to win the general election with 67.78% of the vote.

== Association with Team Householder ==
During the 2018 Ohio House election cycle, Tom Brinkman was identified in reporting as one of the Republican candidates recruited by then-State Representative Larry Householder as part of an organized effort to regain the speakership of the Ohio House of Representatives. According to an investigation by Cleveland.com, Householder assembled a slate of candidates, commonly referred to as “Team Householder,” who were encouraged to run for office with the expectation that they would support his bid for Speaker if elected. Schmidt was listed among the candidates recruited as part of this strategy.

The successful election of multiple Team Householder candidates enabled Householder to secure enough internal support to be elected Speaker at the start of the 133rd Ohio General Assembly.

=== Vote on the Expulsion of Larry Householder ===
During the 134th Ohio General Assembly, Tom Brinkman voted against the expulsion of former House Speaker Larry Householder, who had been federally indicted and later convicted in connection with the Ohio nuclear bribery scandal tied to House Bill 6. The Ohio House voted 75–21 to expel Householder, with Brinkman among the 21 Republican members who opposed the resolution.

== Background ==
A resident of the Mount Lookout section of Cincinnati, Brinkman graduated from St. Xavier High School and received a B.A. (in history and political science) from George Washington University in 1979. In 1976, he worked for the Ronald Reagan campaign to win the Republican nomination for President, and for the Gerald Ford campaign following Ford's nomination at the Republican National Convention in Kansas City. While a student at GWU, he worked in the office of Senator Bob Dole of Kansas from 1977 to 1979. In 1980 he supported Congressman John B. Anderson's presidential bid, but switched his support to Reagan following the Republican National Convention. From his graduation to 1999, he was Midwest Sales Manager for the Metroweb printing company in Erlanger, Kentucky. From 2001, he has worked in the sales department of the Curry Printing Company of Evendale, Ohio.

He and his wife, Cathy, have six children: Will, Stephen, Daniel, Kelley, Kevin, and Michael.

== Local politics ==
Brinkman worked for several Republicans' successful campaigns for Cincinnati City Council: Phil Heimlich, Steve Chabot, Charles Winburn, and Pat DeWine. He also worked for John Kruse's unsuccessful bid.

In 1999, he founded the Coalition Opposed to Additional Spending and Taxes (COAST), which actively opposes tax levies in southwestern Ohio. Brinkman actively worked against many tax levies and bond issues. In his Congressional campaign he declared:

== General Assembly ==
Brinkman defeated the candidate endorsed by the Republican party in the GOP primary in 2000 for the 37th District seat in the Ohio House, which was Anderson Township, the Hyde Park and Mount Lookout sections of Cincinnati, and the city of Norwood . A Brinkman supporter was upset by the party's endorsement process: "All we wanted was a free, open process of endorsement, and we didn't get that," said Christopher Finney . In the primary, Steve Adams, the endorsed candidate, received 9,344 votes and Brinkman 11,127. In the November general election, he faced Democrat Les Mann, a security guard at General Electric's aircraft engine plant in Evendale who previously had run for Congress against Rob Portman, and Natural Law candidate Jim Donaldson. The vote was 35,245 for Brinkman (66.7%), 2,029 for Donaldson (3.8%), and 15,531 for Mann (29.4%).

Brinkman ran for reelection in 2002 to what redistricting had made the 34th District, which included the Mount Washington, Hyde Park, and Mount Lookout sections of Cincinnati, part of Columbia Township, all of Anderson Township, and the municipalities of Fairfax, Newtown and Terrace Park . He faced no opposition in the May 7 primary and was opposed in the November 5 general election by Democrat David Schaff, a twenty-four-year-old assistant to Hamilton County commissioner Todd Portune. Schaff said his opponent was "someone who's spent more time saying what he's against than working for what he's for." Schaff was endorsed by The Cincinnati Post, which wrote

Tom Brinkman's opposition to almost everything undercuts his credibility, and does a disservice to both the district and the region. His reflexive opposition to much government spending, his willingness to tolerate a tattered social services safety net, his advocacy of an entirely unregulated concealed carry gun permit system, we submit, are out of step even with such a thoroughly Republican constituency.

That year Brinkman called on Republican voters to cast their ballots for Democrat Tim Hagan over Republican Governor Bob Taft in his reelection bid because of Taft's selection of Jennette Bradley as his running mate; many conservatives felt she was too liberal for the party. The Cincinnati Enquirer's Peter Bronson labeled Brinkman "Kamikaze Tom" for this action, but nevertheless, Brinkman was easily reelected over Schaff by a vote of 23,748 to 13,896.

== His stands in Columbus ==
When University of Cincinnati law students in 2003 persuaded the General Assembly to ratify the Fourteenth Amendment, which a post-Civil War-era legislature had rejected, only one member voted against ratification: Brinkman. Brinkman told The Enquirer his vote was because of how the amendment has been misused:

It's misapplied constantly by the country to get states to do things they don't want to do. Most importantly to me, 45 million babies have been murdered since judges forced Roe v. Wade down the throats of citizens.

Following the repeal of Article XII of the Cincinnati city charter, which forbade the city from passing an ordinance protecting homosexuals from discrimination, the Cincinnati city council approved a hate crime ordinance that included sexual orientation. Brinkman said the ordinance "send[s] the message that you openly approve of homosexuality," citing the Catechism of the Catholic Church . Brinkman had previously served as treasurer of the committee which opposed repeal of Article XII .

Brinkman prided himself on his perfect attendance and for coming home to Cincinnati every night from Columbus, but when Columbus Monthly in late 2003 did a survey of legislators, lobbyists, and others working in the State House asking them to rate the members of the Ohio General Assembly, Brinkman was rated the single worst legislator in the 132-member General Assembly. The magazine said Brinkman was "an uncompromisingly principled man. But he's a terrible, terrible legislator." Those surveyed ranked him as least knowledgeable, least hardworking, least likeable, least compassionate, and least savvy. Brinkman, for his part, points to his principled stance on the issues as the reason lobbyists don't like him.

In 2007, Representative Brinkman was named the chairman of the House Commerce and Labor Committee. He is one of the cosponsors on the ‘both sides of the Holocaust’ bill, HB327.

== 2004 reelection ==
In 2004, he faced a challenger in the primary, attorney Greg Delev of Anderson Township. Brinkman told the Enquirer, "I ran for office when the party wanted to dictate who my state representative was going to be. I couldn't stand for that, so I ran, and I'm proud I did. It's been a frustrating three years as I've watched Governor Taft drive the state off a cliff. But I've been fighting back." Delev said he agreed with Brinkman on most of the issues, but that Brinkman's actions in Columbus had made the district "the laughingstock of the state." The Cincinnati Enquirer said both candidates were "rock-ribbed conservatives who agree on most fiscal and social issues," but endorsed Delev. "The issue here is Brinkman's lack of effectiveness," said the newspaper, echoing the Columbus Monthly article:

Few lawmakers are as honest, principled and consistent as Brinkman. But he exhibits those qualities to a fault, coming off as stubborn, ideologically rigid and unwilling to compromise. He's made many enemies in Columbus by refusing to see anyone else's side of things. This has limited his ability to work with others and get things done.

Brinkman won the March 2 primary: 7,113 (63.00%) to 4,178 (37.00%).

In the general election on November 2 he faced Democrat Glenn Miller of Anderson Township, a former history teacher who worked in job training. "I think the biggest issue of this race is Tom Brinkman—how he votes and how he's against everything," Miller said. The Enquirer, again citing his stubbornness, endorsed Miller . Despite the criticism, Brinkman once again won the Republican district by a comfortable margin: 35,229 (60.04%) for Brinkman to 23,451 (39.96%) for Miller.

Brinkman strongly supported concealed carry legislation. "We have a constitutional right to bear arms. Larry Flynt has a right to put out smut and some people may not like that, but it's a right whether we like it or not," he said . Brinkman sponsored legislation to allow ex-cons the right to cut hair. He called "stupid" the policy of the state regulators to deny prisoners who had taken prison-administered barber classes a license upon their release. "I'm for personal responsibility, but people do make mistakes and we should give them a second chance," Brinkman said .

Brinkman also worked to limit state spending just as he had opposed local projects. In 2003, he opposed Taft's "Third Frontier" project and the bond issue on the November ballot as Issue One which would have permitted the state to borrow money to subsidize business's research and development. "Who would have thought a Republican governor would run on this?" Brinkman said (Issue One was soundly defeated by voters). When Taft proposed in 2004 the question once more be submitted to the voters, Brinkman renewed his criticism. "Corporate welfare is corporate welfare. Just because you buy off the manufacturers with more money for them, and you buy off the farmers, doesn't change what it is." He said he would join Democrats in voting against its placement on the November 2005 ballot.

Brinkman in 2004 criticized state spending for Cincinnati's bid to win the 2012 Olympic Games and against legislation in 2004 to give hospitals more money for breast cancer examinations . Later that year, he spearheaded a campaign to repeal the City of Cincinnati property tax. While it did make it to the November ballot, it was rejected by the voters . He was also a supporter of Ohio Secretary of State Ken Blackwell's proposed amendment to the Ohio Constitution to limit state spending . In 2005, he was one of only eight Republicans in the Ohio House to vote against the state budget, which raised taxes and increased spending. Previously, he had opposed Governor Taft's proposed personal income tax cut because it would mean higher local property taxes. He also called for funding for public libraries to be maintained.

On April 28, 2005, he introduced a bill, House Bill 228, that would ban all abortions. Brinkman acknowledged that the bill was unconstitutional under Roe v. Wade, but wanted to use it as a test case to overturn the Roe decision. "We’re just positioning the state for the future," he told the Cleveland Plain Dealer.

== Congressional bid ==
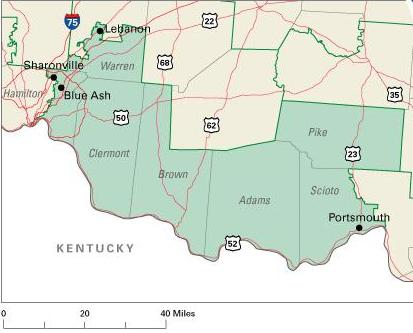
The Second District, which includes seven counties in southern Ohio.

Brinkman ran for Congress in 2005 to replace Portman, announcing his candidacy outside the post office in Anderson Township on April 14 . Brinkman told the press "When I first went to Columbus, I promised my constituents that I would fight for lower taxes, limited government, and to end abortion. I will do the same in Washington." An early poll found Pat DeWine, a member of the Hamilton County Commission and the son of U.S. Sen. Mike DeWine, with a significant lead: 42 percent for DeWine, 6 percent for Brinkman.

Brinkman had a strong anti-abortion stance that was criticized by rival candidate Pat DeWine because he also opposed the death penalty - despite such opposition being seemingly more anti-abortion, as it is in accordance with the Consistent Life Ethic. One mailing from DeWine had a large, ominous photograph of a man in a ski mask pointing a gun directly at the viewer. The caption was "Tom Brinkman opposes the death penalty, even for child murderers, cop killers and terrorists who kill Americans." The mailing also stated "Tom Brinkman says he's a conservative but when it comes to the safety of our families, he doesn't stand with us" and that murderers "will get off easy if he casts the deciding vote." DeWine did not note that Brinkman's opposition to the death penalty was rooted in his pro-life beliefs. Automated calls were made by DeWine's campaign featuring Joe Deters, Hamilton County prosecutor. Deters in the recording stated:

In my career when I prosecute the worst of the worst like people who kill children, I believe the only appropriate punishment is the death penalty. Tom Brinkman is against the death penalty even for those vicious killers who prey on our kids, and he's even against the death penalty for terrorists who kill Americans. Our next congressman must go to Washington and fight to remove these murderers from society. Tom Brinkman will work to stop the death penalty just as he's done in Columbus. Pat DeWine believes these people should go. And that's one more reason I support Pat DeWine for Congress.

One of Brinkman's mailings said "Tom Brinkman believes all life is precious and must be protected. He has a 100% pro-life voting record." Brinkman's position was that he was "100% pro-life from conception to natural death." While DeWine also stated his anti-aboetion position, Brinkman noted on his web site "Because of [my] unwavering support of the Right to Life, from conception to natural death, Ohio Right to Life, Cincinnati Right to Life and Family First have again exclusively endorsed my election this year." In an Associated Press article, Brinkman was quoted as putting it more simply, saying he was "pro-life all the way" .

Brinkman also complained about DeWine taking advantage of his father's name in raising money, but publicly distancing himself from his father's positions, such as Senator DeWine's role in the "Gang of 14" judicial filibuster compromise in May 2005 with six other mostly center-leaning Republicans and seven mostly center-leaning Democrats. "He seems to have no problems riding his father's coattails when it comes to raising money and getting name recognition; he's willing to take all the good from it and none of the bad."

In one mailing to voters Brinkman did not mince words:

I am sick and tired of watching politicians promise to cut taxes in October—then raise them in March.

I have had it with candidates who campaign against big government and later give in to the money hungry bureaucrats.

I will not tolerate ideologically bent liberals trying to shift our educational focus from English and math to 'safe sex' and homosexual acceptance. [His emphasis]

In another mailing, he declared "He meant what he promised. He promised what he meant. Brinkman is faithful 100% ... 100% Against Higher Taxes ... 100% Committed to Limited Government ... 100% Pro-life ... 100% Pro-Second Amendment ... 100% Attendance Record," the latter referring to his never missing a roll call vote in the Ohio House.

Brinkman was endorsed by the Ohio Taxpayers Association, the Gun Owners of America Political Victory Fund, and was the National Right to Work Committee's 2005 state legislator of the year. The Anderson Township Republican Club ranked him "highly qualified". The Cincinnati Enquirer endorsed Jean Schmidt, praising her record in the Ohio House, writing of her substantial record. Schmidt, said the Enquirer, the measures "successfully sponsored were remarkable in number and quality for a neophyte lawmaker". The paper contrasted her to Brinkman, who

has kept close touch with people and has been conscientious in constituent service. We admire the consistency of the principles he operates under. But he has earned a reputation as one of Ohio's least effective legislators, too often an uncompromising, anti-any-tax "no" vote. It's hard to see how he could effectively serve this district .

Brinkman ran well in the June 14 primary but finished third behind former state representative Schmidt with 9,211 (20.3%) of the vote.

Brinkman had considered a challenge to Schmidt in the May 2006 primary but chose instead to run for re-election to the Ohio House.

In 2008, Brinkman declared his candidacy for Ohio's 2nd Congressional District, challenging incumbent Schmidt. He lost in a landslide defeat to Congresswoman Schmidt.

== Return to the Ohio House of Representatives ==
In 2014, Brinkman decided to run again for his former seat in the Ohio House of Representatives. However, incumbent Peter Stautberg did not want to give up his seat, so Brinkman opted to challenge him in the primary. He would defeat Stautberg to take the seat. He won the general election easily to take the seat.

== See also ==
- Ohio's 2nd congressional district
- 2005 Ohio's 2nd congressional district special election
- Brinkman v. Miami University
