= Equality Ohio =

LGBTQ nonprofit

- Founded: 1 March 2005; 21 years ago
- Legal status: 501(c)(3) nonprofit organization
- Purpose: LGBTQ+ rights
- Headquarters: Columbus, Ohio, U.S.
- Executive Director: Dwayne Steward
- Deputy Director: vacant
- Revenue: US$1,801,949 (2024)
- Expenses: US$2,388,972 (2024)
- Employees: 10 (2026)
- Website: equalityohio.org

Equality Ohio is a nonpartisan, nonprofit organization that supports lesbian, gay, bisexual and transgender (LGBTQ) equality in Ohio. The organization is a member of the Equality Federation.

Since its founding, Equality Ohio has concurrently operated under two separate nonprofit tax identification numbers – one for Equality Ohio and another for the Equality Ohio Education Fund. The latter of these retains most of the funding for the organization.

== History ==
Equality Ohio was founded in 2005 following the passage of Ohio Issue 1, which banned state recognition of same-sex relationships.

=== Leadership transitions ===
In its twenty-year history, Equality Ohio has had several executive directors, though it has never been led by a transgender person. The organization's first executive director, Lynne Bowman, was one of its founders, and she served as its executive director for over 5 years. Following this, Sue Doerfer became executive director in December 2009, but she announced her resignation in late 2010. Doerfer was replaced by Ed Mullen, who was a former candidate for Illinois State Representative and civil rights lawyer from Chicago, and Mullen served in this role for nearly two years. In 2012, the organization hired its fourth executive director, Elyzabeth Joy Holford, and Holford left the role to return to California in 2015. Following this, Alana Jochum was named the executive director in 2015. The longest serving leader at the organization, Jochum left in late 2023; the following year, the organization hired its first black executive director, Dwayne Steward.

=== Legislative priorities ===
In the early 2010s, Equality Ohio focused on advancing state legislation to prohibit employment discrimination or housing discrimination based on sexual orientation. During this period, the organization was also focused on the Equal Housing and Employment Act (HB 335/SB 231) and enumeration of the safe schools legislation, which was passed in January 2012. Following this, Equality Ohio focused on marriage equality.

Given opposition in the state legislature, Equality Ohio endorsed the Citizens Not Politicians campaign for the 2024 Issue 1 ballot initiative against gerrymandering.

=== Labor union ===
In fall 2022, the organization announced that its employees had elected to form a labor union. The leadership of the organization agreed to voluntarily recognize the labor union, Equality Ohio Workers United. In late 2025, the organization laid off most of its staff, including several union members.

== See also ==
- LGBT rights in Ohio
- Same-sex marriage in Ohio
- List of LGBT rights organizations
