= 2004 Ohio Issue 1 =

Referendum banning same-sex marriage

State Issue 1
- November 2, 2004
- Ohio Definition of Marriage Amendment

Results
Choice	Votes	%
Yes	3,329,335	61.71%
No	2,065,462	38.29%
Valid votes	5,394,797	94.27%
Invalid or blank votes	327,646	5.73%
Total votes	5,722,443	100.00%
Registered voters/turnout	7,972,826	67.66%
County results
Yes
70–80%
60–70%
50–60%
No
50–60%

Section 15.11 is a provision in the Ohio Constitution that makes it unconstitutional for the state to recognize or perform same-sex marriages or civil unions. Approved as a constitutional amendment in 2004 under the name of "Issue One", it received support from 61.7% of voters.

The text of the amendment states:

Only a union between one man and one woman may be a marriage valid in or recognized by this state and its political subdivisions. This state and its political subdivisions shall not create or recognize a legal status for relationships of unmarried individuals that intends to approximate the design, qualities, significance or effect of marriage.

The LGBT rights organization Equality Ohio was founded in response to the passage of Issue 1.

Many political experts credit the amendment with bolstering turnout in rural Ohio, leading to many religious supporters of President George W. Bush to turnout to the polls, helping him win the state of Ohio by a narrow 2 point margin.

== Results ==
Issue 1
Choice	Votes	%
For	3,329,335	61.71
Against	2,065,462	38.29
Total	5,394,797	100.00
Registered voters/turnout	8,427,696	64.01

=== County breakdown ===
Breakdown of voting by county
County	Yes	Votes	No	Votes
Adams	75.34%	8,700	24.66%	2,847
Allen	71.04%	33,765	28.96%	13,764
Ashland	70.48%	17,447	29.52%	7,307
Ashtabula	61.10%	27,133	38.90%	17,275
Athens	44.22%	12,816	55.78%	16,166
Auglaize	75.18%	17,051	24.82%	5,628
Belmont	72.32%	23,521	27.68%	9,002
Brown	74.12%	14,394	25.88%	5,026
Butler	68.08%	109,779	31.92%	51,462
Carroll	70.75%	9,822	29.25%	4,060
Champaign	70.17%	12,915	29.83%	5,491
Clark	63.88%	42,661	36.12%	24,126
Clermont	68.21%	58,172	31.79%	27,108
Clinton	71.65%	12,791	28.35%	5,062
Columbiana	70.14%	33,970	29.86%	14,465
Coshocton	69.78%	11,693	30.22%	5,063
Crawford	70.92%	15,197	29.08%	6,232
Cuyahoga	53.26%	335,678	46.74%	294,569
Darke	72.93%	18,803	27.07%	6,980
Defiance	72.40%	13,048	27.60%	4,975
Delaware	62.19%	48,844	37.81%	29,696
Erie	63.59%	24,466	36.41%	14,007
Fairfield	68.02%	45,423	31.98%	21,352
Fayette	74.83%	8,544	25.17%	2,874
Franklin	51.99%	248,873	48.01%	229,841
Fulton	71.77%	15,041	28.23%	5,917
Gallia	79.76%	10,897	20.24%	2,766
Geauga	59.93%	29,360	40.07%	19,630
Greene	62.04%	48,100	37.96%	29,430
Guernsey	69.23%	11,781	30.77%	5,237
Hamilton	56.30%	229,118	43.70%	177,850
Hancock	72.46%	24,787	27.54%	9,422
Hardin	74.49%	9,710	25.51%	3,325
Harrison	69.67%	5,566	30.33%	2,423
Henry	73.63%	10,834	26.37%	3,881
Highland	76.61%	13,819	23.39%	4,219
Hocking	69.99%	8,935	30.01%	3,832
Holmes	76.54%	8,525	23.46%	2,613
Huron	68.69%	17,180	31.31%	7,831
Jackson	74.98%	10,332	25.02%	3,448
Jefferson	72.41%	25,726	27.59%	9,801
Knox	68.19%	17,815	31.81%	8,310
Lake	57.63%	65,012	42.37%	47,796
Lawrence	79.44%	21,155	20.56%	5,474
Licking	66.28%	51,612	33.72%	26,262
Logan	72%	15,112	28%	5,878
Lorain	58.90%	80,124	41.10%	55,900
Lucas	57.61%	119,916	42.39%	88,227
Madison	70%	12,003	30%	5,144
Mahoning	62.95%	81,469	37.05%	47,951
Marion	67.91%	19,374	32.09%	9,157
Medina	61.56%	50,655	38.44%	31,629
Meigs	75.15%	7,861	24.85%	2,600
Mercer	77.05%	15,777	22.95%	4,698
Miami	67.77%	33,641	32.23%	15,998
Monroe	74.29%	5,651	25.71%	1,956
Montgomery	58.19%	158,639	41.81%	113,969
Morgan	71.80%	4,708	28.20%	1,849
Morrow	71.33%	11,500	28.67%	4,622
Muskingum	67.44%	25,464	32.56%	12,294
Noble	71.24%	4,592	28.76%	1,854
Ottawa	63.81%	14,429	36.19%	8,182
Paulding	74.15%	7,218	25.85%	2,516
Perry	71.13%	10,567	28.87%	4,288
Pickaway	70.57%	15,670	29.43%	6,534
Pike	74.57%	9,069	25.43%	3,092
Portage	57.52%	42,828	42.48%	31,626
Preble	70.81%	14,593	29.19%	6,015
Putnam	77.67%	14,317	22.33%	4,117
Richland	68.16%	41,254	31.84%	19,274
Ross	68.66%	20,774	31.34%	9,483
Sandusky	67.14%	19,077	32.86%	9,336
Scioto	76.70%	26,401	23.30%	8,018
Seneca	66.05%	17,377	33.95%	8,931
Shelby	73.45%	16,445	26.55%	5,943
Stark	64.18%	118,809	35.82%	66,302
Summit	57.87%	153,894	42.13%	112,045
Trumbull	61.88%	64,823	38.12%	39,933
Tuscarawas	65.93%	27,623	34.07%	14,274
Union	70.58%	15,683	29.42%	6,536
Van Wert	75.14%	11,261	24.86%	3,726
Vinton	68.59%	4,010	31.41%	1,836
Warren	69.41%	63,431	30.59%	27,960
Washington	72.27%	20,940	27.73%	8,036
Wayne	66.91%	33,967	33.09%	16,798
Williams	72.56%	13,275	27.44%	5,019
Wood	59.36%	36,530	40.64%	25,014
Wyandot	71.77%	7,773	28.23%	3,057
