= Black card =

Black card may refer to:

- Black card, a penalty card issued by an official in several sports for infractions
- Centurion Card, a black-colored American Express charge card

== See also ==
- Blue Card (disambiguation)
- Carte blanche (disambiguation)
- Clubs (suit)
- Gold card (disambiguation)
- Green card (disambiguation)
- Palladium Card, now known as the J.P. Morgan Reserve Card
- Red card (disambiguation)
- Spades (suit)
- White card (taxi)
- White Card
