= Gold card =

Gold card may refer to:

== Banking ==
- American Express Gold Card
- A type of credit card

== Science and Technology ==
- A CPU upgrade card made by Miracle Systems in the 1980s and 90s
- An SD memory card for Android (operating system) based smartphones

== Other ==
- An annual travel card for the British railway network
- A type of card in the game Myths and Legends
- Gold pass, a privilege for Australian politicians, cancelled by Malcolm Turnbull; see Prime Minister of Australia
- SuperGold Card, commonly known as the "Gold Card", a concession card for senior citizens and veterans in New Zealand
- A type of Nol Card on the Dubai Metro
- Trump Gold Card, a type of United States visa
- MLB Lifetime Pass, a gold metal card issued to former Major League Baseball players and staff entitling them to free attendance to games.

== See also ==
- Black card (disambiguation)
- Carte Blanche (credit card)
- Palladium Card (now JPMorgan Reserve and Sapphire Reserve) and Sapphire Preferred credit cards from JPMorgan Chase
- Platinum Card, an elite credit card
