= Carolina Miranda =

Carolina Miranda may refer to:

- Carolina A. Miranda, columnist for the Los Angeles Times
- Carolina Miranda (actress) (born 1989), Mexican television actress
- Carolina Miranda (footballer) (born 1982), Spanish football midfielder
