= Centurion Card =

Invitation-only American Express charge card

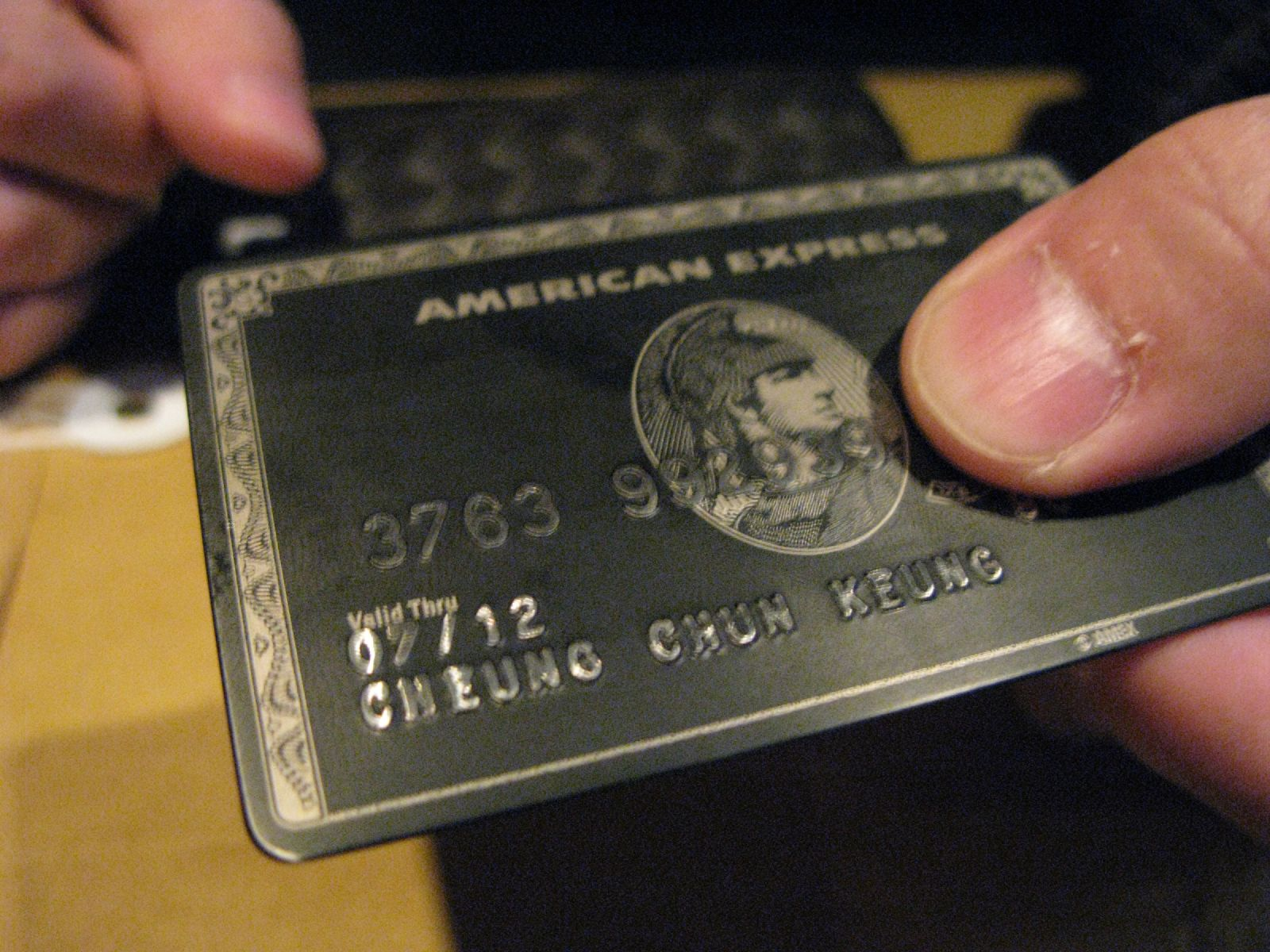
The front of an American Express Centurion card

The American Express Centurion Card, colloquially known as the Black Card, is an exclusive invitation-only charge card issued by American Express. It is reserved for the company's wealthiest clients who meet certain net worth, credit quality, and spending requirements on its gateway card, the Platinum Card. The firm does not disclose the exact requirements to receive an invitation to carry the card. The Centurion Card is minted out of anodized titanium, laser-engraved, and accented with stainless steel. The card reports to credit bureaus and does not maintain a pre-set credit limit. It is considered a status symbol among the affluent. Centurion Cards issued in the United States have an annual fee of $5,000.00 and a one-time initiation fee of $10,000.00 as of 2022.

== History ==
In 1988, an article in The Wall Street Journal newspaper reported that an exclusive black American Express membership card that was never advertised had been discontinued a year earlier. The article claimed that during a trial run that lasted almost four years, the card "was held by an ultra-select group of consumers who numbered fewer than 1,000 around the world." Lee Middleton, a spokesman for American Express, confirmed the card's existence to the Journal and said that it was given to clients who had a "substantial banking relationship" with American Express Bank Ltd., the New York parent of American Express's bank subsidiaries in Switzerland. Services included "dispatching limousines or helicopters for clients, booking their vacations and finding medical care in exotic places." Middleton said American Express abandoned the black card in 1987 because the newly introduced Platinum Card offered "95% of the black card's services." In 1999, American Express introduced the Centurion Card, a black charge card aimed at the company's wealthiest cardholders. Jerry Seinfeld claimed to be the first person to receive a Centurion Card, after contacting the company's president about the rumored existence of the black card.

I was waiting for [the crew] to move some cameras, and the crew guy comes up to me, he says, "You got the black card?" And I go "No, what’s the black card?" He says, "There’s only three in the world. The Sultan of Brunei has one, the president of American Express has one, and I thought you would have the third one." Next morning I call the president of American Express. I go, "Is there a black card?" He says, "It's just a rumor. It doesn't exist." He said, "But you know what? It's not a bad idea."

— Jerry Seinfeld, Comedians in Cars Getting Coffee, "A Hooker in the Rain"

Doug Smith, the director of American Express in Europe, told the fact-checking website Snopes.com that there "had been rumors going around that we had this ultra-exclusive black card for elite customers. It wasn't true, but we decided to capitalize on the idea anyway. So far we've had a customer buy a Bentley and another charter a jet." Snopes lists unverified descriptions of cardholder requests, such as dispatching a motorcycle rider to the shores of the Dead Sea to retrieve a handful of sand and couriering it back to London for a child's school project. In 2009, Luxury Card successfully registered "Black Card" as a U.S. trademark. American Express later sued as the name was similar to its Centurion Card, which it contended was widely known as the "Black Card." The U.S. District Court for the Southern District of New York ruled that Black Card, LLC's trademark of the name "Black Card" should be canceled on grounds that it was merely descriptive. As of 2019, it uses the registered trademark under license.

Since its introduction, the Centurion card has only been issued to clients invited by American Express to apply for it. The selection criteria the company uses to identify potential cardholders has been subject to speculation. Select media reports speculate an annual spending requirement of $500,000 to $1,000,000 on the Platinum Card to be considered for eligibility. In most countries where the card is issued, it is made of anodized titanium with the information and numbers laser etched into the metal. In some locations, such as Israel, EMV "chip" plastic cards, which also include the ExpressPay contactless payment technology, are issued. The Centurion Card comes in personal and business variants and with a Prada wearable.

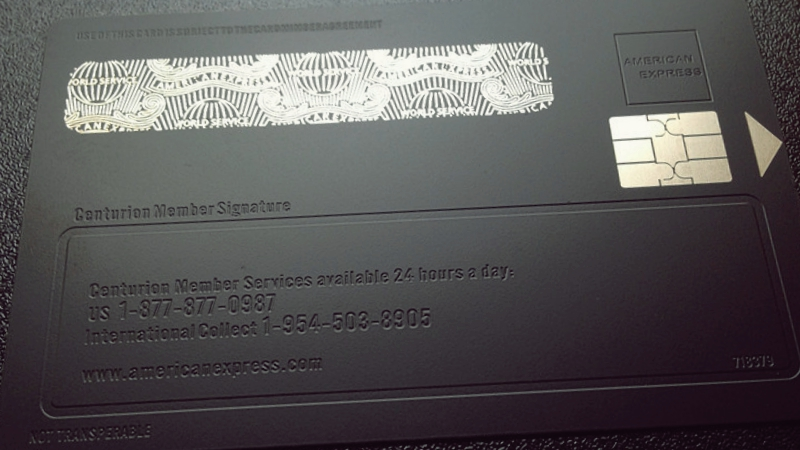
The back of a Centurion Card with EMV chip, 2010

The largest known purchase made with the Centurion card is the Nu couché painting by Amedeo Modigliani, which businessman Liu Yiqian bought for US$170,405,000 at a Christie's auction in New York in 2015.

== Features ==
=== Benefits ===
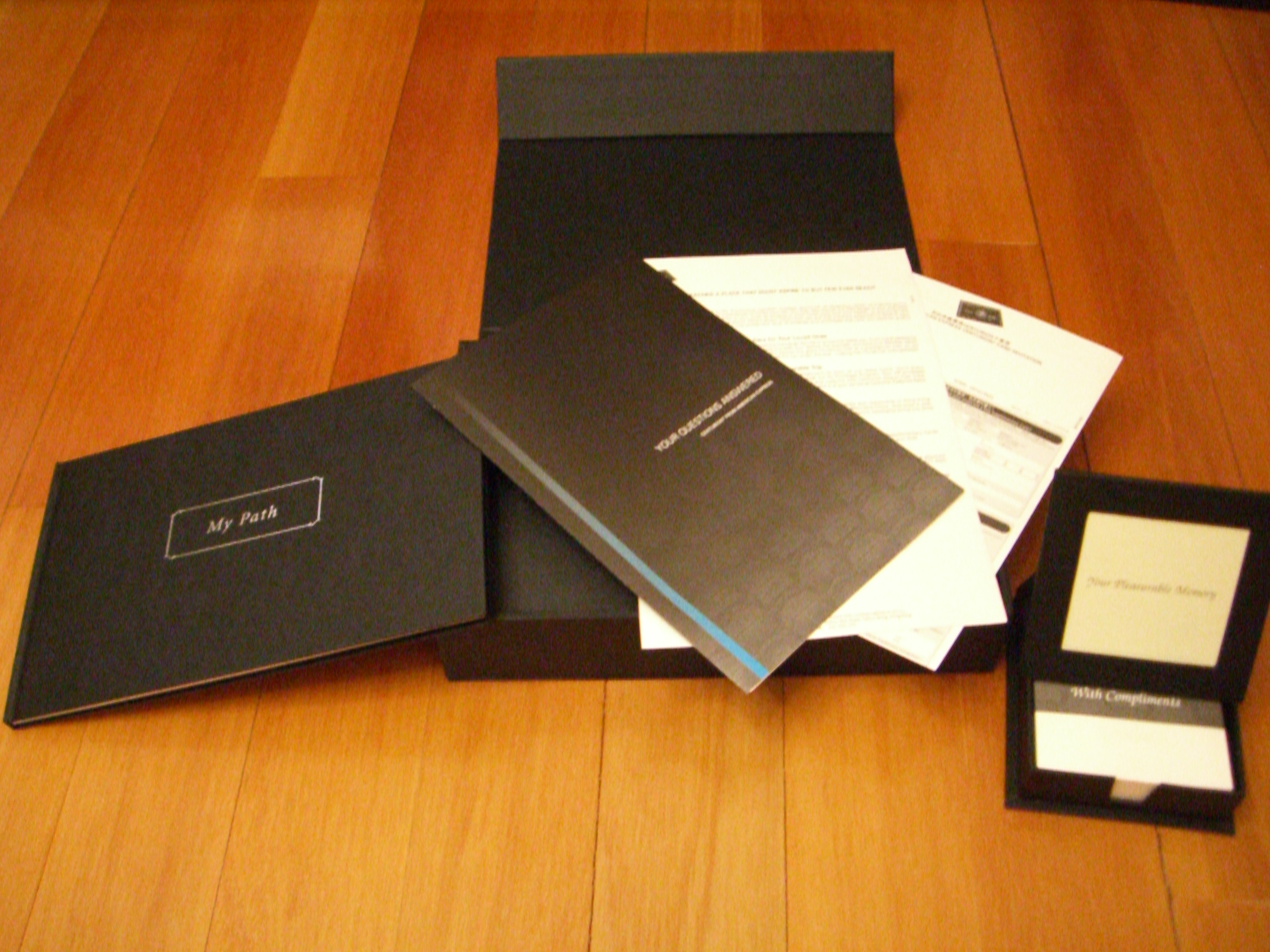
Centurion card invitation set

The card, available for personal and business use, offers services such as a dedicated concierge and travel agent; complementary companion airline tickets on international flights on selected airlines with the purchase of a full-fare ticket; personal shoppers at retailers such as Gucci, Escada, and Saks Fifth Avenue; access to airport clubs; first-class flight upgrades; membership in Sony's Cierge personal shopping program and dozens of other elite club memberships. Hotel benefits include one free night, when at least one paid night is booked during the same stay, in every Mandarin Oriental hotel worldwide once a year (except for the New York City property), and privileges at hotel chains like Ritz-Carlton, Leading Hotels of the World, and Amanresorts. The card also features complimentary enrollment in Easirent Car Hire Platinum Service and the Avis Rent a Car President's Club.

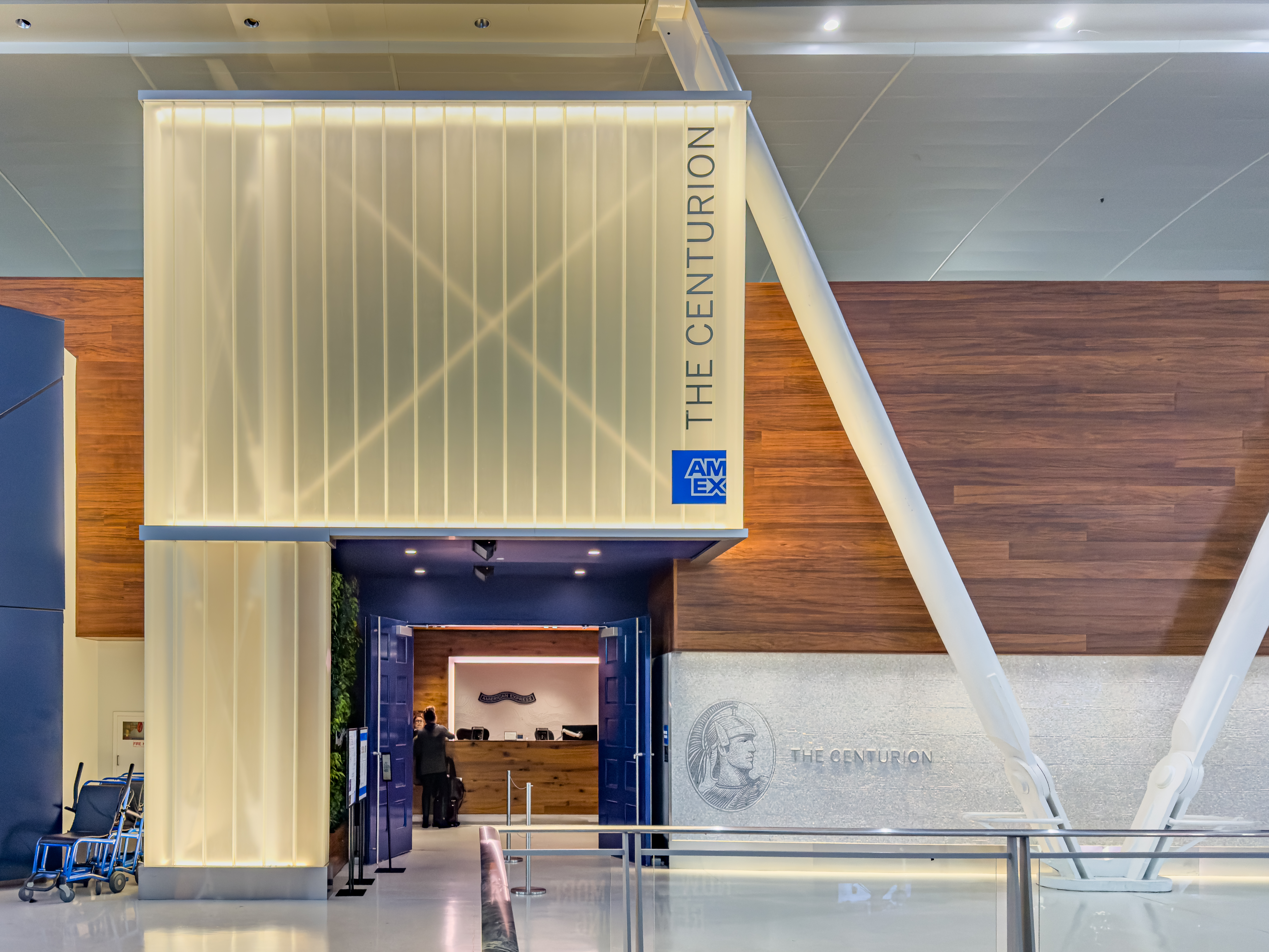
American Express Centurion Lounge at Terminal 4 in JFK Airport (2025)

Centurion Card members, like Platinum Card members, get complimentary access to the American Express Centurion Lounges at several US airports. They also get no pre-set credit limit, access to Priority Pass lounges around the world, plus additional lounge privileges based on the country their card is registered in. For example, Centurion cardholders in Canada also receive full access to Maple Leaf Lounges, a lounge network provided by Air Canada. At busy times, Centurion members have access to areas reserved for them. There are also drink options at the bar that are exclusive to Centurion members. As of 2015, they have a Champagne option of Veuve Clicquot and a single malt scotch by Balvenie. U.S. cardholders earn 1 Membership Rewards point per dollar on all eligible purchases.

=== Publications ===
Since the inception of the card, members have received a copy of Departures, which is also sent to all Platinum Card cardholders. In 2004, American Express Centurion members in the US began receiving an exclusive "no name" magazine, which was not available by any other means. Starting with the Spring 2007 edition, this magazine was officially titled Black Ink. The magazine is available only to individual Centurion cardholders, not to the business-edition customers. European, Asian, and Australian Centurion members receive quarterly the Centurion magazine published by Journal International GmbH (Munich, Germany). In June 2011, the Centurion magazine website was launched, offering daily updates for Centurion Card members. According to Journal International, the average age of a Centurion reader from Europe or the Middle East is 49 years. Centurion has been published since 2001 and has a circulation in Europe and the Middle East of 44,100; in Asia of 13,900; and in Australia of 6,000.

== In popular culture ==
The Centurion card is often considered to be a status symbol. The card is commonly associated with celebrities and the rich and famous. American Express does not disclose a list of Centurion cardholders, but a number of public figures have been associated with the card, including:

- Beyoncé
- Jeremy Clarkson (formerly)
- Mark Cuban
- Noel Gallagher
- John Mayer
- Oprah Winfrey
- Jerry Seinfeld
- Jeffrey Epstein

=== Film and television ===
The Centurion card has been used as an on-screen prop. In Quantum of Solace, James Bond hands a Centurion card to a travel agent with a private jet chartering company to pay for a flight to Bolivia. The payment is declined by MI6 as the intelligence service seeks to strip Bond of his duties and revokes his credit cards and passports. The Centurion replica used in the film was part of the Bond in Motion exhibition at the London Film Museum.

== See also ==
- J.P. Morgan Reserve Card
