= Green card (disambiguation) =

The green card is a document affirming the status of a person as a permanent resident of the United States.

Green card may also refer to:

== Sports ==
- Green card, in Association football, to signal permission to enter the field of play or, in the Italian leagues, fair play
- Green card, a warning card against further infractions by a field hockey player
- Green card, a warning card against further infractions by a Pride Fighting Championships competitor

== Other ==
- Green Card (film), a 1990 romantic comedy film
- Green card marriage, when two people marry in order to gain permanent residence in the US
- The Green card system: the European International Motor Insurance Card System, also based on a green card
- Green card (IBM/360), the shorthand "bible" for programmers during the late 1960s and 1970s
- "Green Card", a song by Oh Land from the album Wish Bone
- GreenCard, a smartcard ticketing system used by Metro Tasmania
- American Express Green Card, a charge card issued by American Express
- Green Card (Turkey), a document formerly issued to those without social security in Turkey

== See also ==
- Red Card (disambiguation)
- Blue Card (disambiguation)
- Yellow card (disambiguation)
- Green Card Fever, a 2003 Indian film
- Green card scheme in Odisha, family planning scheme in the Indian state of Odisha
