= White Card =

Right to work on construction sites in Australia

A White Card (also known as a General Construction Induction Card) is a mandatory work card required in Australia to order to work on a construction site.

== The White Card ==
=== Who needs the White Card? ===
The White Card is a required document for everyone wishing to work on the premises of a construction site. Additionally, it is also required for those not directly involved in building, such as supervisors, site managers, and people who routinely enter construction sites.

=== Validity ===
White Cards become void if no construction work is carried out in two consecutive years or more.

== Courses ==
The white card is gained by completing a face-to-face or online government mandated course through a (RTO) registered training organisation. The unit of competency required is CPCWHS1001 – Prepare to work safely in the construction industry.

The Card is, although it is issued by all the states by their own regulatory bodies, is valid across all Australia.

The White Card Online can be issued in Western Australia and Tasmania. In the other states, the course must be completed face-to-face. The face-to-face courses can be completed with 6 hours of face-to-face training. Regardless, this White Card is mutually recognised and accepted in all states of Australia.

=== Curriculum ===
Workplace safety, safe working practices, dealing with hazards and how to respond to an emergency.

==== Course Requirements ====
- Unique Student Identifier (USI) number
- Basic English language literacy
- Basic Mathematical literacy

==== Course by State ====
Abbrev	State	Issuing Body	Price
QLD	Queensland	WorkSafe QLD	$190
NSW	New South Wales	SafeWork NSW	$220
VIC	Victoria	WorkSafe VIC	$230
TAS	Tasmania	WorkSafe Tasmania	$39+$11.34
WA	Western Australia	WorkSafe WA	$39
SA	South Australia	WorkSafe SA	?
ACT	Australian Capital Territory	WorkSafe ACT	$42
NT	Northern Territory	?	$38.50

== History ==
This White Card Course replaces a range of state systems operating different coloured cards (Blue, Green, Red) and regulatory bodies. In the past the different states/regulatory bodies would have different coloured cards for their own state. Every State in Australia now operate with the Nationally Recognised White Card.

The white card online used to be offered in Queensland prior to 2019, however they changed to face-to-face only due to concerns of the mutual recognition by other states of the Queensland white card being at risk This was because allegedly the online courses offered for the Queensland white card were not up to standard.
