= Yellow card =

Yellow card may refer to:

- Yellow card (sport), shown in many sports after a rules infraction or, by analogy, a serious warning in other areas
- Yellowcard, an American alternative rock band
- Yellow Card Scheme, a United Kingdom initiative concerning reactions to medicines
- International Certificate of Vaccination or Prophylaxis, also known as Carte Jaune or Yellow Card, a vaccination certificate issued by the World Health Organization
- "Yellow card", colloquial name for the IBM System/370 Reference Summary booklet in the 1970s (earlier editions were colored green, or white for System/360, while subsequent releases were colored pink for XA and blue for ESA)
- A card, used with certain contracted IATSE touring shows, informing downline venues of the number of traveling and local stagehands needed to mount and stage the production
- Yellow ticket, a prostitution permit in the Russian Empire
- Standard American Yellow Card, a codification of the Standard American contract bridge bidding system by the American Contract Bridge League, originally printed on yellow paper
- Safeguarding guidance issued in the UK by The Scout Association
- Ethiopian Origin ID Card (Yellow Card), a document issued by Ethiopia to foreign nationals of Ethiopian origin

== See also ==
- Red Card (disambiguation)
- Blue Card (disambiguation)
- Green card (disambiguation)
