= Employment record book =

Type of personal document

An employment record book is an official personal document recording the employment status of its owner over time. Some European countries issue such documents, others did earlier. The first employment record books are said to have been issued in German Reich in 1892 in the mining industry.

== Brazil ==
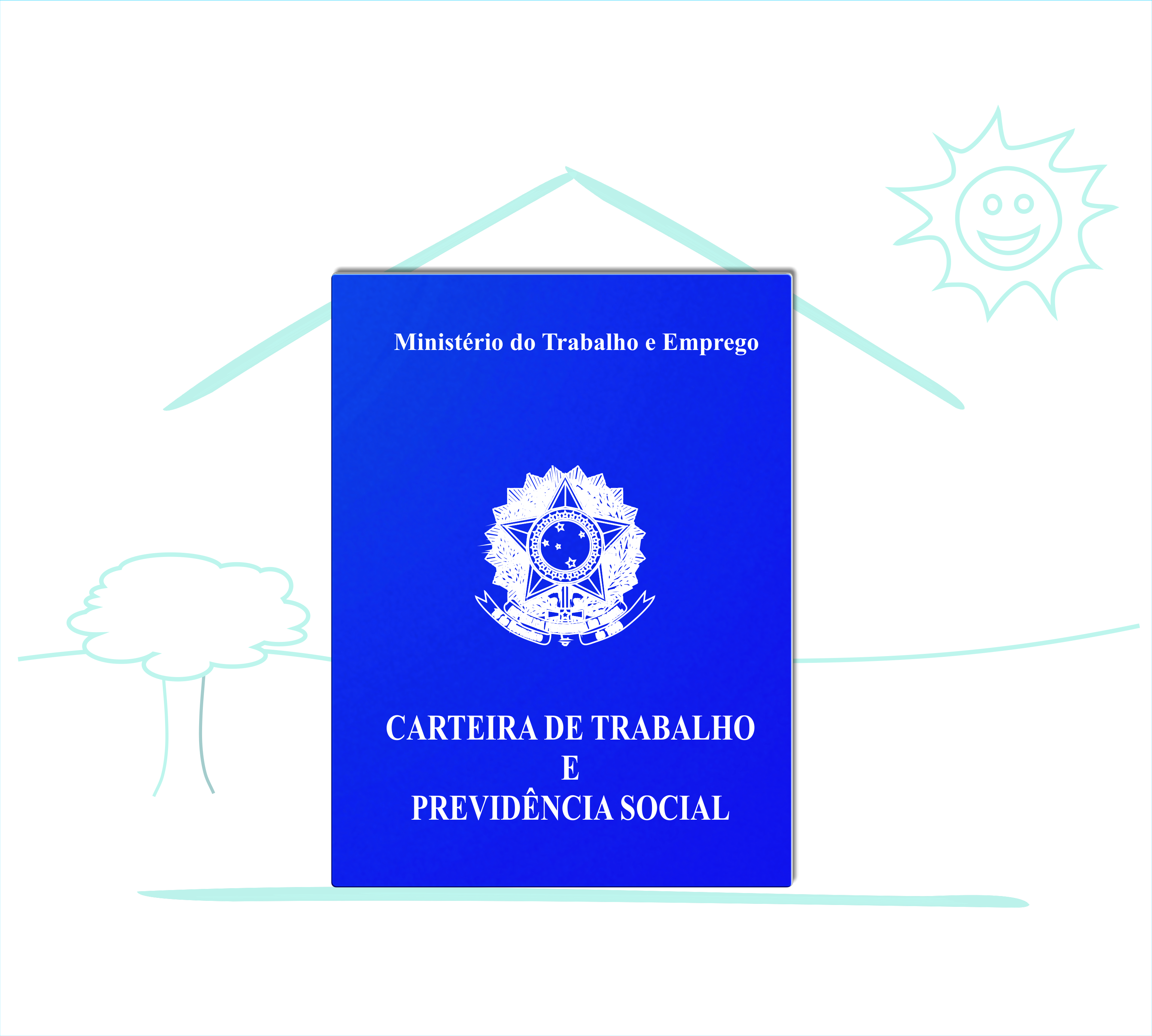
Brazilian "Carteira de Trabalho e Previdência Social"

The Carteira de Trabalho e Previdência Social ("Work and Social Security Booklet", CTPS in the Portuguese acronym) was created by the decree 21.175 on 21 March in 1932 and regulated by the decree 22.035 later in the same year. It ensures access to some of the main labor rights and social security network. In 1934 it was made mandatory for every employer to log in the worker's CTPS. It is considered to be a personal identification document, and also contains the registry of every employer, time of employment and wage.

Since 2018 it has a digital version that can be accessed on smartphones.

== France ==
Similar to an internal passport, French apprentices and labourers who travelled were required to show a ticket of leave from their employer, to avoid accusations of vagrancy. This requirement was introduced in 1749 and turned into a booklet in August 1781, the so-called livret d'ouvrier (labour booklet). The requirement was abolished during the French Revolution, only to be reintroduced on 12 April 1803. It was used during the reign of Napoleon, but the use declined gradually from 1860 under Napoleon III to 1890, when the requirement was abolished. The books were kept by the employer while the labourer was not travelling, but from 1854 it was left to the worker.

== Germany ==
=== 19th Century ===
German: Arbeitsbuch, lit. 'labour book'. The regulation for Arbeitsbuchs was issued on 24 June 1892 for the mining industry. The obligatory identification data required by the regulation included:

- The full name of the owner
- Date and location of his birth
- Name and the last place of the owner's father or guardian
- Owner's signature

All this data should be registered with a local police office, thus turning an Arbeitsbuch into a sort of internal passport identity document.

=== Third Reich ===
In the 1930s, Nazi Germany began their state-directed, distributed workforce with the rollout of record books containing indexes and employment information. Originally 'Labour Books' serviced both German citizens and foreign forced labour (Ostarbeiter) until 1943 when the 'Labour Book for Foreigners' (German: Arbeitsbuch für Ausländer) was mandated with an identification picture. Employers were to hold onto books and send workbooks and information to a central authority before employees could be allowed to change positions.

German employment record books / Deutsche Arbeitsbücher

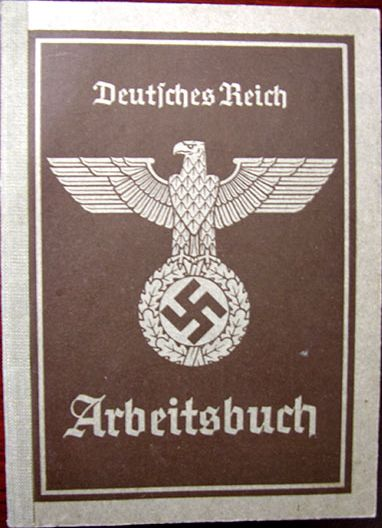
Common Arbeitsbuch.
German Reich, 1935–1945.

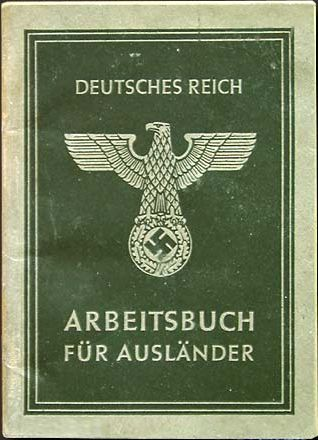
Arbeitsbuch for the foreigners.
German Reich, 1938–1945.

== Hungary ==
Several types of employment recording books existed in Hungary until 1950, when the unified recording book was introduced. The Austrian imperial patent of 1856 made the "servant" book mandatory, while other categories had their own employment records; from 1876 (XII.tvc) the written contract, the much-mentioned convention - "comment", which fixed the methods of remuneration and the conditions of work. In Hungary, the use of the (industrial) employment recording book was ordered by Act XVIII of 1884 (Industrial Act). Previously, the Kundschaft (apprenticeship certificate, release certificate) and the Wanderbuch (wandering book, wandering book) were used, which were issued by the guild master to the apprentice. In 1872, the guilds were abolished, and provisions were made for the establishment of industrial associations uniting former guild members who practiced the same crafts. It was made arbitrary in 1950 and abolished in 1992.

== Denmark ==
Danish: Skudsmålsbog, lit. 'character book' (or "conduct book"). The regulation for skudsmålsbøger was issued on 5 September 1832 for domestic workers. The book was generally issued at confirmation. When a domestic worker moved to a new town or parish, the local police or parish priest would sign the book, and when leaving a position, the master would attest the employment dates and wage (until 1867, he could also write a note about the quality of work). If the domestic worker lost the book, he or she would be fined. The final rests of the skudsmålsbog system were abolished in 1921.

Danish employment record books / Danske skudsmålsbøger

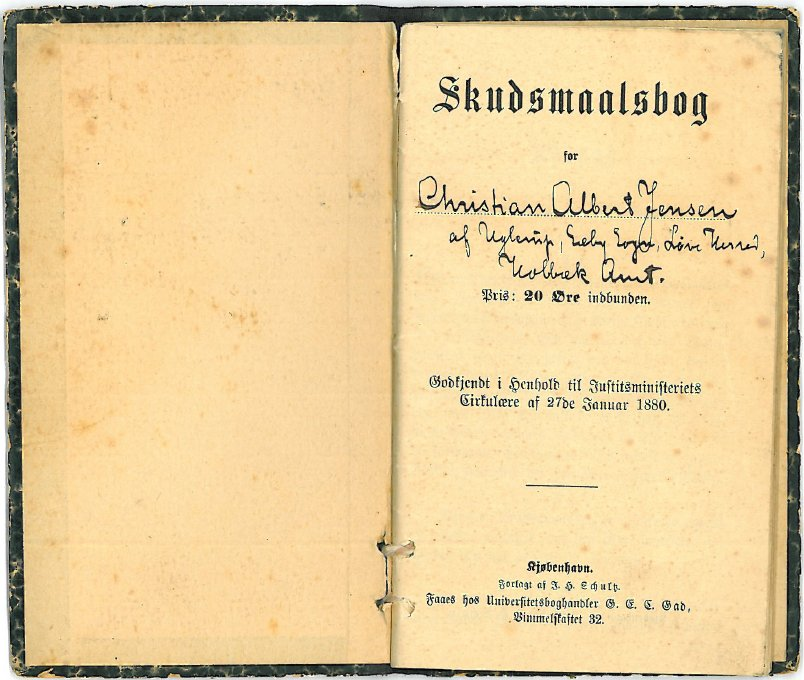
Skudsmålsbog from 1907.

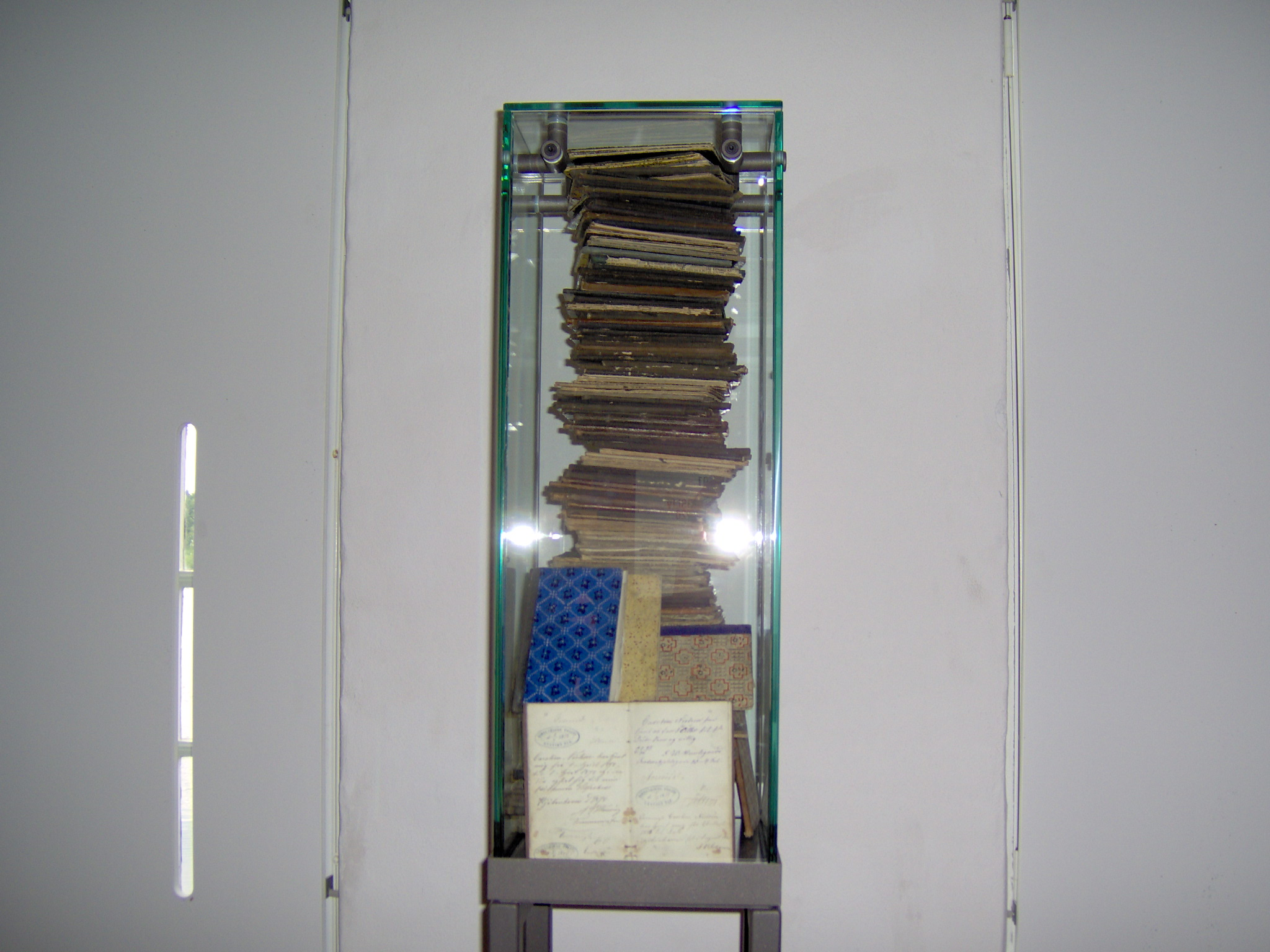
Skudsmålsbøger, exhibited at Brede Works.

== Italy ==
Italian: libretto di lavoro, lit. 'labour booklet'. The first comprehensive legislative act was adopted in Italy on 10 January 1935 (Italian: Istituzione del libretto del lavoro, legge n. 112). Soon after that Italy, whose citizens worked in Libya, transferred this organizational experience to that African country as well. In recent times a libretto del lavoro was issued by commune authorities in Italy; it was superseded by SIL (Sistema Informativa Lavoro) records, libretto del lavoro were abolished in accordance with a law n. 196/1997.

== Soviet Union and Russia ==
"Raschetnaya knizhka" (1912, Russian Empire).

Russian: Трудовая книжка, romanized: Trudovaya knizhka), plural трудовы́е кни́жки, literally "labour booklet". On 10 July 1918 the 5-th All-Russian Congress of Soviets adopted the Constitution of Russia which declared the right and duty to work for all citizen. Pursuant to this the All-Russian Central Executive Committee (VTzIK) approved the Labour Code (abbr. "KZoT") and the "Regulations on employment record books" as an Appendix to the Article 80 of this Code. Containing:

- Name, surname and date of birth of the labourer
- Name and address of the trade union which the labourer belonged to
- Waging category and level assigned to a labourer by a wage-rate commission

this "trudovaya knizhka" also supposed trailing benefits received by a labourer thereby also replacing a paybook (Russian: расчётная книжка), widely used in industry before the October Revolution of 1917. In addition, a special decree was issued on 25 June 1919. Although its title mentioned only Moscow and Petrograd, its text extended the requirements to all the citizen of Russia. The presence of passport was a due prerequisite for receiving the "trudovaya knizhka" which was issued in exchange of it (art. 3). Thus becoming the main identity document for its owner (although photo was not obligatory; art. 12), this "trudovaya knizhka" reserved pages for recording minor children. It also served as a paybook (art. 5); as place for labeling stamps for social insurance contributions (art. 8) and as a register for rationing coupons (art. 10).

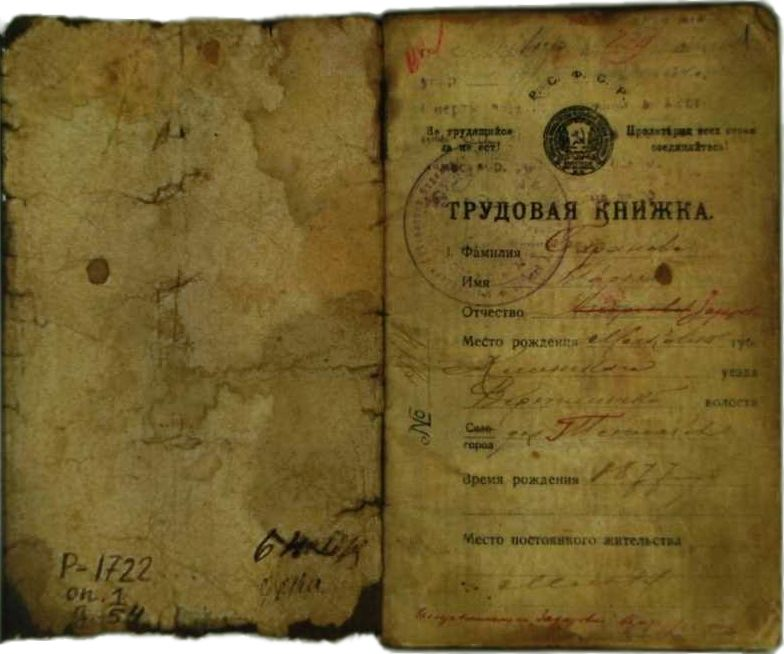
"Trudovaya knizhka" (1919, RSFSR).

On 9 July 1922 a new KZoT, and on 20 June 1923 the decree "On Identity Cards" were adopted. In 1924 "trudovaya knizhka" was replaced with Russian: Трудовая карта, romanized: trudovaya karta, lit. 'Employment Card'), register of data exclusively related to employment.

On 21 September 1926 the USSR Sovnarkom (SNK) required employers to maintain employment lists (Russian: Трудовой список, romanized: trudovoy spisok). Instead of employment cards employees were now to claim for excerpts (Russian: справка, romanized: spravka) from the employment lists at a place of their work.

Opening provisions of the 1938 decree introducing employment record books, reprinted in a later Soviet booklet.

By the Regulation of SNK as of 20 December 1938 "On Introduction of Employment Record Books" (Russian: О введении трудовых книжек) the latter returned into use from 15 January 1939. The new design of "trudovaya knizhka" was unified for all branches of industry, governmental and public bodies. From then on they again became the primary source for the calculations of:

- accumulated period of work (Russian: стаж, "seniority", an index used as a base for the calculations of current social benefits, like for temporary disability etc.) during the period of active labor
- amounts of the pensions, set upon reaching retirement age and in other cases

The last section of was "trudovaya knizhka" was reserved for records about material and moral encouragement, gratitudes, honorary titles, orders and medals etc. Penalties were not allowed to be recorded in these books.

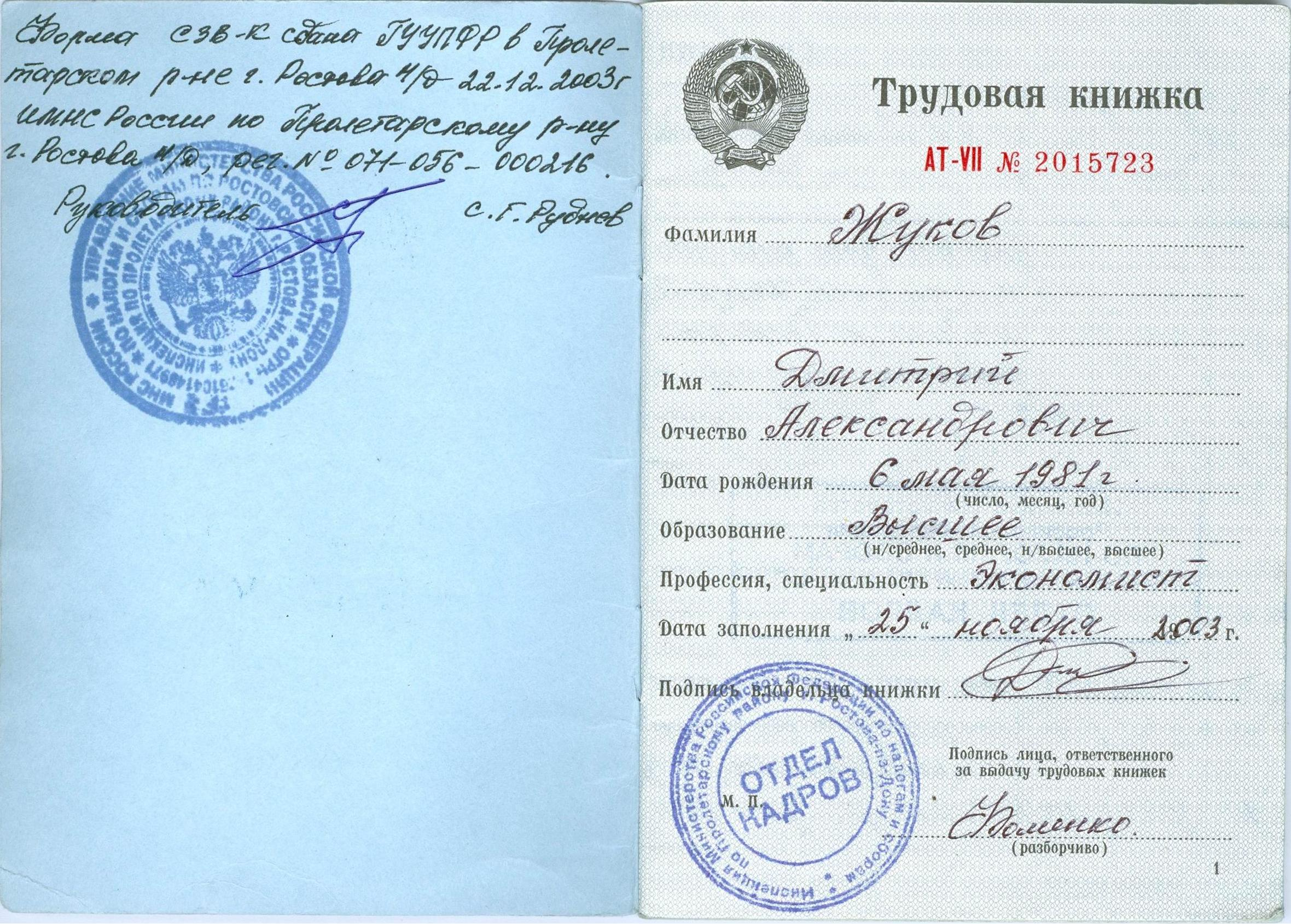
"Trudovaya knizhka" (1974, USSR).

The Trudovaya knizhka of 1974 series was issued in 15 different series, for each of the 15 republics. The issue for Russia (series AT) had 40 pages. Issues for the other republics had twice more, where page 41 in the middle was a duplicate title page written in the language of the relevant republic. Localized names of the document were: Ukrainian: Трудова́ кни́жка, Latvian: Darba grāmatiņa, Estonian: Tööhõive ajalugu etc.

In 1992 the issuing of employment record book was abolished and was re-introduced in 2002 with the new format carries double-headed eagle symbol on it.

Since 2020, Russian citizens can choose between electronic or paper form.

== Slovenia ==
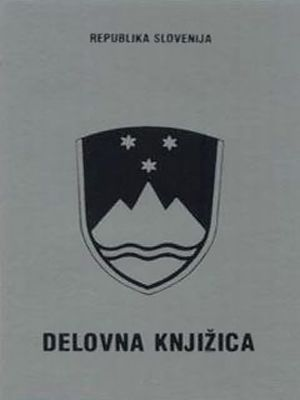
"Delovna knjižica". Slovenia.

Slovene: delovna knjižica, dual delovni knjižici, plural delovne knjižice, literally "labour booklet". The laws (Zakon 4.a "Pravilnik o delovni knjižici" of 5 August 1990, 6. člen; The Labour Relations Act of 1 January 2003 (ZDR, "Zakon o delovnih razmerjih Republike Slovenije", 225. člen) required the following obligatory identification data to be supplied with the application for "delovna knjižica":

- Surname and name
- Day, month and year of birth
- Name of the birth location (including the name of administrative unit and state)
- Type of residency in the Republic of Slovenia (permanent or temporary)
- Citizenship
- information on education, professional development and training
- EMŠO, ID (serial and registration number) of passport or other identity document, date and place of its issue; for foreigners – same data from a foreign travel document or identity card.

Applicants shall provide a blank "delovna knjižica" together with a duly filled application form.

The employee must provide employers his "delovna knjižica" at the conclusion of the employment contract, this requirement is obligatory prerequisite, and employer must confirm taking a booklet from applicant with a written acknowledgment of receipt.

The employer must keep "delovne knjižice" of his employees in custody during the whole period of their labour relationships. Employer also must return "delovna knjižica" back to the employee at his express request, against a written acknowledgment of receipt from his employee.

The ZDR Act (224. člen, odstavka 3) requires the employer to log the required data into "delovna knjižica". At the termination of the labour contract the employee must immediately receive his employment record book. In the case employer is unable to serve "delovna knjižica" within 30 days after the labour contract termination, it should be reported to the competent authority in a place of residence of the employee.

Databases from employment record books can be used by the authorized officials of the Ministry of Labour, the Labour Inspectorate and administrative units, when it comes to enforcement of statutory duties and sues.

At the end of 2008 it was announced that from 1 January 2009 "delovna knjižica" as the primary source of personal data for the social security issues shall cease its functions to ZPIZ (Slovene: Zavod za pokojninsko in invalidsko zavarovanje Slovenije, Pension and Disability Insurance Fund of Slovenia) database.

== See also ==
- Work card
