= Blue Card =

Blue Card may refer to:

- Blue card, a penalty card used in many sports
- Blue card, a permit for handgun-purchasing issued in Rhode Island
- The Blue Card, a non-profit organization dedicated to providing financial assistance to destitute Holocaust survivors in the United States
- Blue card (Australia), a system used in Queensland as a prevention and monitoring system for people working with children and young people
- Blue Card (European Union), an approved EU-wide work permit
- Blue Card (Turkey), a card provided to former Turkish citizens upon voluntary renunciation of the citizenship
- Blue card index system, a matrix of names used by Ulster loyalist Brian Nelson

== See also ==
- Red Card (disambiguation)
- Green Card (disambiguation)
- Yellow card (disambiguation)
