= Carolina A. Miranda =

American arts journalist

- Born: Casper, Wyoming
- Occupation: Art critic
- Writing career
- Notable awards: Rabkin Prize for Visual Arts Journalism

Carolina A. Miranda is an American arts journalist and columnist for the Los Angeles Times, where she writes the paper's Culture: High and Low blog. Her writing on art, architecture, creativity, and travel has appeared in national and international publications including Time, ARTnews, Architect, Art in America, Budget Travel, Centurion, Lonely Planet and Fast Company. She formerly published a personal arts and culture blog called C-Monster (2007–14).

== Early life and education ==
Miranda was born in Casper, Wyoming. In high school, she began transcribing interviews for journalist Robert Scheer. Initially she wanted to be a history professor, but realized that journalism was also a way of documenting history. When she attended Smith College, journalism as a major was not offered. Working on the college newspaper translated into an internship at the Massachusetts Hampshire Gazette, where she wrote about cultural events. In 1993, Carolina Miranda received her BA in Latin American studies from Smith College.

== Journalism career ==
After college, Miranda moved to New York, where she worked at New York Newsday. From 2004 to 2007, she worked at Time as a general assignment reporter, and from 2009 to 2012, she was a regular contributor at New York Public Radio.

In 2017, Miranda was one of eight writers awarded the Rabkin Prize for Visual Arts Journalism. The cash prize of $50,000 awarded by the Dorothea and Leo Rabkin Foundation, recognizes the "outstanding career contributions by art critics who inform the public through their writing on contemporary art and artists." A 2019 Neiman Foundation survey of more than 300 arts journalists ranked Miranda as one of the most influential critics alongside Roberta Smith, Jillian Steinhauer, Jerry Saltz, Ben Davis, Holland Cotter, and her Los Angeles Times colleague Christopher Knight.
