= Green card (IBM/360) =

Green card was the abbreviated name given to the IBM/360 Reference data card that served as the shorthand "bible" for programmers during the late 1960s and 1970s. It rapidly became an icon of the 360 era of programming and was later replaced by the "yellow card" for the IBM/370 product line. The same concept was also later used for an "orange card" for CICS application programming - that showed some internal CICS data structures and their relationships.

The card was published by IBM and was available by mail order directly from IBM, from university book stores associated with IBM 360 systems, some technical book stores, and other sellers of published technical material.

Page 8 of the card provides both the then mailing address to contact for pricing and the part number of GX20-1703.

== Card contents ==
The reference card contained details of all assembler instructions and other 360 "essential facts" condensed to a very convenient fold-up, pocket sized format:

- IBM/360 instructions (e.g. LR, ZAP, CLC)
- Assembler directives (e.g. START, CSECT, DC, LTORG, EQU, AIF, END)
- EBCDIC codes
- Condition code summary
- I/O "channel commands" for various devices
- Hexadecimal conversion
