= Work card =

Identity card showing right to work

A work card is like an identity card which verifies that a person has been given work, or is eligible to perform work in a given profession or jurisdiction. The work card is not a work visa, although it may be used in conjunction with a work visa, permanent resident card or other documentation.

Work cards are often used in countries with high unemployment to certify that the individual meets certain legal requirements (such as head of household, or with dependent children) making him or her eligible for work.

Work cards are also used in certain industries like construction (where specialized training and safety skills are required) or gambling (where background and credit checks are required to reduce the incidence of crime). In Brazil, workers' cards (carteira de trabalho) are signed by employers as a guarantee and recognition that workers are to receive rights and benefits. The cards differentiate employees who work on a cash basis from those who are entitled to receive protections like sick days, social security, and vacation days.

Work cards are used in some employment situations, such as prostitution, so that government officials may track the number of workers in a given industry. Frequent renewal of work cards may also be required to ensure that workers undergo regular health check-ups, or to gather information on working conditions or the incidence of crime (such as assault against the prostitute, or a prostitute's criminal background).

Work cards are increasingly used in the European Union (EU) to verify an individual's citizenship in a member-nation, and the kind of work which that individual may engage in. For example, citizens of states with provisional membership in the EU must obtain both an EU work card and a work card from a nation in which they wish to work.

In cases where a union has won the closed shop, a work card may be issued by a trade union. The work card will permit the non-union worker to work in the industry or for the employer with union permission.

== See also ==
- Work permit
- Employment record book
