= Red card =

A red card is a type of penalty card that is shown in many sports after a rules infraction.

Red card may also refer to:

== Art, entertainment, and media ==
- Red Card (album), 1976 release by Streetwalkers
- Red card, suit (cards) of hearts or diamonds
- Operation Red Card, 2006 Motion Picture Association anti-piracy drive in Asia
- RedCard 20-03, 2002 extreme football video game
- Red card trailer

== Credit cards ==
- American Express Red
- Target REDcard, issued by Target Corporation

== Legal ==
- Red card, in capital punishment in Iraq, a legal notice that execution is imminent
- Red Card Solution, a guest worker program proposal for immigration to the US, created by the Vernon K. Krieble Foundation and endorsed by Newt Gingrich in November 2011

== Work related ==
- Red card, Industrial Workers of the World membership card
- Red card, for wildland fire suppression, a U.S. professional certification

== See also ==
- Green Card (disambiguation)
- Blue Card (disambiguation)
- Yellow card (disambiguation)
