= Gun laws in Rhode Island =

Location of Rhode Island in the United States

Gun laws in Rhode Island regulate the sale, possession, and use of firearms and ammunition in the U.S. state of Rhode Island.

== Summary table ==
Subject / law	Long guns	Handguns	Relevant statutes	Notes
State permit required to purchase?	No	Yes	RI Gen. Stat. 11–47–35	All purchasers of handguns and ammunition must complete and pass a safety exam managed by the RI Department of Environmental Management, at which time they will receive a DEM issued pistol/revolver safety certificate, also known as a "blue card" allowing for purchase (R.I. Hunter Safety Education card is equivalent). Exempt are active duty military members, active and retired law enforcement officers, correctional officers, and persons licensed to carry a concealed handguns by RI Gen. Stat. 11–47–11.
Firearm registration?	No	No	RI Gen. Stat. 11–47–41	Explicitly illegal under state law.
Assault weapon law?	Yes	No	2025-S 0359A	An assault weapon purchase ban is set to take effect on July 1st, 2026. This law does not ban the possession of legally defined assault weapons, but instead bans their purchase, transfer, manufacture and sale within the state.
Owner license required?	No	No	None	“Blue card” certificate is required for purchase of ammunition and handguns, but no license is required for possession.
License required for concealed carry?	N/A	Yes	RI Gen. Stat. 11–47–8; RI Gen. Stat. 11–47–11; RI Gen. Stat. 11–47–18	Rhode Island is a hybrid "shall issue" and "may issue" state for carry. Licenses may be granted either by local authorities or by the state's attorney general's office. Licenses granted by local authorities are "shall issue" while those issued by the attorney general's office are "may issue" under state law. Until recently, most local authorities had been deferring to the attorney general which effectively blocks most issuance, unless one is a retired law enforcement officer. The practice of not issuing permits on a true "shall issue" basis has been the subject of recent litigation. In April 2015, the Rhode Island Supreme Court ruled that a police chief must accept and review carry permit applications and must render a decision and the reasons for that decision. More significantly, the court ruled that the issuing authority must "show cause" for denying an applicant a carry license. Permits issued by local authorities and the Attorney General's office are valid for concealed carry statewide.
License required for open carry?	No	Yes	RI Gen. Stat. 11–47–8; RI Gen. Stat. 11–47–11; RI Gen. Stat. 11–47–18; RI Gen. Stat. 11–47–51	Open carry of handguns permitted with a valid Rhode Island pistol permit. Locally issued permits do not expressly authorize open carry. Open carry of loaded long guns along public roadways is prohibited by law.
Vehicle carry?	No	Yes	RI Gen. Stat. 11–47–8	Permitted with a valid Rhode Island pistol permit for handguns. Non-residents may carry in a vehicle with a valid concealed carry permit issued by another state while traveling through Rhode Island without any intent to stop while in the state. Long guns must be unloaded.
Out-of-state permits recognized?	N/A	Vehicle carry only	RI Gen. Stat. 11–47–8	Non-residents may carry handguns in a vehicle with a valid carry permit issued by another state while traveling through Rhode Island without any intent to stop while in the state.
State preemption of local restrictions?	Yes	Yes	RI Gen. Stat. 11–47–58	
Castle Doctrine Law?	Yes	Yes	RI Gen. Stat. 11–8–8	No duty to retreat while in one's home.
NFA weapons restricted?	Yes	Yes	RI Gen. Stat. 11–47–8; RI Gen. Stat. 11–47–20	It is a violation of state law to possess any NFA weapon or silencers with the exception of Class III FFLs.
Peaceable Journey laws?	No	Yes	RI Gen. Stat. 11–47–8	One may possess a loaded handgun in a motor vehicle without a RI permit as long as one possesses a carry permit from another state and is merely transiting through Rhode Island without any unnecessary stops. Long guns must be unloaded while in a vehicle. FOPA is observed.
Background checks required for private sales?	Yes	Yes	RI Gen. Stat. 11–47–35; RI Gen. Stat. 11–47–8	For all firearm transfers, the buyer must pass a background check conducted by the police department in their home municipality. Exempt are active law enforcement officers and those licensed to carry a concealed firearm by RI Gen. Stat. 11–47–11.
Red flag law?	Yes	Yes	RI Gen. Stat.8–8.3	The police may petition the Superior Court to issue an extreme risk protection order if they receive credible information of a significant and imminent risk. A judge may issue a temporary gun-removal order, but a hearing is required within 14 days to determine if a one-year ban on buying or possessing a firearm is warranted. Some localities have adopted Second Amendment sanctuary resolutions in opposition.
Waiting period?	Yes	Yes	RI Gen. Stat. 11–47–35	After purchasing a firearm, the waiting period before the buyer can take possession is 7 days. Exempt are active law enforcement officers and those licensed to carry a concealed firearm by RI Gen. Stat. 11–47–11.

== State constitutional provisions ==
Article I, Section 22 of the Constitution of Rhode Island states:

"The right of the people to keep and bear arms shall not be infringed."

== Permitting system ==
Rhode Island is a hybrid shall/may issue permitting state. The licensing authorities of each town or city (police chief or town council if the locality has no police force) is given the authority to grant carry licenses on a shall-issue basis but until recently, many police chiefs and town officials had refused to issue. Often an applicant will be referred to the Attorney General’s office which is a "may issue" licensing authority. In practice, carry permits have been very hard to obtain from the Attorney General's Office under their strict interpretation of "proper showing of need", which has only become stricter under the current Neronha administration who will only issue to those who can prove a specific threat to the applicant's life, have a work related purpose (security guard) or are a former police officer.

However, the "shall" nature of the applicable statute is confusing, stating that the applicant should have "good reason to fear an injury to his or her person or property or has any other proper reason for carrying a pistol or revolver". Some local police chiefs disregard the "other proper reason" clause and require a letter of need. Most local police chiefs also use the Attorney General’s application (which does require need) and thus the chiefs simply follow suit. These towns have been known to require additional requirements that are not included in state law such as attending a firearm safety course, acquiring notarized reference letters, and re-qualifying with the caliber you wish to carry every time you renew. State law does, however, require an applicant for either permit to pass a skill test using the Army-L target at 25 yards, to be certified by a police official, National Rifle Association or United States Revolver Association Certified Instructor. In most cases, the Attorney General will not issue a permit unless the demonstrated need is extremely convincing (work purposes, threat to one's life, etc.). Upon denial, applicants are offered the opportunity to appeal, requiring an interview with Bureau of Criminal Investigation staff. This often results in the issuance of a restricted permit, often for target range use. However, state law does not grant the AG the authority to issue restricted permits and state law explicitly states that carrying a firearm to a target range does not require a permit.

=== Recent Developments in license to carry policies ===
In April 2015, the Rhode Island Supreme Court ruled that local police chiefs must issue licenses to carry to qualified applicants (e.g., those who pass a background check and complete the required firearms skill training). The ruling further states that local issuing authorities must "show cause" if an applicant is denied a permit to carry, and that simply stating the applicant is "not suitable" without substantive justification is no longer a valid reason for the denial of a carry license.

In June 2022, the United States Supreme Court ruled in New York State Rifle & Pistol Association, Inc. v. Bruen that the proper cause requirement in New York law for concealed pistol licenses was unconstitutional. In response, Rhode Island Attorney General Peter Neronha issued a statement stating that Rhode Island was already in compliance with the Bruen decision since current Rhode Island law already requires local authorities to issue on a "shall-issue" basis as required by Bruen. He additionally stated that since Rhode Islanders have a method of acquiring concealed carry licenses without a showing of need or proper cause, he could continue requiring a "showing of need" for carry permits issued by his office.

Non-resident permits can be issued by both the Attorney General's office and the local authorities of any town or city under 11–47–11, however, many localities refuse to issue to anyone who does not reside within their city or town, and instead direct them to the Attorney General in violation of state law.

== Castle law ==
Rhode Island has a moderately strong castle law, limited to the inside of a dwelling, with no duty to retreat.

== Red flag law ==
Under the state's red flag law, the police may petition the Superior Court to issue an extreme risk protection order if they receive credible information of a significant and imminent risk. A judge may issue a temporary gun-removal order, but a hearing is required within 14 days to determine if a one-year ban on buying or possessing a firearms is warranted.

== Waiting period ==
After purchasing a firearm, the waiting period before the buyer can take possession is 7 days, unless the buyer is an active-duty law enforcement officer or possesses a locally issued concealed carry permit.
