= Centurion (magazine) =

American quarterly lifestyle magazine

- Editor-in-Chief: Christian Schwalbach
- Categories: Lifestyle magazine
- Frequency: Quarterly
- Publisher: Journal International
- Founded: 2000; 26 years ago
- Company: American Express Services
- Country: Germany
- Based in: Munich
- Language: Six different languages
- Website: centurion-magazine.com

Centurion is a quarterly lifestyle magazine published in Munich, Germany. The quarterly is one of the three magazines offered to the American Express members. Centurion is specifically for Centurion Card members.

== History and profile ==
Centurion was established in 2000. The magazine has been owned by the American Express and published by the Journal International since then. The company also publishes Departures, a quarterly magazine for American Express Platinum card members.

The headquarters of Centurion is in Munich and the quarterly covers news about luxury, travel, culture, fashion and jewellery, tourist destinations, art and gourmet trends. It is published in six different languages on a quarterly basis.

The publisher describes Centurion as "the encyclopaedia of luxury." Christian Schwalbach is the editor-in-chief of the 120-page quarterly.

As of 2013, Centurion had 17 editions. The magazine is published in the Europe, Middle East, Asia-Pacific and Latin America regions and mailed to Centurion members of American Express.

In June 2011, Centurion launched its website and was relaunched in November 2013.

The magazine had a circulation of 61,600 copies in 2010. In 2012, the circulation of the Asia edition of Centurion was 19,600 copies.
