= Priority Pass =

Airport lounge program

- Founded: 1992; 34 years ago
- Number of locations: 1,800+ (2025)
- Owner: Collinson Group
- Website: prioritypass.com

Priority Pass is a program owned by Collinson Group that provides members with access to a network of 1,800+ airport lounges and travel experiences in over 725 airports in 145 countries, helping to elevate travellers' journeys. Founded in 1992, Priority Pass is the world’s original and leading airport experiences programme.

Priority Pass offers three classes of memberships directly from its website, including Standard, Standard Plus, and Prestige, which each provide different levels of access. A fourth class of membership, Select, is included with certain credit cards.

The program started adding services at airports other than lounges in 2017, including dining, retail, sleep, spa, airport transfer, car rental and complimentary fitness memberships.
