= Airport lounge =

Air travel amenity

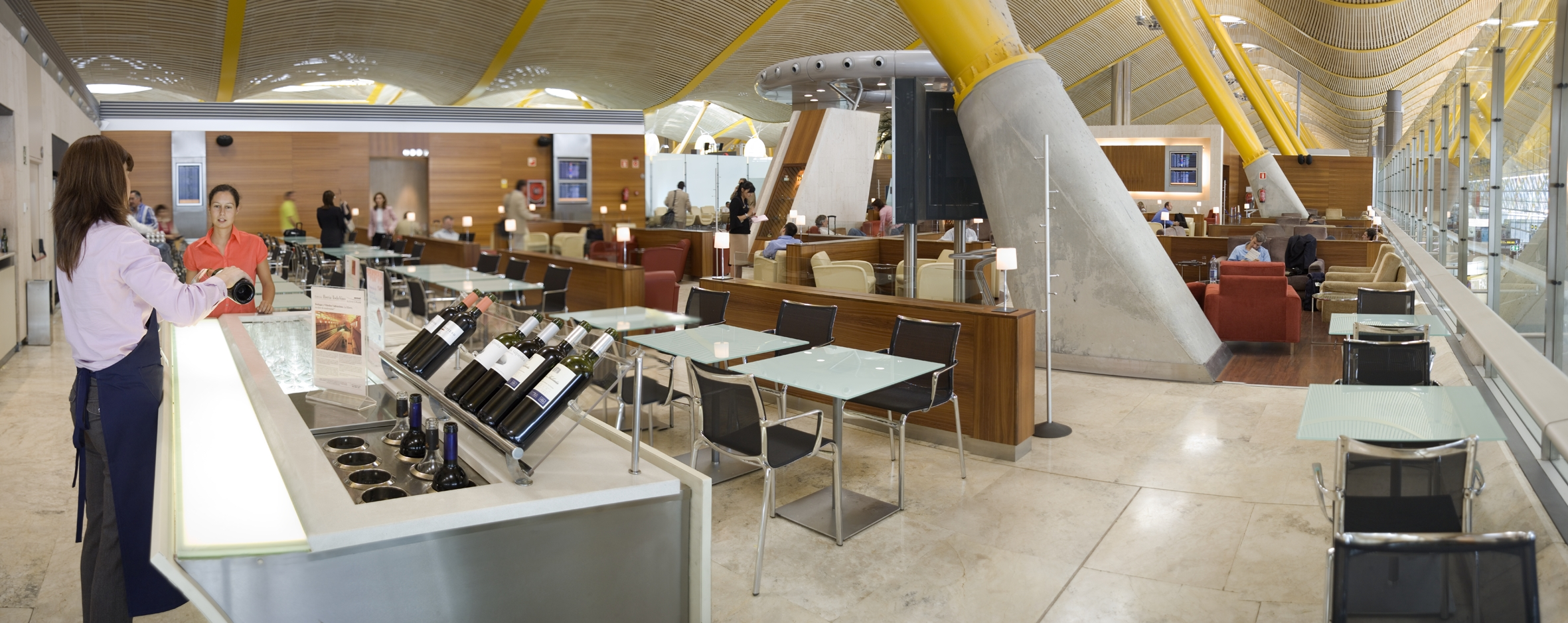
An airport lounge in the Adolfo Suárez Madrid–Barajas Airport

An airport lounge is a facility operated at many airports. Airport lounges offer, for selected passengers, comforts beyond those afforded in the airport terminal, such as more comfortable seating, quieter environments, and better access to customer service representatives. Other accommodations may include private meeting rooms, telephones, wireless internet access and other business services, along with provisions to enhance passenger comfort, such as free drinks, snacks, magazines, and showers.

The American Airlines Admirals Club was the first airport lounge when it opened at New York City's La Guardia Airport, in 1939. Then AA president, C. R. Smith, conceived it as a promotional tool.

== Types ==
=== Airline lounges ===
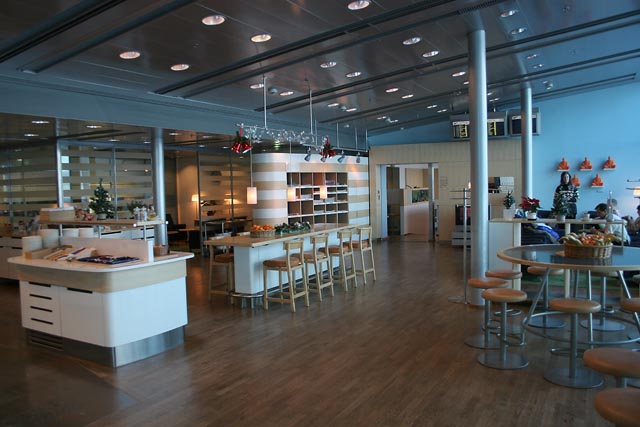
A standard SAS business lounge at Helsinki-Vantaa Airport, Finland

Airlines operate airline lounges as a service to premium passengers, usually passengers flying first class and business class, with high level frequent flyer status, and premium travel credit card memberships.

Most major carriers have one or more lounges in their hubs and focus cities as well as in the major airports they serve. The major US airlines—American (Admirals Club), Delta (Delta Sky Club), and United (United Club)—operate dozens of lounges, while smaller airlines like Alaska Airlines (Alaska Lounge) tend to only operate a handful of lounges in their hub and focus cities.

Airlines outside of Australia and North America generally do not sell lounge memberships, and instead reserve lounge access exclusively for very frequent flyers and passengers in premium cabins. However, a passenger who has a lounge membership in an airline in one of the three major airline alliances (Oneworld, SkyTeam, or Star Alliance) may have access to the lounges of the other members of that alliance. For example, Qantas Club membership provides access to the Admirals Club lounges due to a reciprocal arrangement with American Airlines; similarly, a member of the United Club or other Star Alliance members can access lounges of Air Canada and Air New Zealand.

It is, however, not uncommon for non-alliance members to agree individually to allow usage of each other's lounges. For example, although Alaska Airlines operates just nine Alaska Lounges, its members have access to American Airlines Admirals Club (and vice versa). While Alaska Airlines is now part of the Oneworld alliance, this arrangement predated their membership.

Several credit card companies offer their own branded lounges accessible to certain cardholders. American Express operates Centurion Lounges in the United States as well as HKG. JPMorgan Chase and Capital One have announced plans to open their own lounges for cardholders.

=== Pay-per-use lounges ===
Private companies, such as Airport Dimensions by Collinson Group, Aspire Lounges by Swissport, Plaza Premium Lounge, and Global Lounge Network, also operate generic pay-per-use lounges. In contrast to airline lounges, these facilities are open to any traveller traversing the airport, regardless of class of ticket or airline, subject to payment of a fee. Most only offer day passes, but some also offer yearly and lifetime memberships. Access to the lounges can be booked via online platforms such as LoungeBuddy or, in limited cases, one-day passes can be purchased directly at the lounge entrance.

=== First class airline lounges ===
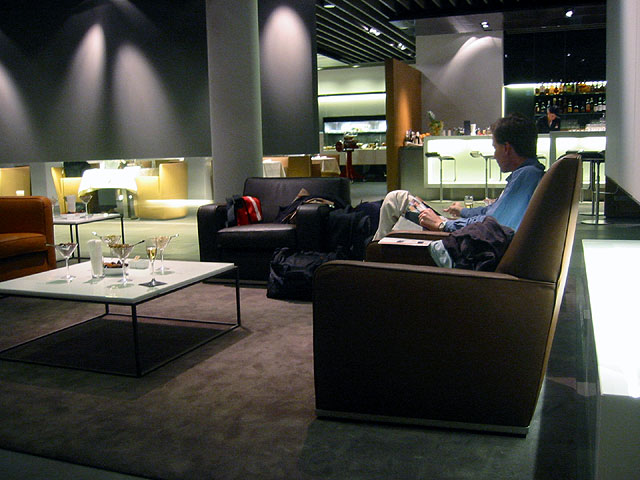
The Lufthansa First Class lounge at Frankfurt International Airport, Germany

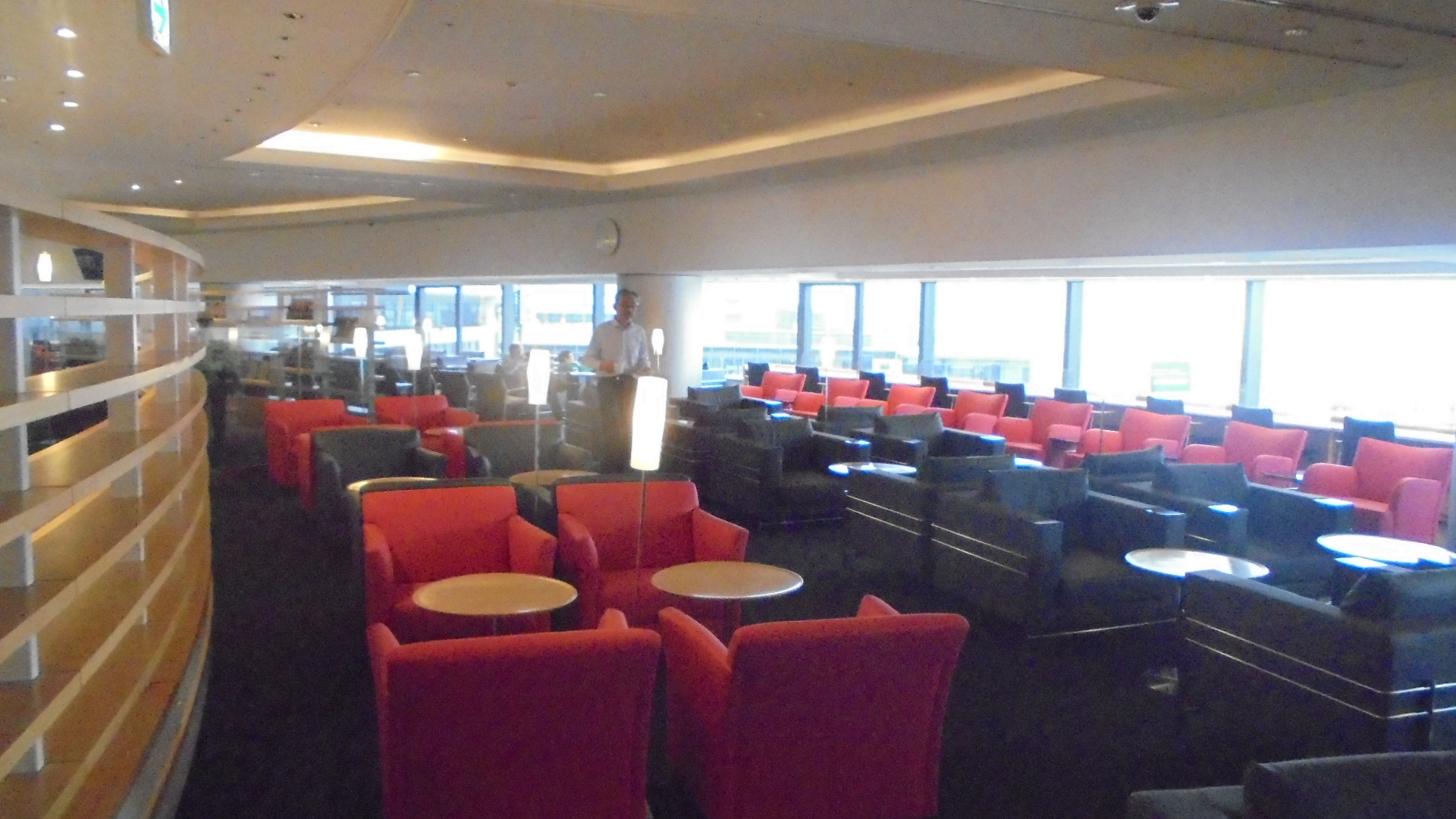
Delta Sky Club Lounge at the Narita International Airport Japan

For many airlines, a first class lounge will also be offered to international first class and top-tier passengers. First class lounges are usually more exclusive and will feature extra amenities over business class that are more in line with the European/Asian concept of an airport lounge. In the few cases where an amenity is offered only in the business class lounge, first class passengers are permitted to use the business lounge if they wish. In any case, anyone with first class lounge access almost automatically has access to the business class lounge—such as if a traveling companion is not in first class and cannot be brought into the first class lounge as a guest. In most cases, airlines will offer first class passengers a free pass to their standard airport club. Some airlines offer "arrival lounges" for passengers to shower, rest, and eat after a long-haul international flight.

=== Invitation-only lounges ===
A small number of airlines operate lounges that cannot be entered by paying a fee, by frequent-flyer status or by travelling in a premium cabin; admission is by invitation, at the airline's discretion. Qantas operates the Chairman's Lounge, a network of six lounges behind unmarked entrances at the domestic terminals of Sydney, Melbourne, Brisbane, Adelaide, Canberra and Perth. It was established in the 1980s by Australian Airlines and passed to Qantas when the two carriers merged in the early 1990s. Membership is approved by senior executives; the airline's former chief executive Alan Joyce has written that "you cannot buy your way in". Virgin Australia opened comparable invitation-only "Beyond" lounges in Melbourne, Sydney and Brisbane in 2022. American Airlines, Delta Air Lines and United Airlines maintain unpublished invitation-only frequent-flyer tiers—ConciergeKey, Delta 360° and Global Services—which carry enhanced airport services but not, as a rule, dedicated lounges.

Because such memberships are conferred rather than bought or earned, their extension to public office-holders has attracted scrutiny, particularly in Australia. Qantas told a Senate committee in 2023 that Chairman's Lounge membership was offered to Australian Public Service officers of Senior Executive Service Band 2 and above, to departmental secretaries and their deputies, and to the chairs, chief executives and commissioners of Commonwealth agencies. Members also included all seven judges of the High Court of Australia—which said it had disclosed this to the parties in a case involving the airline, without objection—and senior officers of two of the airline's regulators. An analysis of the parliamentary register of interests published in 2024 counted 122 of the 151 members of the House of Representatives and 59 of the 76 senators as members.

Assessments of the practice have varied. The corruption researcher Adam Graycar said that "the nature of corruption is really about buying access", and suggested that politicians pay for membership rather than be barred from it; the transport economist Rico Merkert said it was "not impossible" that such benefits had assisted Qantas, but that any connection was "impossible to know". Qantas has declined to comment on the lounge, and Joyce wrote in a 2026 memoir that the suggestion that the airline used membership to exert influence was "the wildest assertion". The Australian Public Service Commission directed agency heads in October 2023 to record gifted lounge memberships in their agencies' gift registers, and the 2026 federal budget ended publicly funded lounge memberships for public servants. Similar questions have arisen in New Zealand, where lounge access given to members of parliament by Air New Zealand is not recorded in the register of pecuniary interests.

== Access to lounges ==
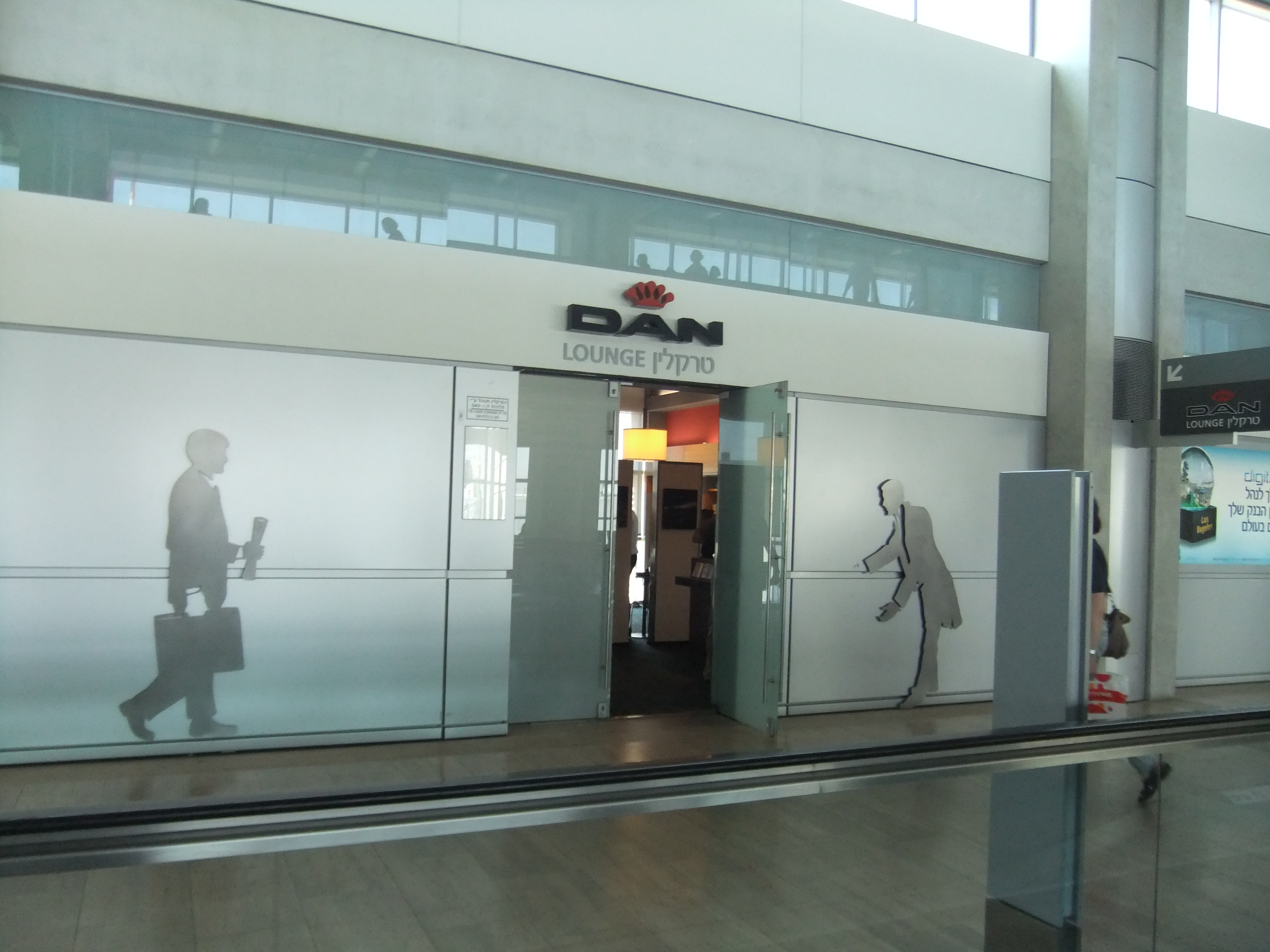
Entrance to the Dan Lounge in Ben Gurion Airport, Israel. The Dan Lounge is accessible to passengers of various airlines, holders of various membership schemes, and paying passengers.

Access to airport lounges may be obtained in several ways. In Australia, Canada, and the United States, a common method to gain access is by purchasing an annual or a lifetime membership, while in Asia and Europe this is usually impossible. Membership fees are sometimes discounted for elite members of an airline's frequent flyer program and may often be paid using miles. Certain high-end credit cards associated with an airline or lounge network, such as the Chase Sapphire Reserve, Delta Reserve, and United MileagePlus Club credit cards, include membership to Priority Pass and associated lounge access for as long as one owns the card.

Lounge access can also be attained with an airline status card, which is common in Europe. The top frequent-flyer levels often offer access to any of an airline's lounges or partner airlines' lounges, when traveling in any class of travel on any of the partner airlines (usually it is required for the cardholder to be booked on one of the carrier's flights within the next 24 hours). Most airlines also usually offer free lounge access to anyone in their premium cabins (first class or business class) on their days of travel; in North America this is usually only available to passengers on intercontinental or transcontinental flights.

Pay-per-use lounges can be accessed by anyone, irrespective of airline or flight class. Some offer further benefits when booking directly with them rather than through a reseller.

Independent programs, such as Collinson's Priority Pass, offer access to selected airline lounges for an annual fee, while Go Simply, Holiday Extras, LoungePass, and some offerings by independent and airline lounge programs offer pay per use and/or prebookable access without need for membership. Premium credit and charge cards may also offer lounge programs for members. Some banks, like ABN Amro and HSBC, offer lounge access for premium clients. American Express also offers access to lounges belonging to Priority Pass and is expanding its own line of lounges.

Airport lounges can be pre-booked through a travel provider, along with additional ancillary travel services such as airport parking, hotel bookings, and fast-track security passes, to ensure a comfortable travel experience from start to finish.

== Amenities ==
Besides offering more comfortable seating, lounges usually provide complimentary alcoholic and non-alcoholic beverages, and light snacks such as fruit, cheese, soup, pastries and breakfast items. In the United States and Canada, nearly all domestic lounges offer an open bar for domestic beer, house wine and well liquor. In the United States, premium beverages such as imported beer, top-shelf liquor, high end wines and champagne are often available for purchase. In U.S. states where open bars are prohibited by law, non-premium beverages may be sold at a token rate (e.g. $1 per drink).

Other amenities typically include flight information monitors, televisions, newspapers, and magazines, plus business centers with desks, internet workstations, telephones, photocopiers and fax services. Complimentary wireless Internet access for patrons is also common.

In Asia, Europe and the Middle East, lounges (especially those for first class passengers) can be quite luxurious, offering an extensive premium open bar, full hot and cold buffet meals, cigar rooms, spa and massage services, fitness centers, prayer rooms, private cabanas, nap suites and showers.

Some lounges have pool tables as amenities. Additionally, there are wireless charging stations in lounges, at some airports in London, installed by Nokia.

== Lounges in other modes of transport ==
Facilities similar to airport lounges can be found in large train stations (such as Amtrak's ClubAcela lounges or the DB Lounge offered by Deutsche Bahn), mainly for first-class inter-city rail, high-speed rail or night train passengers. In the case of Frankfurt Airport and Frankfurt Airport long-distance station both the airport and the train station serving it have lounges for their respective premium passengers. Given that DB and Lufthansa offer combined air-rail alliance tickets, it is possible for the same ticket to qualify for lounge access in both.

== Gallery ==
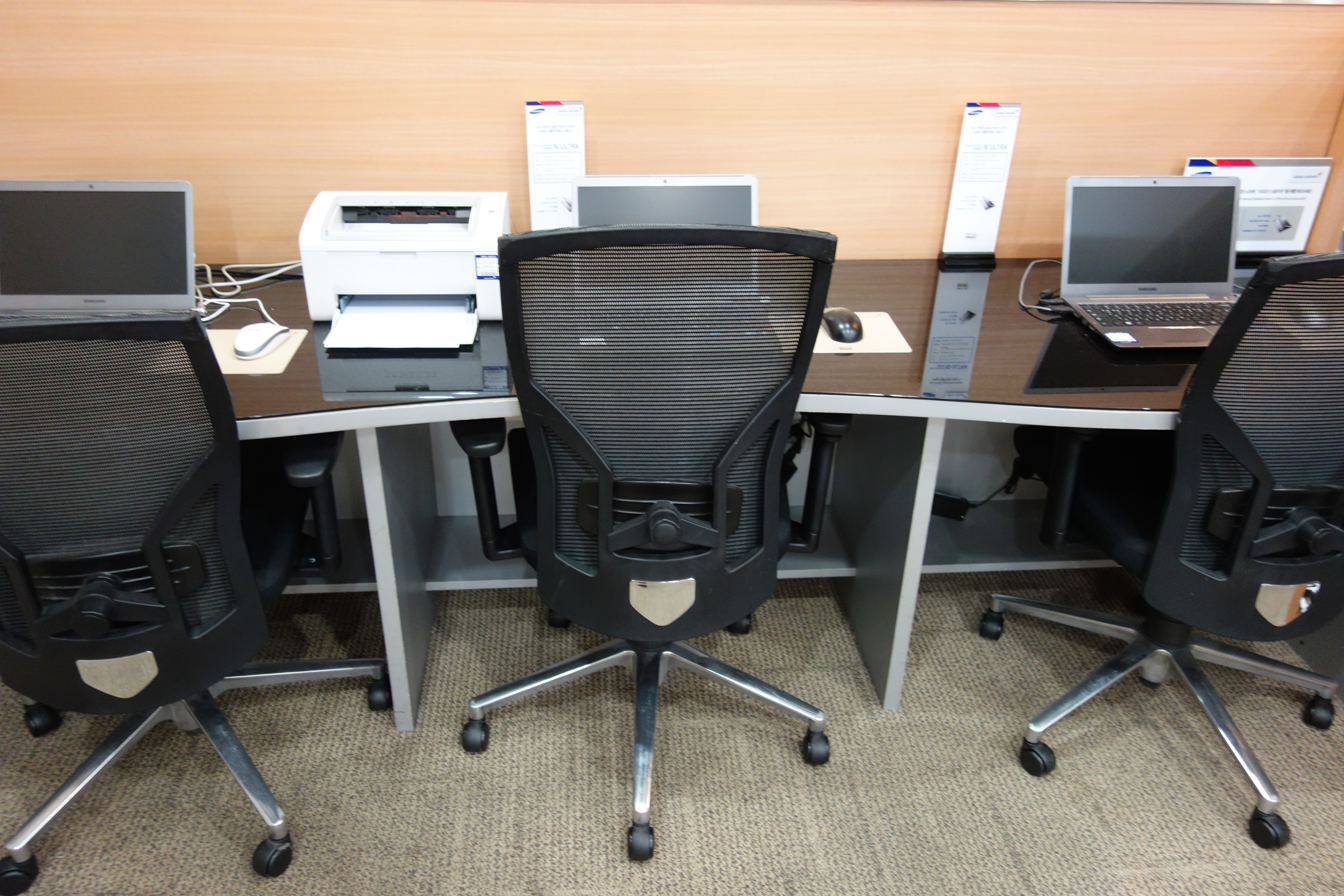
Computer work stations at the Asiana business class lounge at Gimhae International Airport in South Korea

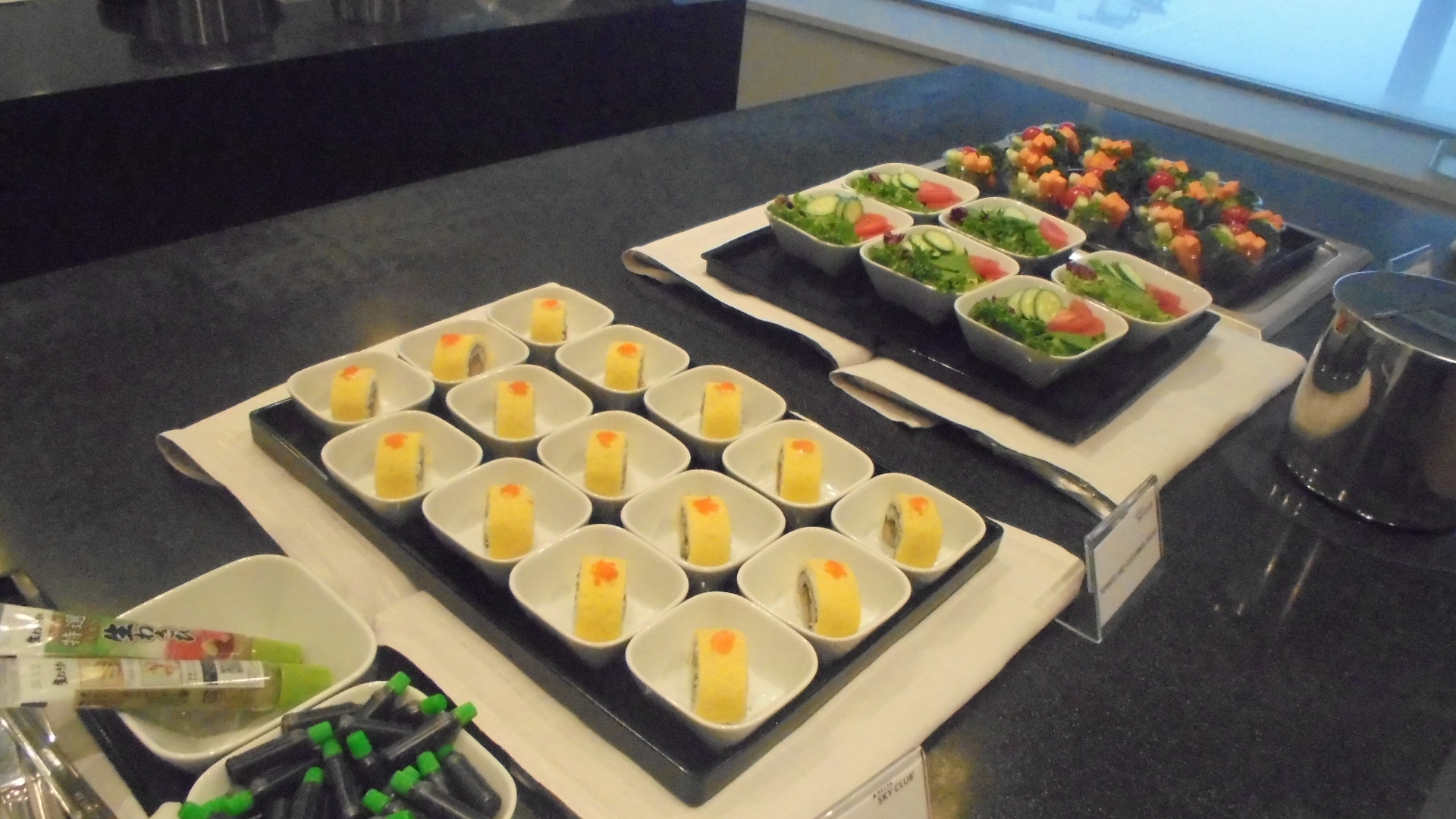
Refreshments served at the Delta Sky Club Lounge in the Narita International Airport

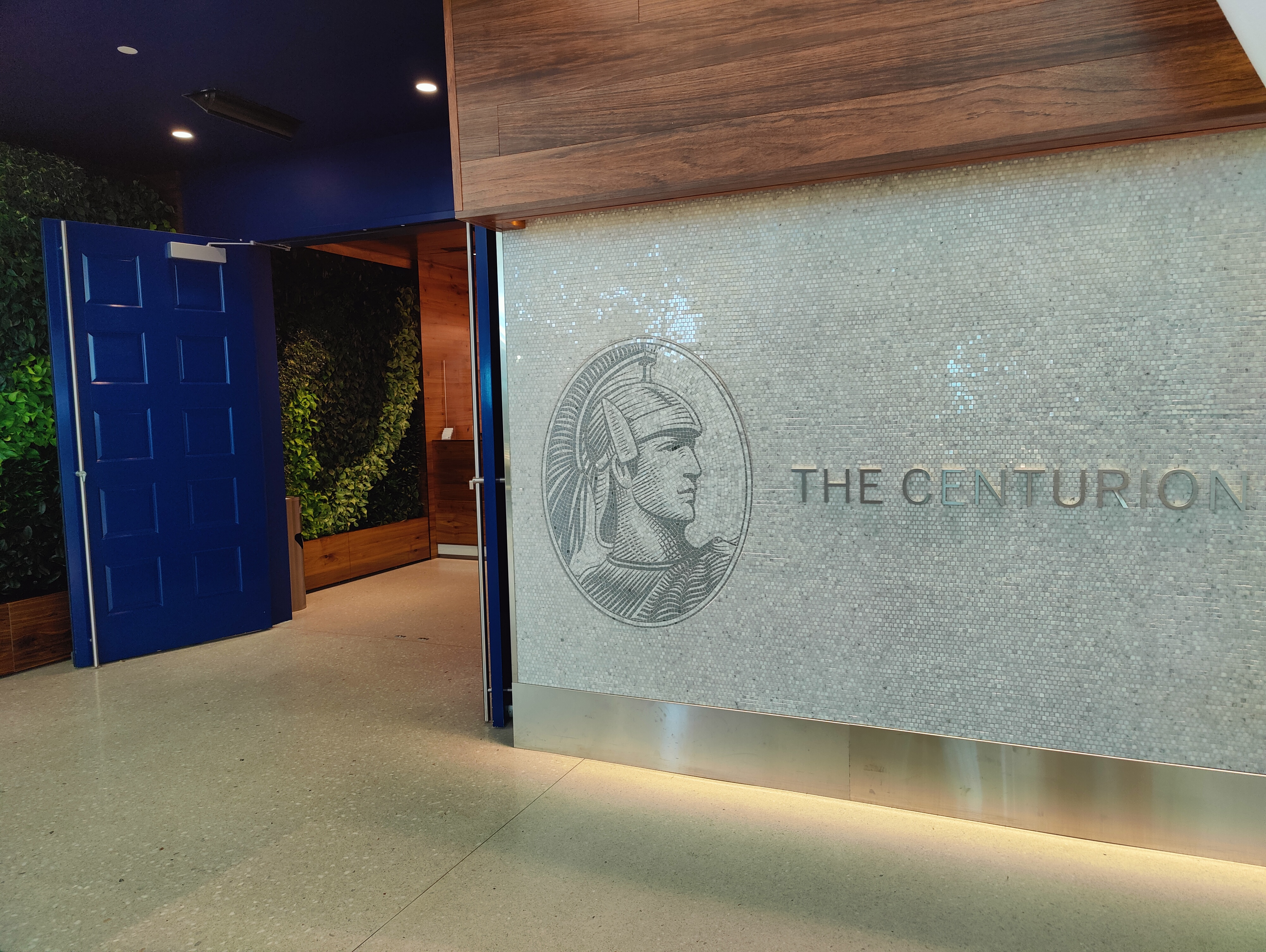
Entrance to American Express Centurion Lounge at JFK NYC airport (2022)
