= J.P. Morgan Reserve Card =

Invitation-only credit card

Latest design update of the J.P. Morgan Reserve Card

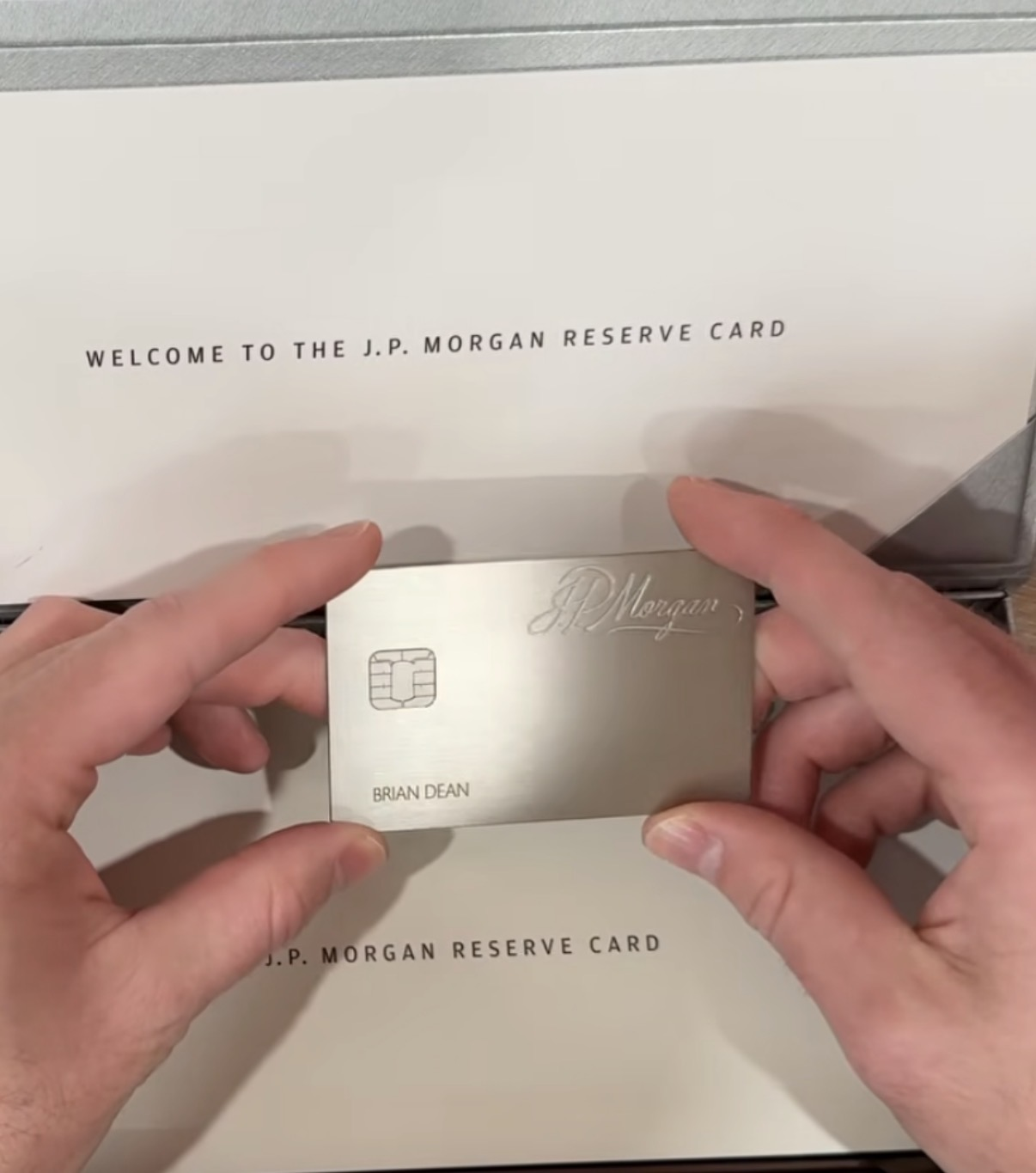
Updated J.P. Morgan Reserve Card from 2025

The J.P. Morgan Reserve Card, formerly branded and colloquially known as the Palladium Card, is a credit card issued by J.P. Morgan (Note: J.P. Morgan & Co. is a subsidiary of JPMorgan Chase specialized in commercial banking, investment banking, and private banking.) on the Visa network. It is reserved for the wealthiest clients of the firm's global private bank. The card is minted out of a brass alloy, laser-engraved, and plated with metal palladium and 23-karat gold. Eligibility for the card is not fully known as it is invitation-only and at the discretion of J.P. Morgan. The card does not report to credit bureaus or maintain a pre-set credit limit. It is considered a status symbol among the affluent.

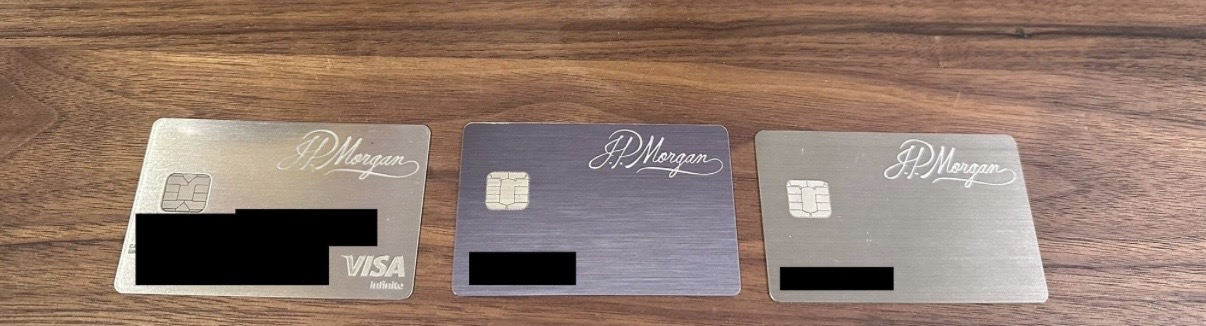
Evolution of the J.P. Morgan Reserve Card

== History ==
The card was launched in September 2009, following the 2008 financial crisis, for J.P. Morgan's high-net-worth individual clients. Its original name, the Palladium Card, reflected the card's composition: minted out of a brass alloy, laser-engraved, and plated with metal palladium. The card was re-branded as the J.P. Morgan Reserve Card in September 2016. Bloomberg described the Palladium Card as the "card for the 1% of the 1%". Clients of J.P. Morgan who are invited to carry the card must have a reported minimum of US$10 million in assets under management (AUM) with the private bank. The firm declined to confirm this figure as part of their eligibility requirements.

== Physical specifications ==
The J.P. Morgan Reserve Card was one of the first U.S. credit cards to adopt EMV smart chip technology. With its brass construction and palladium plating, the card weighs 1 ounce or 28.35 grams, five times the weight of a conventional plastic credit card and twice the weight of the titanium constructed American Express Centurion Card.

== Features ==
Region	Annual fee	Initiation fee	Credit limit	Eligibility
United States	US$795	None	Unlimited	$10 million AUM at J.P. Morgan (reported)
United Kingdom	£500	None	Unlimited	$10 million AUM at J.P. Morgan (reported)
European Union	€555	None	Unlimited	$10 million AUM at J.P. Morgan (reported)
China	¥4,000	None	Unlimited	$10 million AUM at J.P. Morgan (reported)

== See also ==
- American Express, Centurion Card, and Platinum Card
