= Edward Corwin =

Edward Corwin may refer to:

- Edward Henry Lewinski Corwin (1885–1953), American author of historical books
- Edward Samuel Corwin (1878–1963), American law professor
- Edward Tanjore Corwin (1834–1914), American clergyman and historian of the Reformed Church in America

== See also ==
- Corwin (disambiguation)
