= Gun laws in Arizona =

Location of Arizona in the United States

Firearm laws in Arizona regulate the sale, possession, and use of firearms and ammunition in the state of Arizona in the United States.

== Summary table ==
Subject / law	Long guns	Handguns	Relevant statutes	Notes
State permit required to purchase?	No	No		
Firearm registration?	No	No	A.R.S. § 13-3108	
Assault weapon law?	No	No		
Magazine capacity restriction?	No	No		
Owner license required?	No	No		
Permit required for concealed carry?	N/A	No	A.R.S. § 13-3102; A.R.S. § 13-3112	Arizona is a "shall issue" state for citizens and lawful permanent residents who are 21 years or older. Permitless carry took effect on July 29, 2010.
Permit required for open carry?	No	No		May carry openly without permit.
Castle Doctrine/Stand Your Ground law?	Yes	Yes	A.R.S. §§ 13-401 to 13-421	
State preemption of local restrictions?	Yes	Yes	A.R.S. § 13-3108	
NFA weapons restricted?	No	No		
Shall certify?	Yes	Yes	A.R.S. § 13-3121	Shall certify within 60 days.
Peaceable Journey laws?	No	No		
Background checks required for private sales?	No	No	A.R.S. § 44-1382	

== Firearms carry ==
=== Open carry ===
On foot, any adult person who is not a "prohibited possessor" may openly carry a loaded firearm visible to others without a permit. Generally, a person must be at least 18 years of age to possess or openly carry a firearm. However, this does not apply to:

1. Juveniles within a private residence.
2. Emancipated juveniles.
3. Juveniles accompanied by a parent, grandparent or guardian, or a certified hunter safety instructor or certified firearms safety instructor acting with the consent of the juvenile's parent or guardian.
4. Juveniles on private property owned or leased by the juvenile or the juvenile's parent, grandparent, or guardian.
5. Juveniles fourteen years of age and up engaged in any of the following activities:

- Lawful hunting or shooting events or marksmanship practice at established ranges or other areas where the discharge of a firearm is not prohibited.
- Lawful transportation of an unloaded firearm for lawful hunting.
- Lawful transportation of an unloaded firearm between the hours of 5:00 a.m. and 10:00 p.m. for shooting events or marksmanship practice at established ranges or other areas where the discharge of a firearm is not prohibited.
- Activities that require a firearm related to the production of crops, livestock, poultry, livestock products, poultry products, or ratites or in the production or storage of agricultural commodities.

The law does not expressly require openly carried weapons to be in a holster, case or scabbard; however, the open carrying of weapons not in a holster, case or scabbard while on foot in a populated area could be construed as reckless display or, if others feel threatened by such, even assault with a deadly weapon.

In a vehicle, any adult person who is not a prohibited possessor may openly carry a loaded firearm in a vehicle whether in a holster, case, compartment, or in plain view. Persons under 21 may openly carry a loaded or unloaded firearm in a vehicle only if it is in plain view, i.e. discernible from the ordinary observation of a person located outside and within the immediate vicinity of the vehicle.

=== Concealed carry ===
In Arizona, anyone who is not prohibited from owning a firearm and is at least 21 years old can carry a concealed weapon without a permit as of July 29, 2010. Arizona was the third state in modern U.S. history (after Vermont and Alaska, followed by Wyoming) to allow the carrying of concealed weapons without a permit, and it is the first state with a large urban population to do so.

Arizona is classified as a "shall issue" state. Even though Arizona law allows concealed carry by adults without permit, concealed carry permits are still available and issued by the Concealed Weapons Permit Unit of the Arizona Department of Public Safety for purposes of reciprocity with other states or for carrying firearms in certain regulated places. Requirements for issuance include taking a training class (provided by a licensed third party) or hunter education class, submitting a finger print card, and paying a $60 fee. Applicants must be at least 21 years of age. New permits are valid for five years. Renewing a permit requires an application and criminal background check. Arizona recognizes all valid out-of-state carry permits.

== State preemption ==
The Arizona legislature has largely preempted political subdivisions (counties, cities) prohibiting them from making what laws that they want. Political subdivisions may regulate the carrying of weapons by juveniles or by their own employees or contractors when such employees or contractors are acting within the course and scope of their employment or contract. They may also bar the carrying of weapons at public establishments and events by those who do not have concealed carry permits. Public establishments and events where carry by non-permit holders is prohibited must provide secure storage for weapons on-site, which must be readily accessible upon entry and allow for immediate retrieval upon exit.

== Tribal law ==
Native American reservations, which comprise over a quarter of the land area of the state, may have gun laws identical to or more restrictive than state law. Some tribal governments in Arizona may not recognize Arizona law on the concealed carrying of firearms without a permit while on tribal land.

All Arizona tribes recognize federal law, including the "safe passage" provision of the federal Firearm Owners Protection Act Act (FOPA). FOPA provides that, notwithstanding any state, tribal, or local law, and while making a continuous journey, a person who is not a prohibited possessor is entitled to transport a firearm or ammunition for any lawful purpose from any place where he may lawfully possess and carry such firearm to any other place where he may lawfully possess and carry such firearm or ammunition if, during such transportation the firearm is unloaded, and neither the firearm nor any ammunition being transported is readily accessible or is directly accessible from the passenger compartment of such transporting vehicle. In vehicles without a trunk, the unloaded firearm or ammunition must be in a locked container other than the glove compartment or console. Recent U.S. Court of Appellate rulings have confirmed that FOPA`s protections only apply to unloaded firearms not readily accessible to the traveler, and many tribal governments have strict laws with respect to firearms being carried or transported on tribal lands. For example, in the event of a vehicle stop, Navajo Nation police will seize any loaded firearm found to be accessible to the driver or passenger. and confiscated firearms are not returnable unless the owner can establish proof of ownership of the firearm and ammunition by presenting a bill of sale or other evidence at the police station at a later date.

== Discharging a firearm ==
It is generally illegal to discharge a firearm within or into the limits of any municipality. However, this prohibition does not apply to persons discharging firearms in the following circumstances:

- On a properly supervised range.
- In an area recommended as a hunting area by the Arizona Game and Fish Department, approved and posted as required by the chief of police. (Any such area may be closed when deemed unsafe by the chief of police or the director of the Arizona Game and Fish Department).
- For the control of nuisance wildlife by permit from the Arizona Game and Fish Department or the United States Fish and Wildlife Service.
- By special permit of the chief of police of the municipality.
- As required by an animal control officer in the performance of duties.
- Firing blank cartridges.
- More than a 1/4 mile from any occupied structure as defined in section ARS 13-3101.
- In self-defense, or defense of another person against an animal attack if a reasonable person would believe deadly physical force against the animal is immediately necessary and reasonable under the circumstances to protect a person from harm.
- In self-defense or, in defense of another person against a criminal attack as permitted by the laws regarding defensive use of force.

Under Shannon's Law, unlawful discharge of a firearm within a municipality is a class 6 felony, with a presumptive 1 year imprisonment.

According to the Arizona Gun Owners Guide by Alan Korwin, while discharging a firearm using blanks within the limits of a municipality is not expressly prohibited by law, disturbing the peace (ARS 13-2904) or other charges could still apply.

== Prohibited areas ==
State law prohibits the carrying of firearms in certain areas. These prohibited areas include:

- Hydroelectric or nuclear power generating stations. However, this does not apply to:

- A peace officer or any person summoned by any peace officer to assist and while actually assisting in the performance of official duties.
- A member of the military forces of the United States or of any state of the United States in the performance of official duties.
- A warden, deputy warden, community correctional officer, detention officer, special investigator or correctional officer of the state department of corrections or the department of juvenile corrections.
- A person specifically licensed, authorized or permitted pursuant to an Arizona or federal statute.

- Polling places on election day. However, this does not apply to:

- A peace officer or any person summoned by any peace officer to assist and while actually assisting in the performance of official duties.
- A member of the military forces of the United States or of any state of the United States in the performance of official duties.
- A warden, deputy warden, community correctional officer, detention officer, special investigator or correctional officer of the state department of corrections or the department of juvenile corrections.
- A person specifically licensed, authorized or permitted pursuant to an Arizona or federal statute.

- Secured areas of airports. However, this does not apply to:

- General aviation areas not included in the security identification display area or sterile area as defined in the airport security program approved by the Transportation Security Administration.
- The lawful transportation of deadly weapons in accordance with state and federal law.
- A peace officer or a federally sworn officer while in the actual performance of the officer's duties.
- A member of the military forces of the United States or of any state of the United States in the actual performance of the member's official duties.
- An individual who is authorized by a federal agency in the actual performance of the individual's official duties.

- Inside a jail or on the grounds thereof.
- K-12 School grounds. However, this does not apply to:

- Firearms possessed for the purposes of preparing for, conducting or participating in hunter or firearm safety courses.
- Firearms for use on the school grounds in a program approved by the school.
- Unloaded firearms carried inside a means of transportation and under the control of an adult, provided that if the adult leaves the means of transportation, it is locked and the firearms are not visible from the outside.
- A peace officer or any person summoned by any peace officer to assist and while actually assisting in the performance of official duties.
- A member of the military forces of the United States or of any state of the United States in the performance of official duties.
- A warden, deputy warden, community correctional officer, detention officer, special investigator or correctional officer of the state department of corrections or the department of juvenile corrections.
- A person specifically licensed, authorized or permitted pursuant to an Arizona or federal statute.

- Establishments which are licensed to sell alcohol for consumption on the premises. However, this does not apply to:

- The licensee or an employee of the licensee acting with the permission of the licensee to be in possession of a firearm while on the licensed premises.
- A person who is on the premises for a limited time to seek emergency aid, if such person does not buy, receive, consume, or possess alcohol while there.
- Hotel or motel guest room accommodations.
- The exhibition or display of a firearm in conjunction with a meeting, show, class or similar event.
- A person with a concealed carry permit who carries a concealed handgun, provided that there is no properly notice posted forbidding such pursuant to A.R.S. 4-229, and provided that the concealed carry permit holder consumes no alcohol while on the premises.
- Peace officers or members of a sheriff's volunteer posse while on duty who have received firearms training that is approved by the Arizona Peace Officer Standards and Training board.

- Any private property or private establishment where the owner or any other person having lawful control over the property has given reasonable notice forbidding the carrying of deadly weapons or firearms. However, this does not apply to:

- Officers of the law who are legally executing official duties
- Lawfully possessed firearms that are in a locked and privately owned vehicle or in a locked compartment on a privately owned motorcycle and that are not visible from outside the vehicle or motorcycle.

- Any public college or university where the carrying of deadly weapons or firearms has been prohibited by the governing board
- On the grounds of or in a secure care facility under the jurisdiction of the department of juvenile corrections
- In a correctional facility or the grounds of a correctional facility

In addition, political subdivisions have limited power to prohibit the carrying of firearms in certain areas as described above. Carrying a firearm at a jail, correctional facility, juvenile secure care facility, or in a hydroelectric or nuclear power generating station is a felony. Carrying a firearm in any other prohibited area, absent any other concomitant criminal conduct, is a misdemeanor. Carrying a firearm on private property or in a private establishment where it has been forbidden by the owner or another person having lawful control over the property is not expressly prohibited by law, but is held to constitute misdemeanor trespass. Carrying a firearm at a public college or university where it has been prohibited by the governing board is not expressly prohibited by law, but is held to violate provisions of ARS 13-2911, which prohibits "interference with or disruption of an educational institution". The restrictions pertaining to licensed liquor establishments do not apply to liquor stores or other stores that sell only closed containers of alcohol for consumption off the premises.

== Prohibited possessors ==
State law prohibits the possession of firearms and other deadly weapons by certain categories of "prohibited possessors". According to current statute, these categories are defined as follows:

- Anyone who has been found to constitute a danger to self or to others or to be persistently or acutely disabled or gravely disabled pursuant to court order under ARS 36-540, and whose right to possess a firearm has not been restored pursuant to ARS 13-925.
- Anyone convicted of a felony, or who has been adjudicated delinquent for a felony, and whose State civil right to possess or carry a gun or firearm has not been restored by separate order of the court.
- Anyone who has been found incompetent to stand trial and who has not subsequently been found competent.
- Anyone who has been guilty except insane of committing a crime
- Anyone who is, at the time of possession, serving a term of imprisonment in any correctional or detention facility.
- Anyone who is, at the time of possession, serving a term of probation pursuant to a conviction for a domestic violence offense or a felony offense, parole, community supervision, work furlough, home arrest, or release on any other basis, or who is serving a term of probation or parole pursuant to an interstate compact.
- Anyone who is an undocumented alien or a nonimmigrant alien, traveling with or without documentation for business or pleasure, or who is studying in Arizona and maintains a foreign residence, except for:

- Nonimmigrant aliens who possess a valid hunting license or permit lawfully issued by a state in the United States.
- Nonimmigrant aliens who enter the United States to participate in a competitive target shooting event or to display firearms at a sports or hunting trade show sponsored by a national, state, or local firearms trade organization devoted to competitive or sporting use of firearms.
- Certain diplomats.
- Officials of foreign governments or distinguished foreign visitors who are designated by the United States Department of State.
- Persons who have received a waiver from the United States Attorney General.

Notably, the prohibition against owning a firearm by a person found to be a danger to himself or others or persistently or acutely disabled or gravely disabled continues in effect even after the expiration of the mental health court order itself (365 days). Instead, a person whose right to possess a firearm was forfeited as part of a mental health order must have that right judicially restored by filing a petition with the court requesting a hearing and a court order restoring the right to possess a firearm.

Arizona appellate courts have ruled that ARS 1-244 bars the retroactive application of changes to the prohibited possessor statute unless there is an express legislative declaration of retroactive intent. Although the statute has been amended numerous times during its history, no such retroactive declarations have ever been passed into law. Thus, the possession of deadly weapons by some individuals may be governed by older versions of the statute which are either more or less restrictive than the one currently in force. For example, persons found to constitute a danger to self or others or to be persistently or acutely disabled or gravely disabled prior to September 30, 2009 do not need to petition the courts for a restoration of rights, as statutes in effect prior to that date either did not prohibit their possession of deadly weapons or prohibited such possession only temporarily, during their term of court-ordered treatment.

== Prohibited weapons ==
State law prohibits the possession of certain types of firearms and other deadly weapons by any citizen. These weapons are defined as follows:

- An item that is a bomb, grenade, rocket having a propellant charge of more than four ounces is an explosive, incendiary or poison gas, or any combination of parts or materials that is designed and intended for use in making such or converting a device into such, unless it has been classified as a "curio or relic" under federal law, or is registered under the federal National Firearms Act.
- A device that is designed, made or adapted to muffle the report of a firearm, unless it has been classified as a "curio or relic" under federal law, or is registered under the federal National Firearms Act.
- A firearm that is capable of shooting more than one shot automatically, without manual reloading, by a single function of the trigger, unless it has been classified as a "curio or relic" under federal law, or is registered under the federal National Firearms Act.
- A rifle with a barrel length of less than sixteen inches, or a shotgun with a barrel length of less than eighteen inches, or any firearm that is made from a rifle or shotgun and that, as modified, has an overall length of less than twenty-six inches, unless it has been classified as a "curio or relic" under federal law, or is registered under the federal National Firearms Act.
- A breakable container that contains a flammable liquid with a flash point of one hundred fifty degrees Fahrenheit or less and that has a wick or similar device capable of being ignited, or any combination of parts or materials that is designed and intended for use in making such or converting a device into such.
- A chemical or combination of chemicals, compounds or materials, including dry ice, that is possessed or manufactured for the purpose of generating a gas to cause a mechanical failure, rupture or bursting or an explosion or detonation of the chemical or combination of chemicals, compounds or materials.
- An improvised explosive device, or any combination of parts or materials that is designed and intended for use in making such or converting a device into such.

== Regarding police contact ==
- If a law enforcement officer contacts a person who is in possession of a firearm, the officer may take temporary custody of the firearm for the duration of that contact.
