= Corwin (surname) =

Corwin is a surname. Notable people with the surname include:

- Al Corwin (1926–2003), American baseball pitcher
- Amber Corwin (born 1978), American figure skater
- Betty Corwin (1920–2019), American theater archivist
- Charlie Corwin, American TV and film producer
- Daniel Lee Corwin (1958–1998), American serial killer
- Edward Henry Lewinski Corwin (1885–1953), American author of historical books
- Edward Samuel Corwin (1878–1963), American law professor
- Edward Tanjore Corwin (1834–1914), American writer and historian of the Reformed Dutch church
- Franklin Corwin (1818–1879), American politician from Illinois
- George Corwin (1666–1696), High Sheriff during the Salem witch trials
- Henri Max Corwin (1903–1962), Dutch businessman, philatelist and humanitarian who protected Jews during World War II
- Jane Corwin (born 1964), American politician
- Jeff Corwin (born 1967), television show host, Animal Planet
- John A. Corwin (1818–1863), American politician and judge from Ohio
- Jonathan Corwin (1640–1718), New England merchant, politician and one of the judges in the Salem witch trials
- Matthias Corwin (1761–1829), American politician
- Morena Corwin (born 1969), Playboy playmate
- Moses Bledso Corwin (1790–1872), American politician from Ohio
- Norman Corwin (1910–2011), American writer and producer
- Thomas Corwin (1794–1865), American politician from Ohio
