= Korwin =

Korwin may refer to:

- KORWiN, the previous name of a political party in Poland, now named New Hope
- Korwin, Greater Poland Voivodeship
- Korwin coat of arms
- Korwin-Szymanowski family
- Janusz Korwin-Mikke, Polish politician, writer and the founder of the Liberty party
- Alan Korwin, American writer, author and civil- and political-rights activist

== See also ==
- Corwin (disambiguation)
