= Shannon's law =

Shannon's law may refer to:

- Shannon's source coding theorem, which establishes the theoretical limits to lossless data compression
- Shannon–Hartley theorem, which establishes the theoretical maximum rate at which data can be reliably transmitted over a noisy channel
- Shannon's law (Arizona), a law against the firing of gunshots into the air, established after 14-year-old Shannon Smith was killed by a stray bullet in 1999
