= Curwen =

Curwen is an English surname. Notable people with the surname include:

- Dame Anne Curwen (1889–1973), National General Secretary, YWCA of Great Britain
- Annie Jessy Curwen (1845–1932), an author of books of instruction in music and piano playing
- Sir Christopher Curwen (1929–2013), Head of the British Secret Intelligence Service from 1985 to 1989
- Christopher Curwen (MP) (died 1450), English soldier, administrator and politician
- Clarice Modeste-Curwen, a politician and educator from Grenada
- Daisy Curwen (1889–1982), British swimmer
- David Curwen (1913–2011), British miniature railway steam locomotive mechanical engineer
- Henry Curwen (c.1581–1623), English politician
- Hugh Curwen (died 1568), English ecclesiastic and statesman
- John Curwen (1816–1880), English Congregationalist minister, and founder of the Tonic sol-fa system of music education
  - Curwen Press, a music publishing house founded 1863 by John Curwen
- John Curwen (physician) (1821–1901), Superintendent of the first public mental hospital in Pennsylvania
- Patric Curwen (1884–1949), British stage and film actor
- Patricius Curwen (c. 1602 – 1664), English landowner and politician
- Thomas Curwen, (1415–1486/1487), 15th-century sheriff of Cumberland, England
- Wilfred Curwen (1883–1915), English cricketer and soldier

== See also ==
- Corwin (disambiguation)
- Curwin
