= Curwin =

Curwin is a surname and given name. Notable people with the name include:

== Surname ==
- Julie Curwin (active 21st century), Canadian psychiatrist and writer
- Richard Curwin (1944–2018), American university lecturer

== Given name ==
- Curwin Bosch (born 1997), South African rugby union player
- Curwin Friesen (born 20th century), Canadian company president

== See also ==
- Curwen (surname)
