= Corwin =

Corwin may refer to:

== People ==
- Corwin (surname)
- Corwin (given name)

== Places in the United States ==
- Corwin Township, Logan County, Illinois
- Corwin, Tippecanoe County, Indiana, an extinct town
- Corwin, Kansas
- Corwin, New York, a hamlet in the town of Newfane
- Corwin, Ohio, a village
- Corwin, Wisconsin, a ghost town
- Salem Township, Warren County, Ohio, previously named Corwin Township
- Cape Corwin, Alaska
- Corwin Formation, geological formation in Alaska

== Entertainment ==
- Corwin (film), a 1996 documentary
- Corwin (TV series), a Canadian television series (1969-1971)

== Other uses ==
- USS Corwin, two ships
- Corwin Manufacturing Company, an early American automobile company
- Corwin Press, an imprint of SAGE Publishing

== See also ==
- Curwen, a surname
- Korwin (disambiguation)
