= Stray bullet =

Bullet hitting an unintended target

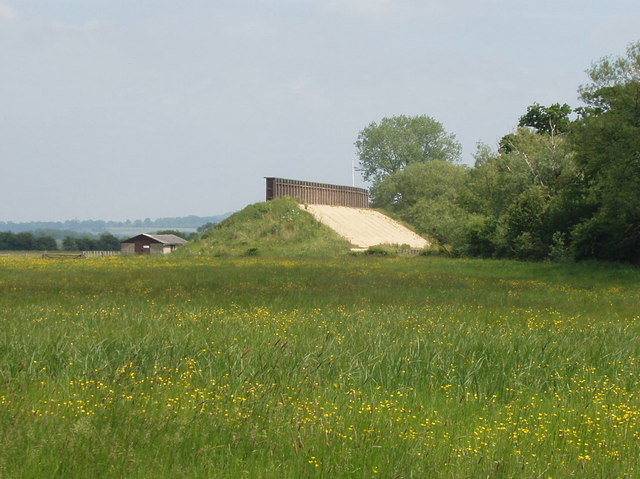
Rifle range butts on Otmoor. A butt is a pile of earth to stop stray bullets, behind the targets on a firing range.

A stray bullet is a bullet that, after being fired from a gun, hits an unintended target. Such a shooting accident may occur due to missing a target when hunting or sport-shooting or celebrating weddings, as a result of accidental/negligent discharges, or during crossfire or celebratory gunfire.

In the Philippines, incidents involving stray bullets (Filipino: Ligaw na Bala) rose during the New Year revelry. The Philippine National Police reportedly recorded 52 stray bullet incidents during between December 16, 2015 and January 5, 2016, in which 42 victims were injured. In Latin America, a UN report found 741 cases between 2014 and 2015, with the three leading countries being Brazil (197 cases), Mexico (116 cases) and Colombia (101 cases).

== See also ==
- Friendly fire
- Gunshot
- Glossary of firearms terms
