= Kenneth Crews =

American librarian

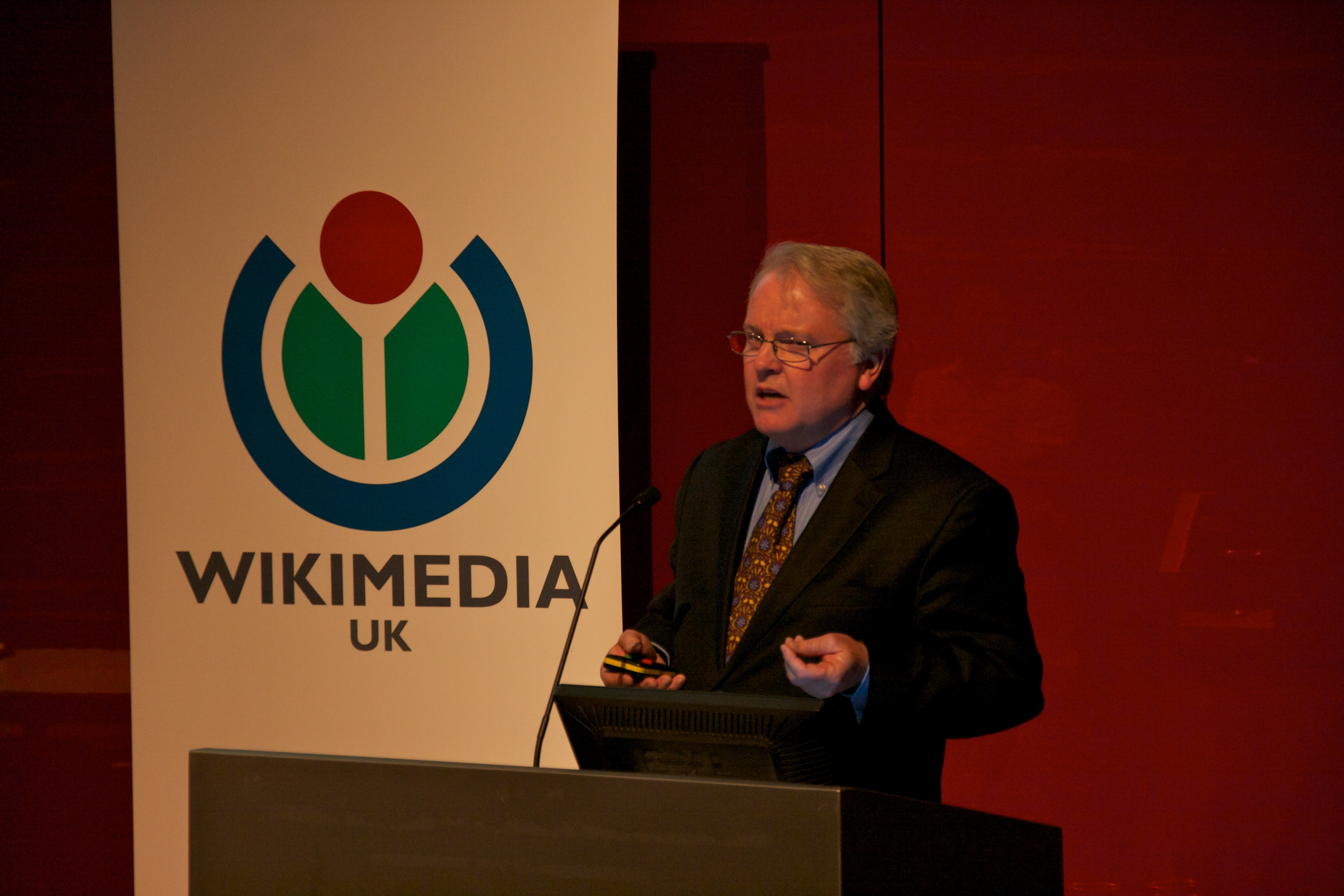
- Born: 1955
- Alma mater: Northwestern University; University of California, Los Angeles; Washington University in St. Louis
- Occupation: Lawyer

Kenneth D. Crews is an American copyright scholar and librarian. He is particularly noted for his scholarship around educational and library exceptions in copyright law, and was commissioned by WIPO to write an examination of those exceptions around the world. He is a frequent speaker and consultant on library-related copyright matters, and was called for expert testimony in the Cambridge University Press v. Becker copyright case challenging the practice of Georgia State University's e-reserves system. Crews is noted for pioneering the concept of the "fair use checklist", which has enjoyed widespread use in libraries and academic computing departments.

Crews earned a bachelor's degree from Northwestern University in history, a J.D. degree from Washington University School of Law, and M.L.S. and Ph.D. degrees in library science from UCLA. His dissertation won awards from both the Association of College and Research Libraries and the Association for the Study of Higher Education.

From 1980 to 1990, Crews practiced business and corporate law in Los Angeles. His first academic appointment, in 1990, was as associate professor of Business Law at San Jose State University. Beginning in 1994, Crews joined the faculty of law and of library & information science at IUPUI, where he established the first university-based copyright office. In 2003, Crews also joined the faculty of the Munich Intellectual Property Law Center. In 2008, Crews joined Columbia University as the director of the "Copyright Advisory Office" and an adjunct faculty member at the Columbia University law school.

In February 2014 Crews stepped down as director of Columbia's Copyright Advisory Office, and joined a private law firm in Los Angeles, while maintaining ties to the university, and continuing as a faculty member in the Munich program. Dr. Crews has given professional talks on copyright policy in forty-four US states and more than thirty countries of the world.

Earlier in his career, Crews's scholarship focussed on constitutional law and legal history. He is the author of two books on Edward Samuel Corwin, a leading constitutional scholar during the twentieth century.

== Notable works ==
- Copyright, Fair Use, and the Challenge for Universities: Promoting the Progress of Higher Education (The University of Chicago Press, 1993).
- Study on Copyright Limitations and Exceptions for Libraries and Archives, WIPO (2008), which contains a 70-page analysis of the exceptions.
- Study on Copyright Limitations and Exceptions for Libraries and Archives, WIPO (2015), which analyses the statutes of all 188 WIPO countries.
- Copyright Law for Librarians and Educators (1st edition 2000; 3rd edition, 2012).

== Awards ==
- L. Ray Patterson Copyright Award, American Library Association (2005) (first recipient)
- Mark T. Banner Award, American Bar Association, Section of Intellectual Property Law (2014)
