= Celebratory gunfire =

Shooting of a firearm into the air in celebration

Celebratory gunfire is the shooting of a firearm into the air in celebration. Notable incidents have occurred worldwide, even in countries where the practice is illegal.

Common occasions for celebratory gunfire include New Year's Day and religious holidays. The practice sometimes results in random death and injury from stray bullets. Property damage is another result of celebratory gunfire; shattered windows and damaged roofs are sometimes found after such celebrations.

== Injuries ==
Depending on the angle at which it is fired, the speed of a falling bullet changes. A bullet fired nearly vertically will lose the most speed, usually falling at terminal velocity, which is much lower than its muzzle velocity. Despite this, people can still be injured or killed by bullets falling at this speed. If a bullet is fired at other angles, it maintains its angular ballistic trajectory and is far less likely to engage in tumbling motion; it therefore travels at speeds much higher than a bullet in free fall. Dense, large bullets achieve higher terminal velocities than less dense, smaller bullets because of the different ratio of weight to cross section.

Between 1918 and 1920, United States Army Ordnance Corps' Julian Hatcher conducted experiments to determine the velocity of falling bullets, and calculated that .30 caliber rounds reach terminal velocities of 90 m/s (300 feet per second or 186 miles per hour). According to computer models, 9 mm handgun rounds reach terminal velocities of between 45 and 75 m/s (150 and 250 feet per second or 100 and 170 miles per hour). A bullet traveling at only 61 m/s (200 feet per second or 135 miles per hour) to 100 m/s (330 feet per second or 225 miles per hour) can penetrate human skin.

Any gunfire can damage the hearing of those nearby without ear protection, and blank rounds fired in an unsafe direction can cause injuries or death from muzzle blast at close range, as in the case of actor Jon-Erik Hexum. Birdshot fired from a shotgun disperses and loses energy much faster than slugs, buckshot, or bullets fired from rifles and pistols. Although potentially lethal for many yards at a low angle, when fired at a high angle, the main risk of injury from falling "shot rain" is the shot landing in the eyes and causing scratches, particularly to persons looking upwards without eye protection.

A Morbidity and Mortality Weekly Report by the U.S. Centers for Disease Control and Prevention (CDC) found that 80% of celebratory gunfire-related injuries in Puerto Rico, on New Year's Eve 2003 were to the head, feet, and shoulders. In Puerto Rico, about seven people have died from celebratory gunfire on New Year's Eve in the last 20 years. The last one was in 2012. Between the years 1985 and 1992, doctors at the King/Drew Medical Center in Los Angeles, California, treated some 118 people for random falling-bullet injuries. Thirty-eight of them died.

In 2005, the International Action Network on Small Arms (IANSA) ran education campaigns on the dangers of celebratory gunfire in Serbia and Montenegro. In Serbia, the campaign slogan was "every bullet that is fired up must come down."

== Trends ==
- Philippine Health Secretary Francisco Duque III noted the drop in stray bullet injuries, in that country, during the 2005 year-end holiday period – from 33 cases to 19.
- The number of complaints regarding random shooting in Dallas, Texas, on New Year's Eve, declined from approximately 1,000 in 1999 to 800 each in 2001 and 2002.
- In early 2008, increased partisanship in Lebanon led to the practice of firing celebratory gunfire in support of politicians appearing on local television, leading to multiple deaths and to calls from these leaders to end the practice.
- In Jordan, in the years 2017 and 2018, 3 deaths and 48 injuries caused by celebratory gunfire during festivities were reported, an increase in the number of incidents was noted between 2017 with 1786 incidents to 1845 incidents in 2018, despite such incidents being punishable by imprisonment.

== Notable incidents ==
=== Europe ===
- On January 7, 2008, at about 9:30 PM, a Montenegro Airlines Fokker 100 (4O-AOK) was shot at while landing at Podgorica Airport. A routine inspection of the aircraft led to the discovery of a bullet hole in the aircraft's tail. The aircraft was carrying 20 passengers, but no one was injured. The reason for the incident is unknown; however, reports indicate that it may have been an inadvertent result of guns being fired during celebrations for Orthodox Christmas.
- January 1, 2005: A stray bullet hit a young girl during New Year celebrations in the central square of downtown Skopje, North Macedonia. She died two days later. This incident led to the 2006 IANSA awareness campaign.
- October 12, 2003: Wedding guests in Belgrade, Serbia mistakenly shot down a small aircraft.

=== Middle East ===
- December 12, 2024: At least six Syrian civilians were reported to be killed as a result of celebratory gunfire following the fall of the Assad regime.
- September 4, 2021: At least 17 were killed and 41 were injured in Kabul, Afghanistan, by Taliban militants celebrating their takeover of the Panjshir Valley during the 2021 Taliban offensive.
- January 2, 2021: Several parked Middle East Airlines Airbus A320neo airliners at Rafic Hariri International Airport were damaged by falling bullets from celebratory gunfire in Beirut, Lebanon, with an additional death reported in the form of a Syrian refugee who was shot in the head by a stray bullet.
- April 6, 2014: A 20-year-old pregnant mother of two, Wadia Baidawi, was struck in the head and killed by a stray bullet from her neighbor's wedding in Sidon, Lebanon.
- November 21, 2012: Following a cease-fire ending fighting with Israel, celebratory gunfire in the Gaza Strip killed a man and wounded three others.
- October 30, 2012: Twenty-three people were electrocuted after celebratory gunfire brought down a power cable during a wedding party in eastern Saudi Arabia.
- August 2010: Two people were killed and 13 were injured in Jordan, as part of the yearly celebration of the announcement of the result of Tawjihi.
- July 29, 2007: At least four people were killed and 17 others wounded by celebratory gunfire in the capital city of Baghdad, Iraq, following the victory of the national football team in the AFC Asian Cup. Celebratory gunfire occurred despite warnings issued by Iraqi security forces and the country's leading Shiite cleric, Grand Ayatollah Ali al-Sistani, who forbade the gunfire with a religious fatwā.
- July 22, 2003: More than 20 people were killed in Iraq from celebratory gunfire following the deaths of Saddam Hussein's sons Uday and Qusay.
- May 17, 2000: Nine people were injured in Turkey by celebratory gunfire from Galatasaray fans after their victory in the 2000 UEFA Cup final.

=== South America ===
- December 25, 2012: A stray bullet believed to be related to Christmas celebrations killed a three-year-old girl in Asunción, Paraguay.

=== South Asia ===
- August 14, 2025: Three people were killed, including a child, and 109 others were injured, including three critically, in aerial firing accidents during Independence Day in Karachi, Pakistan. Authorities arrested 86 suspects and recovered 68 illegal weapons.
- November 16, 2016: A self-proclaimed godwoman and her private guards went on a celebratory shooting spree at a wedding in Karnal, in Haryana, India, killing the groom's aunt and leaving three of his relatives critically wounded.
- June 6, 2013: a 42-year-old Pakistani woman was killed by a stray bullet from celebratory gunfire. The gunfire was attributed to celebrations for the election of Pakistan's prime minister Nawaz Sharif. Her 19-year-old niece was also hit and rushed to the hospital in critical condition.
- February 25, 2007: Five people were killed by stray bullets fired at a kite festival in Lahore, Pakistan, including a six-year-old schoolboy who was struck in the head near his home in the city's Mazang area.
- December 1859: An autopsy showed that a native in India, who suddenly fell dead for no apparent reason, was mortally wounded from a bullet fired from a distance too far for the shot to be heard. The falling bullet had sufficient energy to pass through the victim's shoulder, a rib, a lung, his heart, and his diaphragm.

=== Southeast Asia ===
- On December 26, 1819, several Bugis people were on a gunfire spree to celebrate the wedding of their chief, Arung Belawa, happening in Tanjungpinang, Penyengat Island (present-day Indonesia). However, Dutch officials led by recently elected Resident G.E. Königsdorffer detained some of these men, which escalated to the murder of five men, including a chief named Raja Ronggik. Ronggik's death led to an all-out war between the Bugis and the Dutch in January 1820, with many Bugis civilians fleeing to Singapore in the ensuing aftermath.

=== United States ===
- December 31, 2025: 43-year-old Black American, Keith Porter Junior was shot by off-duty Immigration and Customs Enforcement agent Brian Palacios in Los Angeles, California. The family claims Porter was discharging celebratory gunfire for the New Year, while Department of Homeland Security officials claim that the immigration officer was responding to an "active shooter" situation, where Porter "fired three shots" at Palacios who "identified himself". LAPD has not corroborated claims of an "active shooter" and witnesses to the event do not corroborate identification or shots fired at Palacios. As of April 2026, no charges have been filed for Porter's death.
- December 31, 2023: 3-year-old Brayden Smith was with his family on New Year's Eve when a bullet passed through their Memphis, Tennessee apartment window, striking the toddler during what police believe was "celebratory gunfire." Smith was rushed to the hospital, but died around 6 AM Jan. 3.
- January 1, 2023: Two people, a 40-year-old man and a 35-year-old man, died after celebratory gunfire was discharged at a party in Lawrence Township, Michigan. A 62-year-old man was arrested at the scene.
- December 31, 2021, and January 1, 2022: Multiple people in Durham, North Carolina, were struck by celebratory bullets, including one woman who was killed. In Canton, Ohio a man firing celebratory bullets was shot and killed through his wooden fence by police.
- January 1, 2020: A patron who was eating dinner at The Big Catch restaurant in St. Petersburg, Florida, on New Year's Day was struck by a celebratory bullet.
- December 31, 2019: In Texas, a 61-year-old nurse named Philippa Ashford was shot and killed on New Year's Eve, likely by celebratory gunfire, according to police.
- January 1, 2017: Armando Martinez, a Texas state Representative, was wounded in the head by a stray bullet during a New Year's celebration.
- January 1, 2015: A 43-year-old man, Javier Suarez Rivera, was struck in his head and killed while watching fireworks with his family in Houston.
- July 4, 2013: A 7-year-old boy, Brendon Mackey, was struck in the top of his head and killed while walking with his father shortly before 9 PM amid a large crowd before the fireworks display over the Swift Creek Reservoir, outside Richmond, Virginia.
- January 1, 2013: A 10-year-old girl, Aaliyah Boyer, collapsed after being struck in the back of the head while watching the neighborhood fireworks in Elkton, Maryland. She died two days later of her injuries.
- July 4, 2012: A 34-year-old woman, Michelle Packard, was struck in the head and killed while watching the fireworks with her family. The police believe the shot could have come from a mile away.
- January 1, 2010: A four-year-old boy, Marquel Peters, was struck by a bullet and killed inside his church The Church of God of Prophecy in Decatur, Georgia. It is presumed the bullet may have penetrated the roof of the church around 12:20 AM.
- In March 2008, Chef Paul Prudhomme was grazed by a .22 caliber stray bullet while catering the Zurich Classic of New Orleans golf tournament. He at first thought a bee had stung his arm required no serious medical attention and, within five minutes, was back to cooking for the golf tournament. It was thought to have been a falling bullet.
- December 28, 2005: A 23-year-old U.S. Army private on leave after basic training fired a 9mm pistol into the air in celebration with friends, according to police, one of the bullets came through a fifth-floor apartment window in the New York City borough of Queens, striking a 28-year-old mother of two in the eye. She was found dead by her husband within minutes of the shooting. The shooter had been drinking the night before and turned himself in to the police the next morning when he heard the news. He was charged with second-degree manslaughter and weapons-related crimes, and was later found guilty and sentenced to 4 to 12 years in prison.
- June 14, 1999: Arizona, A 14-year-old girl, Shannon Smith, was struck on the top of her head by a bullet and killed while in the backyard of her home. This incident resulted in Arizona enacting "Shannon's Law" in 2000, that made the discharge of a firearm into the air illegal.
- January 1, 1999: Joseph Jaskolka of Wilmington was visiting family members in Philadelphia for New Year's when he was struck in the head by a stray bullet as he walked with family members on Fernon Street headed to festivities on South 2nd Street in South Philadelphia. The incident is believed to be from gunfire celebrating the New Year. The bullet remains lodged in Jaskolka's brainstem, and he was left paralyzed on the right side of his body due to his injury.
- December 31, 1994: Amy Silberman, a tourist from Boston, was killed by a falling bullet from celebratory firing while walking on the Riverwalk in the French Quarter of New Orleans, Louisiana. The Police Department there has been striving to educate the public on the danger since then, frequently making arrests for firing into the air.
- July 4, 1950: Bernard Doyle was killed in his seat while attending a New York Giants game at the Polo Grounds. The bullet was determined to have been fired by Robert Peebles, a juvenile, from an apartment building some distance away on Coogan's Bluff, presumably in celebration of Independence Day.

== Penalties ==
- In North Macedonia, a person found guilty of firing off a gun during celebrations faces a jail sentence of up to ten years.
- In Italy, under art.703 of the Penal Code (Dangerous ignitions and explosions), a person found guilty of firing a gun without permission in an inhabited place or nearby, is sentenced to a fine of up to €103; if they commit the act in a crowded place the sentence may go as high as up to a month in prison. The law also applies to fireworks, rockets, hot air balloons, and, in general, "dangerous ignitions and explosions".
- In Pakistan, section 144 of the Pakistan Penal Code is imposed to prevent aerial firing during celebrations if harm is caused, and an FIR may be registered against a person who does so. However, many cases of aerial firing go unreported.
- In the United States, crime classifications vary from a misdemeanor to a felony in different states:
  - In Arizona, firing a gun into the air was raised from a misdemeanor to a felony by Shannon's law, in response to the death of a 14-year-old from a stray bullet in 1999.
  - In California, discharging a firearm into the air is a felony punishable by three years in state prison. If the stray bullet kills someone, the shooter can be charged with murder.
  - In Minnesota, it is illegal to discharge a firearm over a cemetery, or at or in a public transit vehicle. Additionally, local governments may regulate the discharge of a weapon within their jurisdictions.
  - In Ohio, discharging a firearm or a deadly weapon in a public place is classified as disorderly conduct, a Class B misdemeanor, punishable by up to 180 days in jail and a fine of up to $2,000.
  - In Texas, random gunfire is a Class A misdemeanor, punishable by a maximum of one year in jail and a $4,000 fine. Anyone who injures or kills someone with a stray bullet could face more serious felony charges.
  - In Wisconsin, criminal charges for this type of offense range from "endangering safety by use of a dangerous weapon" to "reckless homicide" in the event of a death, with penalties ranging from nine months to 25 years in prison."

== Cultural references ==
The non-fiction U.S. cable television program MythBusters on the Discovery Channel covered this topic in Episode 50: "Bullets Fired Up" (original airdate: April 19, 2006). Special-effects experts Adam Savage and Jamie Hyneman conducted a series of experiments to answer the question: "Can celebratory gunfire kill when the bullets fall back to earth?"

Using pig carcasses, they worked out the terminal velocity of a falling bullet. They had a mixed result, answering the question with all three of the show's possible outcomes: Confirmed, Plausible and Busted. They tested falling bullets by firing them from both a handgun and a rifle, by firing them from an air gun designed to propel them at terminal velocity, and by dropping them in the desert from an instrumented balloon.

They found that while bullets traveling on a perfectly vertical trajectory tumble on the way down, creating turbulence that reduces terminal velocity below the level that would be lethal, it was very difficult to fire a bullet along this near-ideal vertical trajectory. In practice, bullets were likely to remain spin-stabilized on a ballistic trajectory and fall at a potentially lethal terminal velocity. They also verified cases of actual deaths from falling bullets.

== See also ==
- Stray bullet
- Warning shot
- Feu de joie
- 21-gun salute
