= Arizonans for Gun Safety =

Advocacy organization

- Founded: 1995; 31 years ago
- Founder: Geraldine Hills
- Type: 501(c)(3)
- Tax ID no.: 86-0981306
- Purpose: Gun safety, gun law
- Region served: Arizona
- Services: Policy related to gun violence prevention and responsible gun ownership Education >Advocacy
- Method: Advocacy; Community mobilization Outreach programs
- Key people: Maya Zuckerberg (President) Macey Chandler (Vice President)
- Website: azgunsafety.org

Arizonans for Gun Safety (AzGS) is a non-profit organization that aims to reduce gun-related deaths and promote gun safety. The organization also has education programs to teach about safe storage practices, non-violent conflict resolution, and ways to address youth violence.

== History ==
In 1994 the brother of Geraldine Hill was killed by a man with an AK-47 and a history of mental illness. One year later, Hills created AzGS.

Some other group members were similarly affected by gun violence. Jennifer Longdon joined and became a president of AzGS after she was paralyzed due to a random drive-by shooting. Otis and Lory Smith joined the board of directors in 2000 after their daughter Shannon was killed from a stray bullet fired into the air. The group was later instrumental in passing Shannon's Law, named after Otis and Lory's daughter.

The group endorsed the Assault Weapons Ban of 2013.

In 2014 AzGS filed an amicus curiae brief for the appellee in the case of Heller v. District of Columbia.

== March for our Lives ==
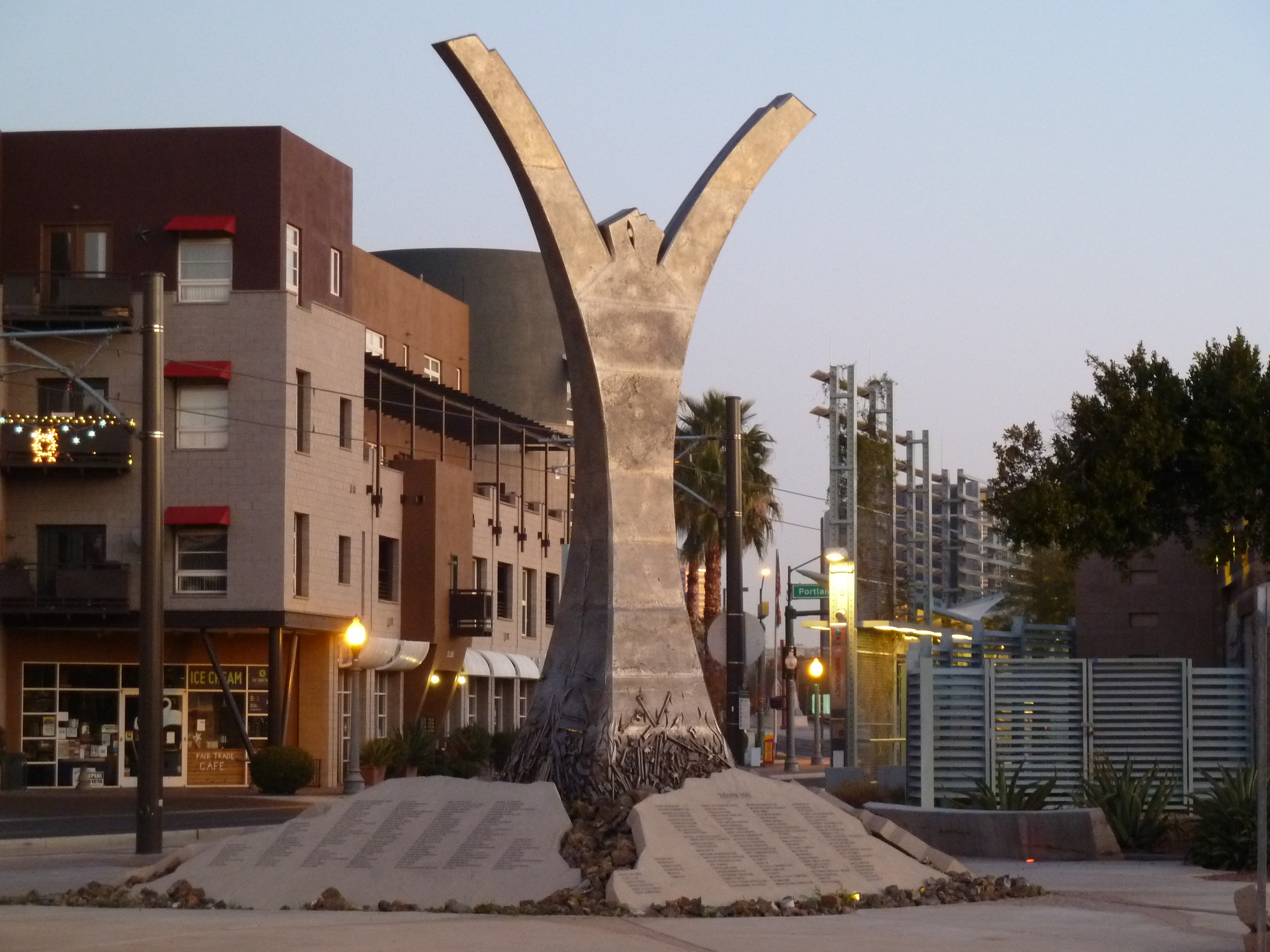
The "Release the Fear" Statue, made from 8,000 pounds of metal taken from weapons of violence in Arizona, was the site of the March for Our Lives Arizona protest.

AzGS was a fiscal sponsor of the 2018 March for Our Lives protests that took place in Arizona, with AzGS founder Geraldine Hills helping to manage more than $14,000 that March for Our Lives raised via GoFundMe merchandise sales. An estimated 15,000 people showed up at the capitol protest on March 24, 2018. High-schoolers, Arizona Congressman Ruben Gallego, and Geraldine Hills all took turns at the microphone.

At the September 2019 March for Our Lives protest near the "Release the Fear" statue, shoes and sandals of those affected by gun violence were placed at the base of the statue, including those of former U.S. Representative Gabby Giffords.

== Gun buyback program ==
AzGS used to facilitate gun buyback weekends, collecting thousands of guns in conjunction with the Phoenix Police Department. In 2013 Governor Jan Brewer signed HB 2455 into law, requiring city or county-sponsored programs to resell (instead of destroy) guns they obtain, rendering police buyback programs counterproductive.

Artist Robert Miley, creator of the Release the Fear, a monument constructed of melted-down weapons used in violent acts across Arizona, said this of the HB 2455: "I think we need to turn to our youth and realize the things we pass now, whatever they are, they're going to affect generations to come".
