= Departmentalism =

U.S. constitutional theory that all three branches are co-equal interpreters

Departmentalism, often expressed through coordinate construction or coordinate interpretation, holds that each branch of the federal government has authority to interpret the United States Constitution when exercising its own powers. Under this view, judicial decisions are binding in specific cases before the courts but do not necessarily control how the political branches (Congress and the President) interpret the Constitution in carrying out their ongoing functions. This contrasts with judicial supremacy, the view that the Supreme Court's constitutional interpretations are more generally binding on the other branches, as is often associated with Cooper v. Aaron (1958).

Departmentalism is often linked to unitary executive theory, as both invoke independent authority to interpret the Constitution.

== See also ==
- Edward Samuel Corwin
- Judicial review
- Separation of powers

== Bibliography ==
- Gardbaum, Stephen (2018). "What is judicial supremacy?". In Jacobsohn, Gary; Schor, Miguel (eds.). Comparative Constitutional Theory. Research Handbooks in Comparative Constitutional Law (1 ed.). Cheltenham: Edward Elgar Publishing. pp. 21–44. doi:10.4337/9781784719135. ISBN 978-1-78471-913-5.
- Gerhardt, Michael J. (2010). "Constitutional Construction and Departmentalism: A Case Study of the Demise of the Whig Presidency". University of Pennsylvania Journal of Constitutional Law. 12 (2): 425–459. ISSN 1521-9143.
