= Robert J. Kerner =

American historian and professor (1887 – 1956)

- Born: August 26, 1887; Chicago, Illinois, United States
- Died: November 29, 1956 (aged 69); Berkeley, California, United States

Academic background
- Education: University of Chicago (AB, AM); Harvard University (PhD)
- Thesis: Bohemia under Leopold II, 1790-92 (1914)
- Doctoral advisor: Archibald Cary Coolidge

Academic work
- Discipline: History
- Sub-discipline: Slavic studies
- Institutions: University of Missouri; University of California, Berkeley

Robert Joseph Kerner (August 26, 1887 – November 29, 1956) was an American academic of eastern European history. Educated at the University of Chicago and Harvard University, Kerner was a professor at the University of Missouri from 1914 to 1926, serving as the dean of its graduate school before departing to lecture at the University of California, Berkeley, where he was a professor of history from 1928 until his death in 1956.

== Biography ==
Kerner was born on August 26, 1887, in Chicago to Joseph A. Kerner, a founder of the Czech-language Denni Hlasatel newspaper, and Rose Kerner (née Veselak). He received his Bachelor of Arts and Master of Arts from the University of Chicago in 1908 and 1909, respectively; he served as an assistant instructor at the University of Illinois during his time studying there. Kerner began his doctoral studies at Harvard University in 1910, serving during his first two years as an assistant of history at Harvard and Radcliffe College. Kerner studied under Archibald Cary Coolidge, and obtained his doctorate in 1914.

Kerner began his academic career as an instructor at the University of Missouri in 1914; he served as an assistant professor at the university between 1916 and 1918, and as associate professor between 1918 and 1921. He served as an expert for the American Commission to Negotiate Peace (under Archibald Cary Coolidge) in 1918 and 1919, participating in negotiations that would eventually lead to the formation of Czechoslovakia. Around the same time, he published Slavic Europe, a bibliography of western European languages "that has not been superseded", according to an obituary written by professors at the University of California some decades later. He served as the editor of the Journal of International Relations between 1919 and 1922.

Between June 1925 and September 1926, Kerner served as acting dean of the University of Missouri's graduate school. During his tenure, the graduate school adopted a standardized policy that all students were to follow, which led to a "well-organized Graduate School" being included among the university's divisions for the first time. He departed from the University of Missouri in 1926, and in 1928 he accepted a professorship in modern European history at the University of California, Berkeley. He served as the editor of the Journal of Modern History between 1929 and 1931. In February 1931, he formed the Northeastern Asia Seminar, a five-year colloquium intended to study the factors behind the relations between China, Russia, and Japan.

In 1941, Kerner was appointed Sather Professor of History; that same year, he was awarded the Czechoslovak state prize for literature. He was made a faculty research lecturer in 1943; in 1948, he organized and served as director of the Institute of Slavic Studies at the University of California, Berkeley. Kerner was awarded the Order of the White Lion, III class; a medal of the Order of Leopold II; and the Order of the Star of Romania, officer class. He died on November 29, 1956, at Alta Bates Hospital in Berkeley.
