= John Curwen (physician) =

American physician (1821–1901)

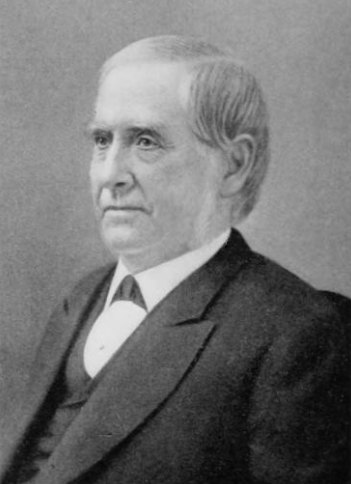
- Curwen in 1900
- Born: September 20, 1821; Lower Merion Township, Pennsylvania, US
- Died: July 2, 1901 (aged 79); Harrisburg, Pennsylvania, US
- Education: Yale University; University of Pennsylvania
- Occupation: Physician
- Spouses: Martha P. Elmer (m. 1849; died 1873) Anne F. Wyeth (m. 1881; died 1899)
- Children: 1

John Curwen (September 20, 1821 – July 2, 1901) was Superintendent of the first public mental hospital in Pennsylvania. He personally knew the thirteen founders of the Association of Medical Superintendents of American Institutions of the Insane (AMSAII), now the American Psychiatric Association. He served as secretary-treasurer of the Association for 34 years (1856–1890).

== Biography ==
Curwen was born on September 20, 1821, in Lower Merion Township, Pennsylvania. He graduated from Yale University in 1841 and received his medical degree in 1844 from the University of Pennsylvania. He spent several months at the Wills Eye Hospital and then moved to the Pennsylvania Hospital for the Insane where he remained for six years as Assistant Physician to Dr. Thomas Kirkbride. Kirkbride was acknowledged as a leader in AMSAII and with the administration of asylums. He designed plans for the construction of mental hospitals which were adopted throughout the United States in the second half of the nineteenth century. Curwen was influenced by Kirkbride's mentorship throughout his professional life.

After a memorial to the Pennsylvania Legislature by Dorothea Dix in 1844, money was appropriated to build the State Hospital for the Insane in Harrisburg, Pennsylvania. In 1851, Curwen became superintendent and remained in the post until 1881 when he moved to Warren, Pennsylvania to open an asylum. He stayed there until 1900. His tenure of 57 years in asylums remains unparalleled.

As superintendent, Curwen introduced the method of moral treatment for patients. This method fostered pleasant surroundings with minimal use of restraints, occupation and recreation therapies, and medication only as needed.

In 1851, Curwen published A Manual for Attendants in Hospitals for the Insane which he set forth the directions for the treatment of patients plus descriptions of various types of hydrotherapy and special diets.

Curwen actively participated in medical associations including county and state medical societies, and on occasions, he represented the AMSAII at annual meetings of the American Medical Association. He was a member of the American Philosophical Association, the American Philosophical Society, the British Medico-Psychological Association, and a trustee of Lafayette College.

Curwen was among the first to employ women physicians when he hired Dr. Margaret Cleaves in 1879 to be in charge of the women's division of the State Hospital for the Insane. She resigned in 1883 and Curwen hired her assistant, Dr. Jane Garver, who remained until 1900.

As secretary of the AMSAII, Curwen attended the annual meetings, participated in discussions and presented papers. He maintained the Association's archives and the Proceedings of each annual meeting was summarized and published in the American Journal of Insanity.

Curwen's book, History of the Association of Medical Superintendents of American Institutions for the Insane from 1844 to 1874 summarizes each annual meeting and appendixes of the venues of annual meetings, the officers of the Association, and state asylums. He was elected vice president of the association in 1892 and president in 1893.

Curwen married Martha P. Elmer on August 2, 1849, and they had one daughter. Martha died on May 12, 1873, and he remarried to Anne F. Wyeth on September 6, 1881. She died September 4, 1899. He died at his daughter's home in Harrisburg, Pennsylvania on July 2, 1901, aged 79.

== Works ==
- Curwen, John. A Manual for Attendants in Hospitals for the Insane, Philadelphia: Martien, 1851.
- Curwen, John, comp. History of the Association of Medical Superintendents of American Institutions for the Insane from 1844 to 1874 inclusive … [Harrisburg, PA], 1875.
- Curwen, John. The Original Thirteen Members of the Association of Medical Superintendents of American Institutions for the Insane. Warren, Pa.: Cowan, 1885.
- Curwen, John, comp. History ... from 1844-1884 inclusive, with a list of the different hospitals for the insane, and the names and dates of appointment and resignation of the medical superintendents. Warren, Pa.: Cowan, 1885.
- Curwen, John, Charles H. Nichols, John H. Callender, and Henry M. Hurd. Memoir of Thomas S. Kirkbride. Warren, Pa.: E. Cowan & Co., 1885.
