= Edward Tanjore Corwin =

American clergyman and historian (1834–1914)

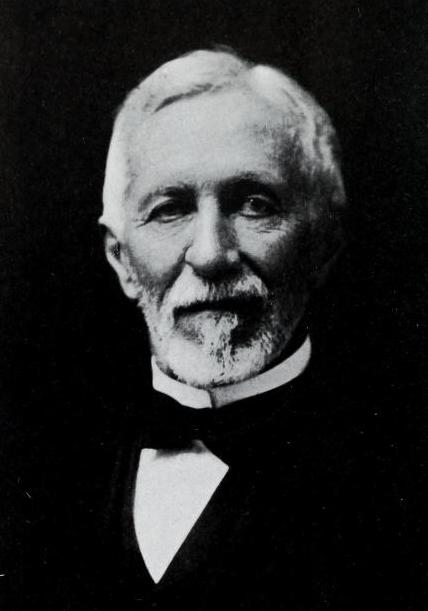
Edward Tanjore Corwin

Edward Tanjore Corwin (1834–1914) was an American clergyman, writer, and historian of the Reformed Dutch church. He was born in New York City, July 12, 1834; graduated at the College of the City of New York in 1853, and at the Theological Seminary in New Brunswick, N. J. in 1856.

His literary work made him the recognized historian of his denomination. His publications include:

- Manual of the Reformed Protestant Dutch Church in North America (1859; fourth edition, 1902)
- Millstone Centennial (1866)
- A History of the Reformed Church Dutch (1895)
- Ecclesiastical Records of New York (six volumes, Albany, 1901–05)
