= Edward Samuel Corwin =

American legal scholar (1878–1963)

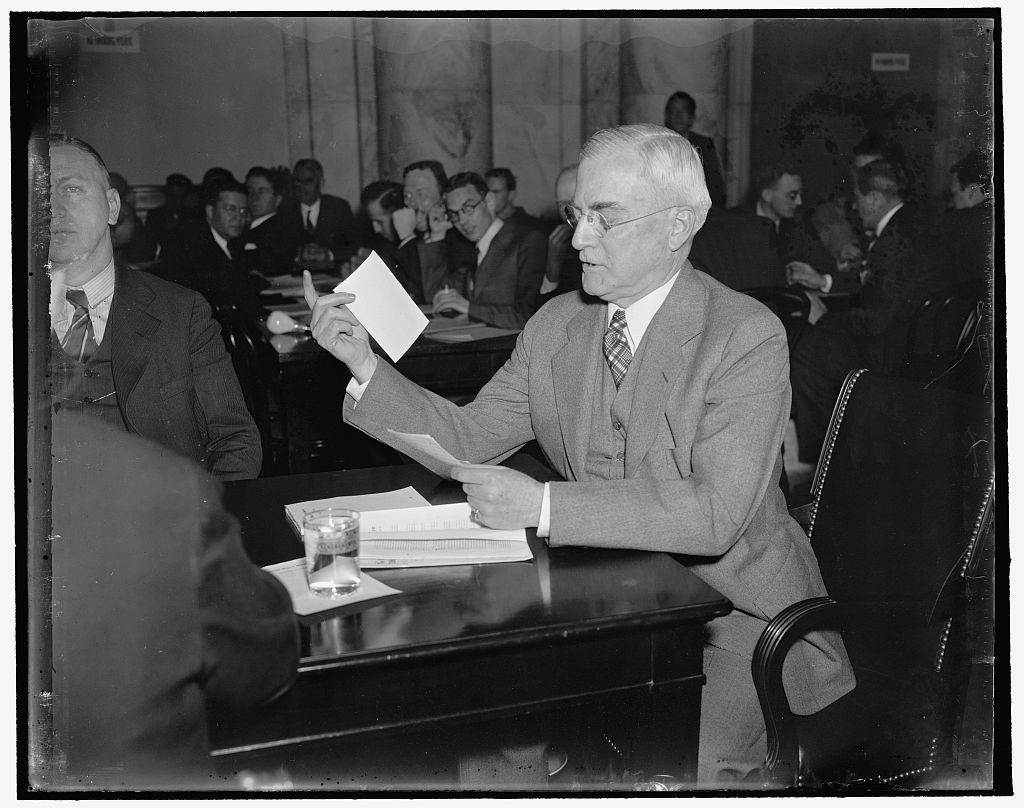
- Corwin testified before the Senate Judiciary Committee in 1937
- Born: January 19, 1878; Plymouth, Michigan, U.S.
- Died: April 23, 1963 (aged 85); Princeton, New Jersey, U.S.
- Education: University of Michigan (BA); University of Pennsylvania (PhD)
- Scientific career
- Fields: Legal history
- Thesis: French Policy and the American Alliance of 1778 (1905)
- Doctoral advisors: Andrew C. McLaughlin; William E. Lingelbach

Edward Samuel Corwin (January 19, 1878 – April 23, 1963) was an American legal scholar who served as the president of the American Political Science Association. His various political writings in the early to mid-twentieth century microcosmically depict the rising activist thinking in various areas of American, constitutional law.

== Biography ==
Corwin was born in Plymouth, Michigan, on January 19, 1878. He received his undergraduate degree from the University of Michigan in 1900 and his Ph.D. from the University of Pennsylvania in 1905. That same year, he was invited by Woodrow Wilson to join the faculty of Princeton University. He was appointed the McCormick Professor of Jurisprudence in 1908. He was elected to the American Philosophical Society in 1936. He authored many books on the constitutional law of the United States, and he remained at Princeton until his retirement in 1946. He died on April 23, 1963, and was buried in Princeton Cemetery. He was reinterred to Riverside Cemetery near his birthplace in Plymouth, Michigan, where he is buried with his wife, parents, and other family members.

A full biography of Corwin, with a comprehensive bibliography of his numerous publications, was written by Kenneth Crews and published in 1985.

== Bibliography ==
- French Policy And The American Alliance of 1778 (1916)
- John Marshall and the Constitution; a chronicle of the Supreme court (1919)
- The Constitution and What It Means Today (1920)
- The President, Office and Powers (1940)
- The Constitution and World Organization (1944)
- Total War and the Constitution (1946)
- The Constitution of the United States of America: Analysis and Interpretation (1952) (Editor)
- The "Higher Law" Background of American Constitutional Law (1965)

== See also ==
- Departmentalism
