= Alan Korwin =

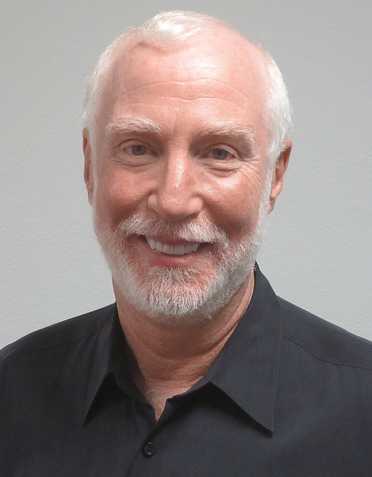
- Born: 1949 (age 76–77); Bronx, NY, U.S.
- Occupation: Author
- Known for: Gun laws
- Website: gunlaws.com

Alan Korwin (born September 2, 1949) is an American writer, author and civil- and political-rights activist whose work serves the business, legal, news and firearms industries. In 1988, Korwin founded Bloomfield Press, which has grown into the largest publisher and distributor of gun-law books in the nation. It is built around books he has written on the subject, including The Arizona Gun Owner's Guide (coauthored by Shane Krauser), Your First Gun, After You Shoot, and the unabridged federal guides Gun Laws of America and Supreme Court Gun Cases.

Invited twice to the U.S. Supreme Court to observe oral argument in Second Amendment gun-rights cases, he witnessed D.C. v. Heller, which led to his 11th book, The Heller Case: Gun Rights Affirmed and McDonald v. Chicago, in which he was an amicus. Over nearly three decades, he has written 10 of his 14 books on gun law or gun policy.

Winner of the 2013 Defender of Liberty Award, conferred by the 600,000-member Second Amendment Foundation, Korwin is based in Scottsdale, Arizona, where he owns and along with his wife Cheryl operates GunLaws.com and Bloomfield Press.

He is a founder and two-term past president of the Arizona Book Publishing Association. He has received two national awards for publicity work as a member of the Society for Technical Communication, is a past board member of the Arizona chapter of the Society of Professional Journalists, and is active with the speaker's bureau of Beltway-based news-media watchdog Accuracy In Media. He has made more than 1,000 radio and TV appearances, including all the networks and cable news stations.

Korwin wrote the business plan that raised $5 million in venture capital and launched the in-flight catalog SkyMall; he did the publicity for Pulitzer Prize cartoonist Steve Benson's fourth book Where Do You Draw the Line; working with American Express, he wrote the executive-level strategic plan that defined their worldwide telecommunications strategy for the 1990s; and he had a hand in developing ASPED, Arizona's economic strategic plan for the 1990s. Korwin's writing appears often in a wide spectrum of local and national print and online publications.

== Early life ==
Born on September 2, 1949, in the Bronx, N.Y., to Irving and Shirley Korwin, first-generation Americans of European immigrant parents. His mother was a school teacher and his father, who taught diamond setting under the G.I. Bill as a WWII veteran and opened a jewelry company, Wideband Corp., specializing in gold-coin jewelry.

== Education ==
Korwin graduated from DeWitt Clinton H.S., a 7,000-student integrated all-male school in the Bronx in 1967, after which he attended American University in Washington, D.C., for two years, followed by Long Island University, in Brooklyn, N.Y., where he graduated in 1972 with a B.A. degree in English and a minor in Journalism.

== Awards and recognition ==
- Second Amendment Foundation "Defender of Liberty/Defender of the Constitution," 2013
- "Spirit of the Old West Alive Award," 2009
- National Symposium on Handgun Violence "Distinguished Speaker," 2008
- Citizens Committee for the Right to Keep and Bear Arms (CCRKBA) "Gun Rights Defender of the Month," (1997)
- Citizens Committee for the Right to Keep and Bear Arms (CCRKBA) "Grass Roots Activist of the Year," 2005
- Arizona Book Publishing Association "Korwin Award for Visionary Leadership," 1999 (1st recipient, named after Korwin)
- Society for Technical Communication "Outstanding Performance," 1992 and 1993; "Chapter Achievement," 1988
- Adelphi University Institute of Numismatic and Philatelic Studies "Certified Numismatic Advisor" and "Rare Coin Grading and Authenticating," 1982
- Audio Engineering Society "Associate," 1973
