= Shannon's law (Arizona) =

Firearms law

Arizona State Legislature
- Full name: Shannon's Law
- Senate voted: April 2000
- Signed into law: July 2000
- Governor: Jane Dee Hull
- Bill: SB 1307

Status: Current legislation

Shannon's law refers to specific changes in Arizona statutes, enacted in 2000, making it a felony offense to discharge firearms randomly into the air.

== History ==
Shannon's law is named after Shannon Smith, a fourteen-year-old Phoenix girl killed by a stray bullet in June 1999. Smith's parents, after being informed that the assailant's activity constituted, at most, a misdemeanor offense, advocated stronger penalties, to prevent future incidents of this kind.

Otis and Lory Smith joined the board of directors for Arizonans for Gun Safety. They started a campaign that took them all over Arizona. Their efforts were supported by councilman Phil Gordon, the city council of Tucson, and president of the National Rifle Association Charlton Heston. After a speech by Governor Jane Dee Hull voicing her support, senate minority leader Jack A. Brown named passing the law a priority. The Arizona legislature failed to pass the bill twice in 1999, but it finally received both state senate and state house approval in April 2000. The bill was enacted that July, with Governor Hull signing the bill in the Smiths’ front yard.

== Enforcement ==
Violation of Shannon's law is defined as a class 6 felony offense in Arizona. However, as with most felony offenses in United States jurisdictions, a person charged with this offense can strike a plea bargain with prosecutors, and may be eligible for only a misdemeanor conviction. The decision of whether such an offer is available lies solely in the hands of the prosecutor, and presently these offenses are being charged as "dangerous" offenses, thereby making the accused ineligible for probation under state law, requiring a prison sentence even for a first offense.

On December 31, 2003, police in the city of Glendale began using equipment which alerted them to the location from which a shot was fired. As random discharge of firearms are common in some areas of the United States on New Year's Eve, Independence Day, and other holidays, four arrests of Shannon's law violators were made that night, and it is expected that more Arizona police departments will receive similar equipment.

== Shannon Smith Memorial ==
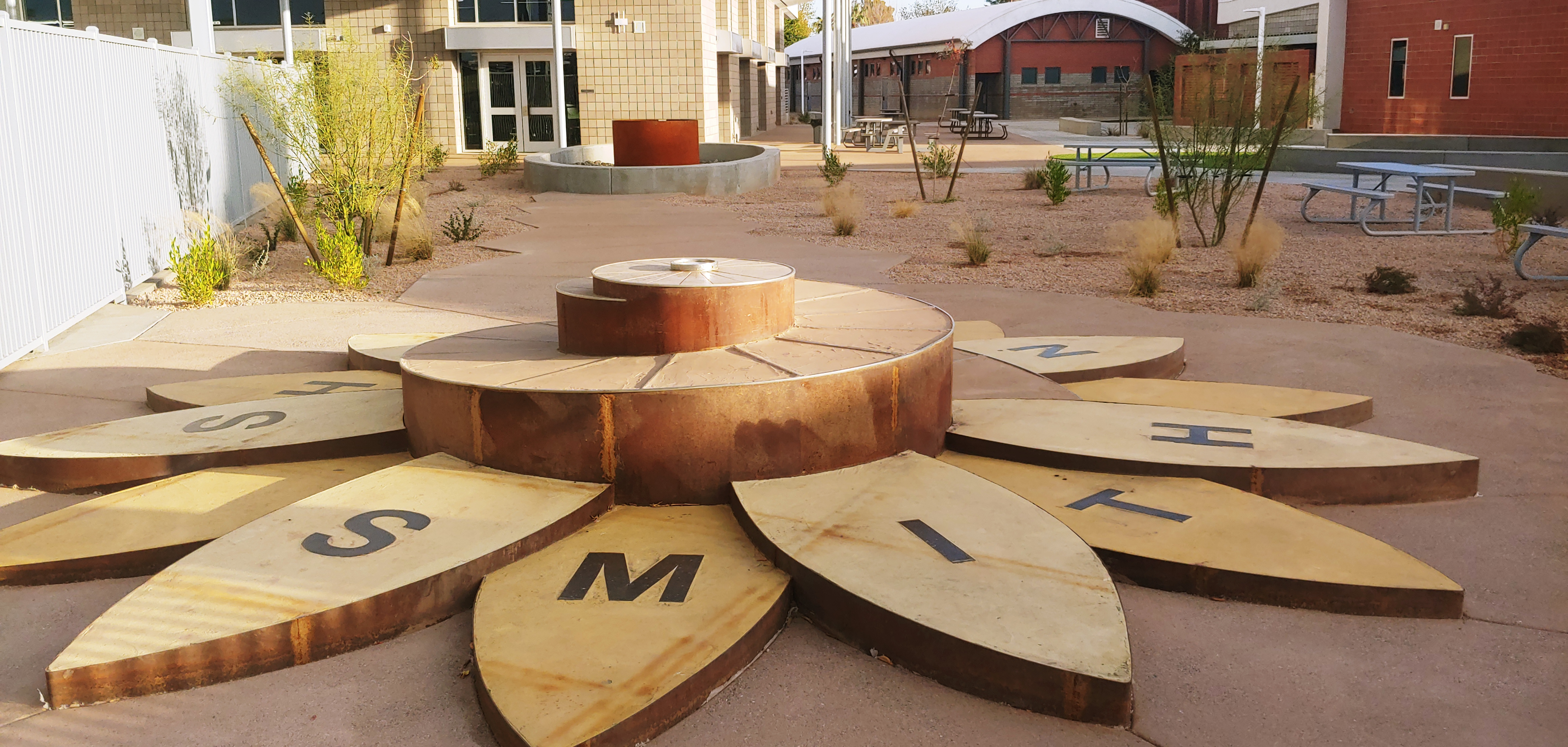
Shannon Smith Memorial

Shannon Smith had been an award-winning athlete and honor student, and had completed eighth grade a few weeks prior to her death. While she stood in her backyard talking on the telephone with a friend, a stray bullet hit her in her head, causing instant death. Smith's death sparked a furor among Arizona residents. Her funeral was attended by approximately 1,300 people. A sunflower monument, made with melted metal from confiscated firearms, was raised in her honor at Madison Meadows Middle School by her classmates and friends. Nearly $20,000 in donations for the monument were primarily raised by Shannon's friends and classmates holding car washes.

The shooter was never found.

== See also ==
- Celebratory gunfire
- Gun law in the United States
