= Vincent family =

Family of "career criminals" in Kent, England

- Territory: England
- Ethnicity: Romanichal
- Membership: a few people
- Activities: theft, fraud

The Vincent family have been described by The Times as a "family of career criminals [who] have a string of convictions for targeting elderly householders". They are part of a Romanichal community living in the London Borough of Bromley, England.

In 2011, Henry Vincent (born c. 1959) was jailed with his son, Henry Vincent Jr., for defrauding an 81 year old man by showing him a handful of maggots that he had brought with him to convince his victim that the joists of his roof were rotten. In April 2018, his wife Rosemary purchased the grade II listed Snagbrook House in Hollingbourne, Kent, from Dudley Wright for £325,000 compared with a market value estimated by The Times to be £1.7 million.

In April 2018, Henry Vincent junior died after he was stabbed by a pensioner whose home in Hither Green he was robbing with another man. The case caused a national sensation in which the ability of home-owners to defend themselves against intruders was debated after the homeowner was arrested on suspicion of murder. He was later released.

Also in April 2018, David Vincent and his son also David, an uncle and cousin of Henry Vincent junior, were jailed for defrauding a homeowner.

== See also ==
- Castle doctrine
- Defence of property
- Self-defence in English law
- Tony Martin (farmer)
