= Right of self-defense in Maryland =

In the state of Maryland, the right of self-defense is mostly governed by case law, but there is also a statute.

== General principles ==
Maryland continues to follow common law principles on the use of force in self-defense, although there is a statute (discussed below) on the subject of immunity from civil lawsuits for the use of force to defend a home or a business.

In the case of Baltimore Transit Co. v. Faulkner, 179 Md. 598, 20 A.2d 485 (1941), which involved a civil lawsuit for assault and battery, the Court of Appeals of Maryland set forth the general common law principles of the doctrine of self-defense:

The law of self-defense justifies an act done in the reasonable belief of immediate danger. If an injury was done by a defendant in justifiable self-defense, he can neither be punished criminally nor held responsible for damages in a civil action. ... One who seeks to justify an assault on the ground that he acted in self-defense must show that he used no more force than the exigency reasonably demanded. The belief of a defendant in an action for assault that the plaintiff intended to do him bodily harm cannot support a plea of self-defense unless it was such a belief as a person of average prudence would entertain under similar circumstances. The jury should accordingly be instructed that to justify assault and battery in self-defense the circumstances must be such as would have induced a rea[s]onable man of average prudence to make such an assault in order to protect himself. The question whether the belief of the defendant that he was about to be injured was a reasonable one under all the circumstances is a question for the consideration of the jury.

The Court of Appeals said in the case that, even if the plaintiff had struck the defendant's employees first, the plaintiff would still be entitled to prevail in an action for battery if the defendant's employees, in repelling the plaintiff's acts, "used unreasonable and excessive force, meaning such force as prudent men would not have used under all the circumstances of the case." Id., 179 Md. at 600, 20 A.2d at 487.

== Use of deadly force in self-defense ==
Maryland also continues to follow common law principles on the issue of when one may use deadly force in self-defense. In the case of State v. Faulkner, 301 Md. 482, 485, 483 A.2d 759, 761 (1984), the Court of Appeals of Maryland summarized those principles, and stated that a homicide, other than felony murder, is justified on the ground of self-defense if the following criteria are satisfied:

- (1) The accused must have had reasonable grounds to believe himself in apparent imminent or immediate danger of death or serious bodily harm from his assailant or potential assailant;
- (2) The accused must have in fact believed himself in this danger;
- (3) The accused claiming the right of self defense must not have been the aggressor or provoked the conflict;
- (4) The force used must have not been unreasonable and excessive, that is, the force must not have been more force than the exigency demanded.

See also Roach v. State, 358 Md. 418, 429–30, 749 A.2d 787, 793 (2000).

In addition, when one is in one's home, one may use deadly force against an attacker if deadly force is necessary to prevent the attacker from committing a felony that involves the use of force, violence, or surprise (such as murder, robbery, burglary, rape, or arson). See Crawford v. State, 231 Md. 354, 190 A.2d 538 (1963).

== Duty to retreat and the castle doctrine ==
Maryland also follows the common law rule that, outside of one's home, a person, before using deadly force in self-defense, has the duty "to retreat or avoid danger if such means were within his power and consistent with his safety". DeVaughn v. State, 232 Md. 447, 453, 194 A.2d 109, 112 (1963), cert. denied, 376 U.S. 527 (1964), quoting Bruce v. State, 218 Md. 87, 97, 145 A.2d 428, 433 (1958). See also Burch v. State, 346 Md. 253, 283, 696 A.2d 443, 458 (1997).

But a person does not have to retreat if it would not be safe for the person to do so. "[I]f the peril of the defendant was imminent, he did not have to retreat but had a right to stand his ground and to defend and protect himself." Bruce v. State, supra, 218 Md. at 97, 145 A.2d at 433.

The duty to retreat also does not apply if one is attacked in one's own home. "[A] man faced with the danger of an attack upon his dwelling need not retreat from his home to escape the danger, but instead may stand his ground and, if necessary to repel the attack, may kill the attacker." Crawford v. State, 231 Md. 354, 361, 190 A.2d 538, 541 (1963). The Court of Appeals said in Crawford, a case in which the defendant fatally shot a younger man who was attempting to break into his home to beat and rob him:

A man is not bound to retreat from his house. He may stand his ground there and kill an[y] person who attempts to commit a felony therein, or who attempts to enter by force for the purpose of committing a felony, or of inflicting great bodily harm upon an inmate. In such a case the owner or any member of the family, or even a lodger in the house, may meet the intruder at the threshold, and prevent him from entering by any means rendered necessary by the exigency, even to the taking of his life, and the homicide will be justifiable.

This principle is known as the "castle doctrine", the name being derived from the view that "'a man's home is his castle' and his ultimate retreat". Barton v. State, 46 Md. App. 616, 618, 420 A.2d 1009, 1010-1011 (1980). A man "is not bound to flee and become a fugitive from his own home, for, if that were required, there would, theoretically, be no refuge for him anywhere in the world".

A person does not have to be the owner of the home or the head of the household in order to be able to invoke the castle doctrine. Instead, "any member of the household, whether or not he or she has a proprietary or leasehold interest in the property, is within its ambit".

However, even in one's own home, the degree of force used in self-defense must not be excessive. Crawford v. State, supra, 231 Md. at 362, 190 A.2d at 542. Quoting a treatise on criminal law, the Court of Appeals said in Crawford:

It is a justifiable homicide to kill to prevent the commission of a felony by force or surprise.

The crimes in prevention of which life may be taken are such and only such as are committed by forcible means, violence, and surprise, such as murder, robbery, burglary, rape, or arson.

...

It is also essential that killing is necessary to prevent the commission of the felony in question. If other methods could prevent its commission, a homicide is not justified; all other means of preventing the crime must first be exhausted.

== Burden of proof on self-defense ==
Although self-defense is commonly called a "defense", a defendant who invokes self-defense in a criminal case in Maryland does not have the burden of proving that he or she acted in self-defense. Instead, the defendant in a criminal case only has a burden of production on the issue of self-defense. This means that a defendant who wishes to invoke the doctrine only needs to "generate the issue" by introducing some evidence that he or she acted in self-defense. If the defendant satisfies that burden of production and thus generates the issue, then it is the prosecution that has the burden of proving that the defendant did not act in self-defense. In other words, once the defendant satisfies his or her burden of production on the issue of self-defense, then the prosecution has the burden of persuasion on the issue of self-defense.

If the defendant does not generate the issue of self-defense, then the prosecution does not have to prove that the defendant had not acted in self-defense.

The Court of Appeals of Maryland adopted these principles in the case of State v. Evans, 278 Md. 197, 207–08, 362 A.2d 629, 636 (1976). The Court said allocating the burdens of production and persuasion in this manner was required by the Supreme Court's decision in Mullaney v. Wilbur, 421 U.S. 684 (1975).

In civil cases, by contrast, self-defense remains a defense, meaning that the burden of proving its applicability is on the defendant. See Baltimore Transit Co. v. Faulkner, supra, 179 Md. at 600–01, 20 A.2d at 487.

== Pattern jury instructions on self-defense in criminal cases ==
If the duty-to-retreat criterion is met, then the following self-defense criteria are examined, as contained within the Maryland Criminal Pattern Jury Instruction. Optional or alternative inclusions into the jury instruction are enclosed with < >. Phrases surrounded with () are substituted with specific instances of the case.

=== Self-defense (MPJI-Cr 5:07) ===
Self-defense is a defense, and the defendant must be found not guilty if all of the following three factors are present:

1. The defendant actually believed that <they> were in immediate and imminent danger of bodily harm.
2. The defendant's belief was reasonable.
3. The defendant used no more force than was reasonably necessary to defend <themselves> in light of the threatened or actual harm.

Deadly-force is that amount of force reasonably calculated to cause death or serious bodily harm. If the defendant is found to have used deadly-force, it must be decided whether the use of deadly-force was reasonable. Deadly-force is reasonable if the defendant actually had a reasonable belief that the aggressor's force was or would be deadly and that the defendant needed a deadly-force response.

In addition, before using deadly-force, the defendant is required to make all reasonable effort to retreat. The defendant does not have to retreat if the defendant was in <their> home, retreat was unsafe, the avenue of retreat was unknown to the defendant, the defendant was being robbed, the defendant was lawfully arresting the victim. If the defendant was found to have not used deadly-force, then the defendant had no duty to retreat.

=== Defense of others (MPJI-Cr 5:01) ===
Defense of others is a defense, and the defendant must be found not guilty if all of the following four factors are present:

1. The defendant actually believed that the person defended was in immediate and imminent danger of bodily harm.
2. The defendant's belief was reasonable.
3. The defendant used no more force than was reasonably necessary to defend the person defended in light of the threatened or actual force.
4. The defendant's purpose in using force was to aid the person defended.

=== Defense of habitation – deadly force (MPJI-Cr 5:02) ===
Defense of one's home is a defense, and the defendant must be found not guilty if all of the following three factors are present:

1. The defendant actually believed that (suspect) was committing <was just about to commit> the crime of (crime) in <at> the defendant's home.
2. The defendant's belief was reasonable.
3. The defendant used no more force than was reasonably necessary to defend against the conduct of (victim).

=== Defense of property – nondeadly force (MPJI-Cr 5:02.1) ===
Defense of property is a defense, and the defendant must be found not guilty if all of the following three factors are present:

1. The defendant actually believed that (suspect) was unlawfully interfering <was just about to unlawfully interfere> with property.
2. The defendant's belief was reasonable.
3. The defendant used no more force than was reasonably necessary to defend against the victim's interference with the property.

A person may not use deadly force to defend <his> <her> property. Deadly force is that amount of force reasonably calculated to cause death or serious bodily harm.

== Pattern jury instructions on self-defense in civil cases ==
Maryland Civil Pattern Jury Instruction 15:4(a) and (b) states:

1. Defense of Self, Another or Property
  Persons are not responsible for assault or battery if they were defending themselves, other persons, their property or their employer's property, so long as they used only such force as was reasonably necessary to protect themselves, other persons, their property, or their employer's property from actual attack or threat of imminent harm. Threat of imminent harm does not mean that one must wait until the other person makes the first move.
2. Use of Deadly Force
  A person may use deadly force only as a last resort. The person must reasonably believe that he or she or a third person was in immediate danger of serious bodily harm and that there was no other reasonable means of defense or ability to escape.

== Civil immunity ==
While the use of force in self-defense may be justifiable, the person defending himself or herself still runs the risk of being sued by the attacker for monetary damages. In 2010, the Maryland General Assembly passed, and Governor Martin O'Malley signed, a bill to address this issue and to provide for an immunity to such civil lawsuits in certain cases in which a person used force, including deadly force, to defend his or her home or business. The statute – § 5-808 of the Courts and Judicial Proceedings Article of the Maryland Code – provides as follows:

- (a) In this section, "person" does not include a governmental entity.
- (b) A person is not liable for damages for a personal injury or death of an individual who enters the person's dwelling or place of business if:
  - (1) The person reasonably believes that force or deadly force is necessary to repel an attack by the individual; and
  - (2) The amount and nature of the force used by the person is reasonable under the circumstances.
- (c) Subsection (b) of this section does not apply to a person who is convicted of a crime of violence under § 14-101 of the Criminal Law Article, assault in the second degree, or reckless endangerment arising out of the circumstances described in subsection (b) of this section.
- (d) The court may award costs and reasonable attorney's fees to a defendant who prevails in a defense under this section.
- (e) This section does not limit or abrogate any immunity from civil liability or defense available to a person under any other provision of the Code or at common law.

The statute essentially codifies the common law rule of self-defense. It is arguable that the statute makes the castle doctrine applicable to actions committed to defend a person's business. But the statute is not entirely clear on that point, because of its requirement that the force be "reasonable under the circumstances" and the absence of specific language saying that the defendant may stand his or her ground in the business. Importantly, the statute also provides that, if a defendant prevails in a defense under the statute, then the court "may" order the plaintiff to pay the defendant's costs and reasonable attorney's fees. The statute further provides that the immunity which it creates does not apply if the defendant had been convicted of certain criminal charges in connection with the incident.

By its terms, the statute does not apply to criminal prosecutions.

The General Assembly enacted the statute nine years after an incident that occurred on the night of March 19, 2001, in which one or both of the co-owners of a cement company in Glyndon, Maryland opened fire on three intruders on the company's premises, killing one of them and wounding the other two. The company's premises had also been burglarized the two previous nights, and the two co-owners (who were brothers) were staying overnight at the business to guard it. In February 2004, the estate and young son of the deceased intruder sued the two brothers and their company for damages. According to online records of the Maryland court system, the plaintiffs dropped the lawsuit on January 28, 2005. It is not stated in the online records whether or not the case was settled.

Within days of the shooting in 2001, bills were introduced in each of the two chambers of the General Assembly to shield business owners from civil lawsuits for deadly force against a person "who unlawfully and forcefully enters" the business. The state Senate passed its bill, but the House of Delegates took no action on the measure or on the bill that had been introduced in the House. In 2004, 2005, 2008, and 2009, the House of Delegates passed bills on the subject, but none of the bills made it out of committee in the state Senate. The statute that the General Assembly enacted in 2010 had wording that was different from the language of the prior bills.

== See also ==
- Castle doctrine
