= Tony Martin (farmer) =

English farmer (1944–2025)

- Born: Anthony Edward Martin; 16 December 1944; Wisbech, Cambridgeshire, England
- Died: 2 February 2025 (aged 80); King's Lynn, Norfolk, England
- Occupation: Farmer
- Known for: Sparking nationwide debate on self-defence rights
- Motive: To defend his home from burglars
- Criminal charge: Murder (changed to manslaughter on appeal)
- Penalty: Life imprisonment with a recommended minimum term of 9 years (reduced to 8 years, then on appeal to 5 years for manslaughter with a 3-year concurrent sentence for wounding)

Details
- Victims: Brendon Fearon (injured); Fred Barras (killed)
- Date: 20 August 1999
- Locations: Emneth Hungate, England
- Killed: 1
- Injured: 1
- Weapon: Pump action Winchester Model 1300 12-gauge shotgun

Anthony Edward Martin (16 December 1944 – 2 February 2025) was an English farmer who shot two Irish Travellers burglarising his home on 20 August 1999. One burglar died at the scene and the other escaped injured. There was sympathy for Martin from people who supported the right to defend their own homes, but prosecutors cast doubt on his evidence and pointed out that he did not hold a firearm certificate. He was convicted of murder, which was later reduced to manslaughter on grounds of diminished responsibility, and served three years in prison after being denied parole.

== Early life ==
Martin was born in Wisbech, Cambridgeshire, on 16 December 1944. Part of a prosperous farming family, he attended private schools in Norfolk and Oxfordshire. At school, although a successful sportsman, he was not academically gifted. Aged 17, he left school and started travelling, working on Australian farms and as a steward on ocean liners. He also worked on Scottish oil rigs, but eventually returned to the family farm to run a piggery. In 1979 he inherited Bleak House, a Victorian property near Emneth Hungate, from an aunt and uncle.

== Burglary and shooting ==
Martin lived alone at his farmhouse, Bleak House, in Emneth Hungate, Norfolk. He claimed that he had been burgled 10 times over the years, losing £6,000 worth of furniture, though police stated they were unsure whether all of the incidents actually occurred. He also complained about police inaction over the burglaries and claimed that multiple items and furniture were stolen, including dinnerware and a grandfather clock. Martin had equipped himself with an illegally held pump-action Winchester Model 1300 12-bore shotgun, which he claimed to have found.

Changes in legislation in 1988, resulting from the Hungerford massacre, had changed the licensing treatment of semi-automatic and pump-action shotguns with a magazine capacity of more than two to equate to that of a firearm, requiring a valid firearms certificate.

Martin had his shotgun certificate revoked in 1994 after he found a man stealing apples in his orchard and shot a hole in the back of his vehicle.

Twenty-nine-year-old Brendon Fearon and 16-year-old Fred Barras, Irish Travellers, with a total of 114 convictions between them, from Newark-on-Trent, broke into Martin's house on the evening of 20 August 1999.

Shooting downwards in the dark with his shotgun loaded with birdshot, Martin shot three times towards the intruders, once when they were in the stairwell and twice more when they were trying to flee through the window of an adjacent ground floor room. Barras was hit in the back and both sustained gunshot injuries to their legs. Both escaped through the window but Barras died at the scene. Martin claimed that he opened fire after being woken when the intruders smashed a window. The prosecution accused him of lying in wait for the burglars and opening fire without warning from close range, in retribution for previous break-ins at his home.

On 10 January 2000, Fearon and 33-year-old Darren Bark (who had acted as the getaway driver), also from Newark-on-Trent, admitted to conspiring to burgle Martin's farmhouse. Fearon was sentenced to three years in prison, and Bark to two and a half years (with an additional 12 months arising from previous offences). Fearon served half his sentence and was released on 10 August 2001. Barras had already been convicted of a total of 29 offences by the time of his death at the age of 16, including assault, seven convictions for theft and six for fraud. He had been sentenced to two months in a young offenders' institution for assaulting a police officer, theft and being drunk and disorderly. On the night he was killed, Barras had just been released on bail after being accused of stealing garden furniture. His grandmother, Mary Dolan, said: "It's not fair that the farmer has got all the money and he is the one that took Fred away."

== Murder trial ==
On 23 August 1999, Martin was charged with the murder of Barras, the attempted murder of Fearon, "wounding with intent to cause injury" to Fearon and "possessing a firearm with intent to endanger life". Martin did not hold a valid shotgun certificate, let alone the more restrictive firearms certificate he would have needed to possess the Winchester pump-action shotgun that held a maximum of five rounds. There was sympathy for Martin from people who supported the right to defend their own homes, but prosecutors cast doubt on his evidence.

English law at the time permitted a person to kill another in self-defence only if the person defending themself uses no more than "reasonable force"; it is the responsibility of the jury to determine whether or not an unreasonable amount of force was used. The jury at the trial were told that they had the option of returning a verdict of manslaughter rather than murder, if they thought that Martin "did not intend to kill or cause serious bodily harm". However, the jurors found Martin guilty of murder by a 10 to 2 majority.

Martin was sentenced to life imprisonment, with a recommended minimum term to serve of nine years, soon afterwards reduced to eight years by the Lord Chief Justice.

== Appeal ==
Martin was told he would have to sell his farm to pay for an appeal against his convictions. He did not qualify for legal aid because he owned his house and hundreds of acres of land attached to it.

Martin's appeal against his convictions and sentence was first considered in October 2001 by three senior judges headed by Lord Woolf LCJ. Submissions by the defence that Martin had fired in his own defence were rejected by the appeal court. On this occasion, the defence also submitted evidence that Martin was diagnosed with paranoid personality disorder exacerbated by depression and that his paranoia was specifically directed at anyone intruding into his home; he was also diagnosed with Asperger syndrome. This submission was accepted by the Court of Appeal and, on the grounds of diminished responsibility, Martin's murder conviction was replaced by manslaughter carrying a five-year sentence, and his ten-year sentence for wounding Fearon was reduced to three years. These sentences were to run concurrently. Martin was refused permission to appeal the new sentence to the House of Lords.

== Parole applications and release ==
Martin was imprisoned at Highpoint Prison at Stradishall in Suffolk following his conviction. When he became eligible for parole and early release in January 2003, the parole board rejected his application without stating a reason.

In an interview with The Times, parole board chairman Sir David Hatch described Martin as "a very dangerous man" who might still believe his action had been right.

Martin challenged the decision in the High Court, where the parole board's decision was upheld. Probation officers on Martin's cases said there was an "unacceptable risk" that Martin might again react with excessive force if other would-be burglars intruded on his Norfolk farm. On 28 July 2003, Martin was released after serving three years of his five-year sentence, the maximum period for which he could be held following good behaviour.

== Later life ==
=== Compensation claim ===
In 2003, Fearon received an estimated £5,000 of legal aid to sue Martin for loss of earnings due to the injuries he had sustained. However, the case was thrown into doubt when photographs were published in The Sun, showing him "cycling and climbing with little apparent difficulty" suggesting that Fearon's injuries were not as serious as had been claimed. While the case was pending, Fearon was recalled to gaol after being charged with the theft of a vehicle while on probation following a conviction for dealing heroin. Fearon later dropped the case when Martin agreed to drop a counterclaim.

Nick Makin, Martin's solicitor, said: "It is appalling that the family of someone who has a criminal record for burglary and assault should attempt to claim any damages of criminal injury when he was shot while burgling the dwelling of an innocent person ... It is also appalling that they may get legal aid while his victim is in prison and patently unable to work and equally cannot get legal aid ... There is something wrong and perverse with our legal system that it permits this."

=== Bounties and political activity ===
The BBC reported in 2003 that Fearon's supporters put a bounty on Martin's head of several tens of thousands of pounds. In July, The Daily Telegraph reported that a cousin of Barras had said that a £60,000 bounty had been put on Martin's head. In October, the Daily Mirror paid Martin £125,000 for an exclusive interview on his release from prison. After investigation, the Press Complaints Commission ruled that the payment was justified and in the public interest because Martin "had a unique insight into an issue of great public concern".

Following his release, Martin made public appearances as a supporter of the right-wing populist UK Independence Party and was the guest of honour at the Annual Dinner hosted at Simpson's-in-the-Strand by the far-right pressure group Traditional Britain Group in November 2003. He also attended meetings of the far-right, fascist political party National Front in Norfolk, and later went on to endorse the far-right and fascist British National Party. One of Martin's uncles by marriage, Andrew Fountaine, was a founding member of the National Front.

== Illness and death ==
Martin suffered a stroke in December 2024. He died at Queen Elizabeth Hospital in King's Lynn, Norfolk, on 2 February 2025, aged 80. (Note: Initially, BBC News incorrectly reported that he had died at Wisbech Hospital.) When Martin's probate was proved in February 2026, the value of his estate was given at £2,567,795, accredited to inheritance. Martin left the entirety of his estate to Jacqueline Wadley, the landlady of a Wisbech pub, and her husband, with whom he had developed a close friendship following his release from prison in 2003. In May 2026, part of Martin's farm was offered for sale in separate plots for £1.378m total. Offers were invited for Bleak House, site of the 1999 shooting.

== Books and television ==
- Martin, T. (with John McVicar – editor) (2004), A Right to Kill? : Tony Martin's Story, Artnik, ISBN 1-903906-36-9, ISBN 978-1-903906-36-1.
- Saunders, J. (2001), Tony Martin and the Bleak House Tragedy, True Crime Library/Forum Press, ISBN 1-874358-37-0, ISBN 978-1-874358-37-4.
- Turney, B. (2005), Wanted, Waterside Press, ISBN 1-904380-13-1, ISBN 978-1-90653-464-6.
- The Interrogation of Tony Martin, a television film based partly on transcripts of police interviews of Martin. It was directed by Dave Nath and Martin was played by Steve Pemberton. It was broadcast on Channel 4 in November 2018.

== See also ==
- Castle doctrine
- Death of John Ward
- Defence of property
- Joe Horn shooting controversy
- Katko v. Briney
- Munir Hussain case
- Self-defence in English law
- Vincent family
