= American Mind =

American Mind can refer to:

- American mind, a concept postulated in Runyan v. State, an 1877 Indiana court case that argued against the duty to retreat
- The American Mind, a publication by the Claremont Institute
- The Closing of the American Mind, 1987 book by Allan Bloom
- The Coddling of the American Mind, 2018 book by Greg Lukianoff and Jonathan Haidt
- The Occupation of the American Mind, 2016 documentary film
- Scientific American Mind, a former American popular science magazine
