= People v. Gleghorn =

People v. Gleghorn, California Court of Appeal, 193 Cal. App. 3d 196, 238 Cal. Rptr. 82 (1987), is a legal case illustrative of when a defendant forfeits his right to self-defense, because his own uncharged culpable acts set in motion the conditions in which self-defense would be needed; he caused the condition of his own defense. This principle put forth by the court as to the underlying murder case was generalized to other kinds of cases.

The court wrote:

"Not every assault gives rise to the right to kill in self-defense... Generally, if one makes a felonious assault upon another... the original assailant cannot slay his adversary in self-defense unless he has first, in good faith, declined further combat, and has fairly notified him that he has abandoned the affray. However, when the victim of simple assault responds in a sudden and deadly counterassault, the original aggressor need not attempt to withdraw and may use reasonable force in self-defense."

This principle put forth by the court as to the underlying murder case was generalized to other kinds of cases "where the actor is not only culpable as to causing the defense conditions, but also has a culpable state of mind as to causing himself to engage in the conduct constituting the offense, the state should punish him for causing the ultimate justified or excused conduct."

In its opinion, the court noted the unusual nature of the underlying facts in the case:

"May a person who enters the habitat of another at 3 o'clock in the morning for the announced purpose of killing him, and who commences to beat the startled sleeper's bed with a stick and set fires under him, be entitled to use deadly force in self defense after the intended victim shoots him in the back with an arrow? Upon these bizarre facts, we hold that he may not..."
