= State of Idaho v. Robert Dean Hall =

2011 criminal case in Idaho, US

State of Idaho v. Robert Dean Hall is a criminal case occurring in 2011 involving the fatal shooting of Emmett Corrigan, a local attorney, by Robert Hall in Meridian, Idaho, US. The case gained media attention due to Hall's claim of self-defense against Corrigan. A jury found Hall guilty of second-degree murder, later confirmed during an appeal process.

== Background ==
The case began when the victim, Emmett Corrigan had an affair with his employee, Kandi Hall who was married to the Defendant Robert Hall. Corrigan had hired Kandi as a paralegal in 2010. Shortly after Kandi was hired, an affair began between her and her employer. As the two continued their affair, Rob Hall began to be suspicious. The situation came to a head when on March 11, 2011, Corrigan and Kandi Hall met to discuss a potential divorce process for Kandi and Rob. Later on, after an argument at her shared home with Rob in Meridian, Kandi left the house to pick up a prescription from a local Walgreens. She met Corrigan there, and got in his vehicle. Having heard of the fight, Corrigan picked up an incoming call on Kandi's phone from Rob, and "threatened him".

The shooting occurred in the Walgreen's parking lot in Meridian. Surveillance footage shows Rob Hall arriving at the scene and pacing. Kandi testified witnessing a "heated verbal and physical confrontation" between the two men. Kandi attempted to step between the men, but walked away from the scuffle and reported hearing multiple gunshots.

Corrigan was shot once in the chest and once in the head, and died at the scene. Robert Hall sustained a surface gunshot wound to the side of his head, which reportedly caused amnesia and a lack of recollection of the incident.

== Trial ==
The trial for Robert Hall in Ada County lasted for over two weeks. Hall's defense team maintained that he was acting in self-defense against Corrigan. His legal team additionally argued that the amnesia prevented Hall from being able to accurately recall what happened during the confrontation and shooting.

In contrast, the prosecution argued that Hall's actions were premeditated, as he had driven to the scene armed and prepared to confront Corrigan. The jury found Robert Hall guilty of second-degree murder and the use of a firearm in a crime. In 2012, Hall was sentenced to 30 years in prison, eligible for parole after 17.5 years.

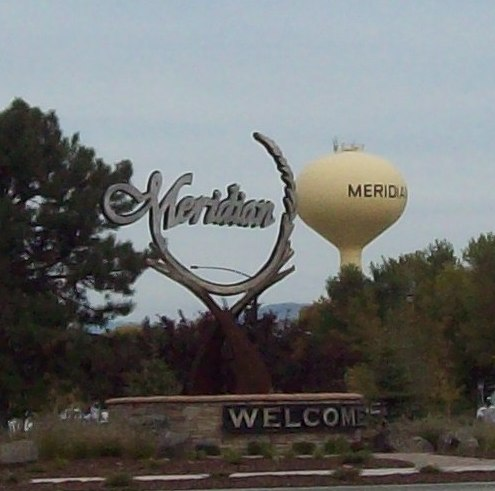
Meridian, Idaho

== Appeal ==
After being convicted, Hall began to appeal. He argued that the jury was not properly educated on what constituted a case of "self-defense". His attorneys mentioned that under Idaho Law, a homicide is justifiable if also done while avoiding "great bodily injury." They claimed, as did Hall, that the jury was not aware of this statute.

Additionally, Hall called to attention several Facebook posts that Corrigan had made years earlier, showing a tendency for violence. Hall's defense team argued that these posts were relevant to the case.

Ultimately, the court decided that the standard self-defense education had been given to the jury, and the Facebook posts by Corrigan were not substantial enough to uphold Hall's appeal. Hall's conviction of second-degree murder and use of a firearm during a crime was upheld in 2016 by the Idaho Supreme Court.

== Media coverage ==
The State of Idaho v. Robert Dean Hall case gained a significant amount of media coverage due to the involvement of a local attorney and the love triangle between the three involved parties. The story was also featured on an episode of Dr. Phil and true crime shows such as Investigation Discovery and Dateline NBC, bringing national attention to the crime.
