= Imperfect self-defense =

Common law doctrine

Imperfect self-defense is a common law doctrine recognized by some jurisdictions whereby a defendant may mitigate punishment or sentencing imposed for a crime involving the use of deadly force by claiming, as a partial affirmative defense, the honest but unreasonable belief that the actions were necessary to counter an attack. Not all jurisdictions accept imperfect self-defense as a basis to reduce a murder charge.

- Self-defense: A perfect argument of self-defense proves all elements of self-defense, and results in the defendant's acquittal. If a defendant proves imperfect self-defense, the defendant will be convicted of a lesser homicide charge, such as voluntary manslaughter.
- Imperfect self-defense: The concept of imperfect self-defense is that, although not all elements of self-defense were proved, extenuating circumstances nonetheless partially excuse the act that caused death.

== Examples ==
The doctrine of imperfect self-defense has been defined as "an intentional killing committed with an unreasonable but honest belief that circumstances justified deadly force". Thus, if a person had a good faith belief that deadly force was necessary to repel an attack, but the person's belief was unreasonable, that person would be able to raise imperfect self-defense as a defense to a murder charge.

A court in Maryland, held that:

When evidence is presented showing the defendant’s subjective belief that the use of force was necessary to prevent imminent death or serious bodily harm, the defendant is entitled to a proper instruction on imperfect self defense....The theory underlying the doctrine is that when a defendant uses deadly force with an honest but unreasonable belief that it is necessary to defend himself, the element of malice, necessary for a murder conviction, is lacking.

State v. Faulkner, 483 A.2d 759, 769 (Md. 1984).

Michigan recognizes imperfect self-defense as a qualified defense that may mitigate second-degree murder to voluntary manslaughter. However, the doctrine can only be used where the defendant would have had a right to self-defense but for the fact that the defendant was the initial aggressor.

In the U.S. state of California a defendant can be convicted of manslaughter but not murder when imperfect self-defense is successfully proven.

== See also ==
- Right of self-defense
- Castle doctrine
