= Grainger v. State =

Grainger v. State (1830) is a Tennessee case, known as the timid hunter case, which significantly increased the right of violent self defense in the United States. The court denied the duty to retreat when a hunter fled rather than stand his ground, scathingly referring to a hunter as a "timid, cowardly man".
