= New York v. Tomlins =

New York v. Tomlins, 107 N.E. 496 (N.Y. 1914), is a criminal case in which it was found when a defendant claims self defense, that there is no duty to retreat from one's own home. The court wrote, "It is not now and has never been the law that a man assailed in his own dwelling is bound to retreat."
