= Self-defence (Sweden) =

In Sweden, the law of self-defence (Swedish: nödvärn) allows a person attacked to excuse or justify a proportionate use of violence in defence of the person or property.

== The law ==
Chapter 24 of the Swedish criminal code states various conditions for which a person will not be sentenced in court for committing an otherwise criminal act. Self-defence is considered grounds for non-conviction if the accused acted in a situation of peril and acted in a manner that is not "blatantly unjustifiable" in relation to that which is defended.

A situation of peril is stated to exist if:

1. a person is subjected to, or is in imminent danger of being subjected to, a criminal attack against property or person, or
2. a person through threats, force or violence is prevented from taking back stolen property found on criminals "red handed", or
3. an intruder attempts to enter a room, house, estate or ship, or
4. another person refuses to leave a residence after being told to.

The interpretation of what is to be considered not "blatantly unjustifiable" is popularly expressed in Sweden as "that force which is required by the peril". In other words, the defending party may do whatever it takes so long as no alternative, less severe options are available (except fleeing the immediate area NJA 1969 p425, 1999 p460). The expression "blatantly unjustifiable" allows fairly generous tolerance towards the defending party.

However, the defending party must also consider that which is defended and what injury is inflicted upon the attacker. If that which is defended is insignificant in comparison to the injuries to the attacker, the court may reject the claim that person acted in self-defence since the damage done to the attacker is "blatantly unjustifiable". Loss of life or permanent bodily injury is rarely justified as self-defence unless the defending party was in danger of being subjected to the same.

For example, if the only way of stopping a criminal from escaping with stolen property would be by killing them, then it would not be justifiable to do so. This is because that which is defended (property) is not as valuable as a human life and therefore the action of killing the criminal is not justifiable.

=== Subjective peril ===
Swedish legal custom in regards to self-defence states that peril is subjective. This means that the peril is measured from what the defending party perceived as peril and not the actual peril.

For example, if a person were to threaten someone with an unloaded gun (not an actual lethal threat), the defending party would not be convicted if defending themselves as if the gun were loaded (a lethal threat). This is because the defending party may perceive the gun as loaded and thus lethal.

=== Excess ===
A person who commits acts which are "blatantly unjustifiable" while in peril may also escape conviction if the situation were such that the person "could not be expected to maintain control of himself". For instance, such a situation might be if the defending party were in a state of great fear or severe rage because of the peril.

=== Defence of others ===
The Swedish criminal code states that anyone who assists a defending party in peril shall have the same rights as the defending party.

== See also ==
- Battered woman syndrome
- defence of property
- Self-defence (Australia)
- Self-defence in English law
- Self-defense (United States)
- Use of force
