= Dromi =

Dromi (Hebrew: דרומי) is a Hebrew surname. Notable people with the surname include:

- Naveh Dromi (1985–2015), Israeli journalist, publicist and TV presenter
- Pnina Dromi, birth name of Pnina Gary Israeli actress and theatre director
- Roberto José Dromi (1945–2024) Argentinian politician and lawyer
- Shai Dromi, Israeli farmer who shot and killed a Bedouin intruder, an event that gave rise to the "Dromis' Law" of self-defense
- Uri Dromi, Israeli journalist and editor
