= Meitar =

Town in southern Israel

Meitar מֵיתָר
- Local council (from 1987)

Hebrew transcription(s)
  - ISO 259: Meitar
  - Also spelled: Metar (official)
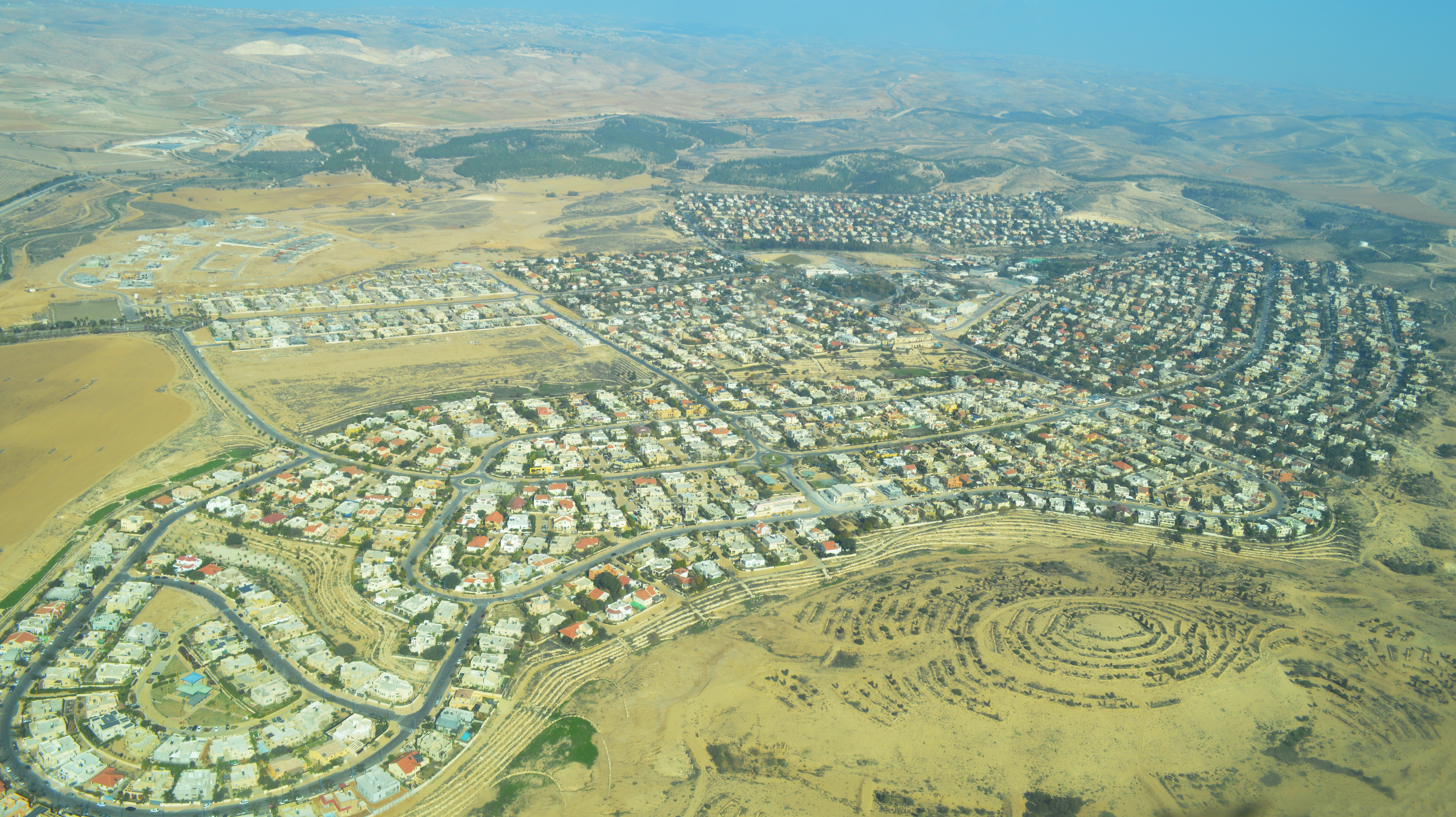

- Location within Northern Negev region of Israel
- Coordinates: 31°19′38″N 34°56′19″E
- Country: Israel
- District: Southern
- Subdistrict: Beersheba
- Natural Region: Be'er Sheva
- Founded: 1984
- Founder: Bezalel Geber

Government
  - Head of Municipality: Shimon Peretz

Area
  - Total: 16,696 dunams (16.696 km^{2}; 6.446 sq mi)

Population (2024)
  - Total: 11,608
  - Density: 695.26/km^{2} (1,800.7/sq mi)
- Name meaning: string (of a tent, reflected in logo)

Meitar (Hebrew: מֵיתָר) is a small town northeast of Beersheba, in Israel's Southern District. The town lies on Highway 60 south of the Green Line on the southern edge of Mount Hebron, alongside the Yatir Forest. Meitar is 19 km north of Beer-Sheva and is in between the two Bedouin towns of Hura and Laqiya. In 2024 it had a population of 11,608.

With a land area of 16,696 dunams (~16.7 km^{2}), Meitar is ranked very highly on the Israeli socio-economic scale, with a score of 9/10.

== History ==
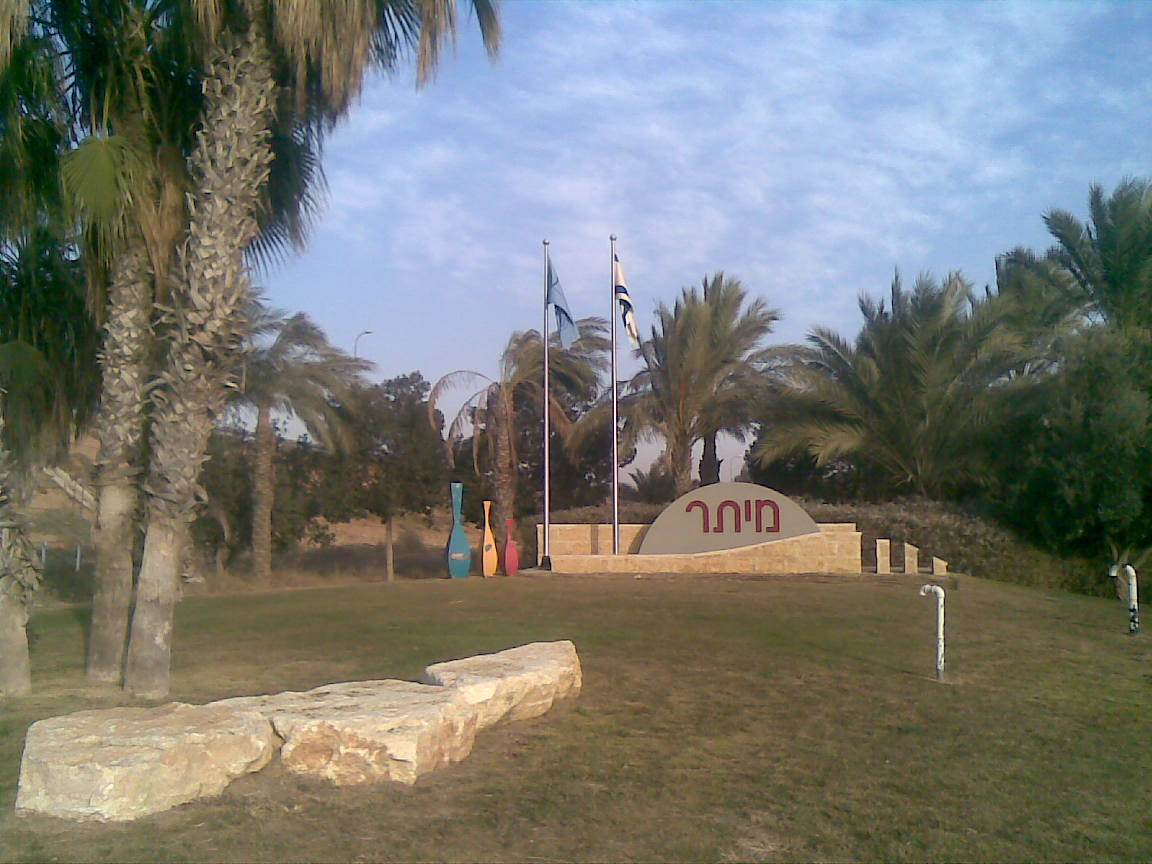
Entrance to Meitar

Meitar was founded in 1984. The area drew national attention during the Shai Dromi trial.

== Demographics ==
Historical population
Year	Pop.	±%
1995	4,700	—
2008	6,100	+29.8%
2022	11,207	+83.7%
2024	11,609	+3.6%

== Voting Patterns ==
In the 2022 election, 52 percent of voters in Meitar voted for the parties of the center-left coalition led by Yair Lapid, while 43 percent voted for the parties of the right-wing coalition led by Benjamin Netanyahu and 1 percent voted for the Arab parties.

In the 2026 election, 50 percent of voters in Meitar voted for the parties of the center-left coalition led by Gadi Eisenkot, while 40 percent voted for the parties of the right-wing coalition led by Benjamin Netanyahu and 1.6 percent voted for the Arab parties. An additional 4.5 percent voted for the Reservists, and 3.5 percent voted for Amcha Yisrael. Voter turnout increased 14 percent from the 2022 election.
