= Snagbrook House =

Building in Hollingbourne, Kent, England

Coordinates: 51.2639°N 0.6343°E

Snagbrook House is a grade II listed house in Hollingbourne, near Maidstone, in the county of Kent, England. It dates from the 16th century but has a 19th-century facade of red brick, mainly in English bond, with a grey brick diaper pattern. The house and its 40-acre estate was purchased in April 2018 by Rosemary Vincent, wife of Henry Vincent, a convicted fraudster, from Dudley Wright for £325,000 compared with a market value estimated by The Times to be £1.7 million.
