= People v. La Voie =

People v. La Voie, Supreme Court of Colorado, 395 P.2d 1001 (1964), is a legal case in which deadly force was justified because the defendant had a reasonable belief that the deceased threatened defendant with deadly or grievous harm.

Charles E. La Voie was returning home from work in Jefferson County when his car was intentionally rammed and pushed through a red light. After the car came to a stop, four men got out of the instigating car and began approaching Mr. La Voie in a menacing manner. He shot the man closest to him who died at the scene.

The case is illustrative of the legal concept of a perfect self-defense. The court wrote (citing a previous ruling in Young v. People, 47 Colo. 352):

"When a person has reasonable grounds for believing, and does in fact actually believe, that danger of his being killed, or of receiving great bodily harm, is imminent, he may act on such appearances and defend himself, even to the extent of taking human life when necessary, although it may turn out that the appearances were false, or although he may have been mistaken as to the extent of the real actual danger."
