= Erwin v. State =

American legal case in Ohio

Erwin v. State, 29 Ohio St. 186, 199 (1876), is a criminal case in which the court rejected the duty to retreat when using deadly force in self-defense. The court wrote that a faultless "true man" would not retreat.

Using "famous language", the court wrote:

The law, out of tenderness for human life and the frailty of human nature, will not permit the taking of it to repel mere trespass, or even to save a life where the assault is provoked; but a true man who is without fault is not obliged to fly from an assailant, who by violence of surprise maliciously seeks to take his life or do him enormous bodily harm.
