= Self-defense (United States) =

Form of affirmative defense in response and justification of violent or immediate acts

In the United States, self-defense is an affirmative defense that is used to justify the use of force by one person against another person under specific circumstances.

== General rule ==
In the U.S., the general rule is that "[a] person is privileged to use such force as reasonably appears necessary to defend him or herself against an apparent threat of unlawful and immediate violence from another." In cases involving non-deadly force, this means that the person must reasonably believe that their use of force was necessary to prevent imminent, unlawful physical harm. When the use of deadly force is involved in a self-defense claim, the person must also reasonably believe that their use of deadly force is immediately necessary to prevent the other's infliction of great bodily harm or death. Most states no longer require a person to retreat before using deadly force. In the minority of jurisdictions which do require retreat, there is no obligation to retreat when it is unsafe to do so or when one is inside one's own home.

=== Exceptions, limitations, and imperfect defense ===
A person who was the initial aggressor cannot claim self-defense as a justification unless they abandon the combat or the other party has responded with excessive force. If the aggressor has abandoned the combat, they normally must attempt to communicate that abandonment to the other party.

In the past, one could resist an unlawful arrest and claim self-defense, however the modern trend is to move away from that rule. In most jurisdictions allowing a person to resist an unlawful arrest, the state requires that the unlawful arrest be accompanied by excessive force. The older view is represented by the U.S. Supreme Court case Bad Elk v. United States where an off-duty Sioux police officer was granted a new trial after being convicted of killing an on-duty police officer who was attempting to illegally arrest the man, because, at the initial trial, the jury was not instructed that it could convict on a lesser offense, such as manslaughter.

In some jurisdictions, there is an imperfect self-defense rule, where an individual who mistakenly believes that he was justified in using deadly force in self-defense, but is not legally justified, may have a murder conviction reduced to a manslaughter conviction instead.

=== Retreat ===
A majority of U.S. jurisdictions do not follow the common law rule that a person must retreat prior to using deadly force, but rather have rejected this theory via statutory law in what are known as "stand your ground laws", which explicitly remove the duty to retreat. Whether the person retreated may, however, be relevant as to the reasonableness of the use of deadly force, where there isn't an explicit statutory law which affirmatively removes the duty. Under the common law rule and the rule in a minority of states, the actor must have shown that he or she retreated prior to using deadly force unless: 1) it was not safe to retreat; or 2) the incident occurred at the actor's home. In addition, the Model Penal Code requires retreat or compliance, if it can be done with complete safety.

== See also ==
- Right of self-defense
- Use of force
