= Affirmative defense =

Category of defense strategies that allege mitigating circumstances to achieve acquittal

An affirmative defense to a civil lawsuit or criminal charge is a fact or set of facts other than those alleged by the plaintiff or prosecutor which, if proven by the defendant, defeats or mitigates the legal consequences of the defendant's otherwise unlawful conduct. In civil lawsuits, affirmative defenses include the statute of limitations, the statute of frauds, waiver, and other affirmative defenses such as, in the United States, those listed in Rule 8 (c) of the Federal Rules of Civil Procedure. In criminal prosecutions, examples of affirmative defenses are self defense, insanity, entrapment and the statute of limitations.

== Description ==
In an affirmative defense, the defendant may concede that they committed the alleged acts, but they prove other facts which, under the law, either justify or excuse their otherwise wrongful actions, or otherwise overcomes the plaintiff's claim. In criminal law, an affirmative defense is sometimes called a justification or excuse defense. Consequently, affirmative defenses limit or excuse a defendant's criminal culpability or civil liability.

A clear illustration of an affirmative defense is self defense. In its simplest form, a criminal defendant may be exonerated if he can demonstrate that he had an honest and reasonable belief that another's use of force was unlawful and that the defendant's conduct was necessary to protect himself or someone else.

Most affirmative defenses must be pleaded in a timely manner by a defendant in order for the court to consider them, or else they are considered waived by the defendant's failure to assert them. The classic unwaivable affirmative defense is lack of subject-matter jurisdiction. The issue of timely assertion is often the subject of contentious litigation.

=== The insanity plea ===
Among the most controversial affirmative defenses is the insanity defense, whereby a criminal defendant seeks to be excused from criminal liability on the ground that a mental illness, at the time of the alleged crime, prevented him or her from understanding the wrongful nature of his or her actions.

=== Burden of proof ===
Because an affirmative defense requires an assertion of facts beyond those claimed by the plaintiff, generally the party who offers an affirmative defense bears the burden of proof. The standard of proof is typically lower than beyond a reasonable doubt. It can either be proved by clear and convincing evidence or by a preponderance of the evidence.

In this respect, affirmative defenses differ from ordinary defenses—claim of right, alibi, infancy, necessity, and self-defense (which is an affirmative defense at common law)—in which the prosecution has the burden of disproving beyond a reasonable doubt.

=== Governing rules ===
Rule 8 of the Federal Rules of Civil Procedure governs the assertion of affirmative defenses in civil cases that are filed in the United States district courts. Rule 8(c) specifically enumerates the following defenses: "accord and satisfaction, arbitration and award, assumption of risk, contributory negligence, discharge in bankruptcy, estoppel, failure of consideration, fraud, illegality, injury by fellow servant, laches, license, payment, release, res judicata, statute of frauds, statute of limitations, waiver, and any other matter constituting an avoidance or affirmative defense."

Rule 11 of the Federal Rules of Civil Procedure requires that affirmative defenses be based on "knowledge, information, and belief, formed after an inquiry reasonable under the circumstances," and cannot consist of a laundry list of all known affirmative defenses.

=== Affirmative vs. negating defense ===
An affirmative defense is different from a "negating defense". A negating defense is one which tends to disprove an element of the plaintiff's or prosecutor's case. An example might be a mistake of fact claim in a prosecution for intentional drug possession, where the defendant asserts that he or she mistakenly believed that the object possessed was an innocent substance. Because this defense simply shows that an element of the offense (knowledge of the nature of the substance) is not present, the defendant does not have any burden of persuasion with regard to a negating defense. At most the defendant has the burden of producing sufficient evidence to raise the issue.

=== Fair use ===
In Campbell v. Acuff-Rose Music, Inc., the United States Supreme Court held that fair use was an affirmative defense to copyright infringement. This means that in litigation on copyright infringement, the defendant bears the burden of raising and proving that the use was fair and not an infringement.

However, fair use is not always an affirmative defense; the burden of persuasion may instead fall to the copyright owner in Digital Millennium Copyright Act (DMCA) infringement actions. In a case challenging a takedown notice issued under the DMCA, the Ninth Circuit held in Lenz v. Universal Music Corp. that the submitter of a DMCA takedown request (who would then be the plaintiff in any subsequent litigation) has the burden to consider fair use prior to submitting the takedown request. "Even if, as Universal urges, fair use is classified as an 'affirmative defense,' we hold—for the purposes of the DMCA—fair use is uniquely situated in copyright law so as to be treated differently than traditional affirmative defenses. We conclude that because 17 U.S.C. § 107 created a type of non-infringing use, fair use is "authorized by the law" and a copyright holder must consider the existence of fair use before sending a takedown notification under § 512(c)."

== Examples ==
- Civil law
  - accord and satisfaction
  - assumption of risk (when the plaintiff knowingly entered into a dangerous situation)
  - authority
  - consent
  - defense of property
  - estoppel
  - contract specification
  - contractual provision (when the defendant's liability for causing the plaintiff's injuries had been waived in the contract; however, these provisions are typically unconscionable in many situations.)
  - contributory negligence (when the plaintiff's actions contributed to his own injury)
  - fair use
  - laches (similar to statute of limitation)
  - legal release
  - repossession
  - statute of frauds
  - statute of limitations (too much time has elapsed between the tort and the complaint)
  - waiver
- Criminal law
  - insanity defense
  - necessity
  - duress
  - self defense
  - truth
  - public interest

== See also ==
- Reverse onus
- Entrapment
