= Runyan v. State =

1877 Indiana court case

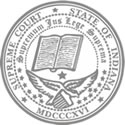
- Court: Supreme Court of Indiana
- Full case name: Runyan v. The State.
- Decided: May 1877
- Citation: 57 Ind. 80

Court membership
- Judges sitting: James Worden, Horace P. Biddle, Samuel E. Perkins, William Niblack, George Howk

Case opinions
- Decision by: Niblack

Keywords
- Duty to retreat; Homicide; Self-defense

Runyan v. State, 57 Ind. 80 (1877), was an Indiana court case that argued natural law and a distinct American Mind to reject a duty to retreat when claiming self-defense in a homicide case.

== Background ==
On election night for the 1876 presidential race, John Runyan was harassed for being a Democrat by Charles Presnall when they were both in New Castle, Indiana. Runyan shot and killed him with his revolver even though he could have retreated.

== Decision ==
The court implied it was un-American, writing of a referring to the distinct American mind, "the tendency of the American mind seems to be very strongly against" a duty to retreat. The court went further in saying that no statutory law could require a duty to retreat, because the right to stand one's ground is "founded on the law of nature; and is not, nor can it be, superseded by any law of society."
