= Defence of property =

Defense in criminal law

The defence of property is a common method of justification used by defendants who argue that they should not be held liable for any loss and injury that they have caused because they were acting to protect their property.

== English law ==
Generally, see self-defence in English law. In addition to the right of self-defence at common law, section 3 of the Criminal Law Act 1967 states that

A person may use such force as is reasonable in the circumstances in the prevention of crime or in arresting offenders or suspects.

Insofar as an attack on property is a crime, reasonable force may be used to prevent the crime or to arrest the offender, whether it be theft of a sum of money or the damage of an object. In many cases of robbery and burglary, the threat will be to both a person and property, and this combination can be a powerful defence. In AG's Reference (No 2 of 1983) (1984) 1 AER 988 Lane CJ. held that a defendant who manufactured ten petrol bombs to defend his shop during the Toxteth Riots could set up the defence of showing that he possessed an explosive substance "for a lawful purpose" if he could show he acted to protect himself or his family or property by means he believed reasonably necessary to meet the attack. In theory, the defence of property by itself cannot reasonably provide a justification for inflicting serious injury, but there are a number of cases approving considerable violence to arrest criminals threatening property.

Although R v Scully (1824) 171 ER 1213 held that it was not justifiable to shoot an intruder merely to arrest him, on the facts, "the life of the prisoner was threatened, and if he considered his life in actual danger, he was justified in shooting the deceased as he had done; but if, not considering his own life in danger, he rashly shot this man, who was only a trespasser, he would be guilty of manslaughter." See self-defence (Australia) for a comparative view on whether the use of excessive force causing death should give rise to a mitigatory defence and "Reform" below. In Mead and Belt's Case (1823) 68 ER 1006. Holroyd J. instructed a jury that violence could not be used against a civil trespasser, adding: "But, the making an attack upon a dwelling, and especially at night, the law regards as equivalent to an assault on a man's person; for a man's house is his castle and therefore, in the eye of the law, it is equivalent to an assault."

One recent case on using force against a burglar is Anthony Martin v R (2001) EWCA 2245, which resulted in the householder being convicted. As the law currently stands, a person in possession can use no more force than they reasonably believe necessary to remove a trespasser from the premises. Further, where the threat to the land or its possession is not immediate, and other measures could be taken that would make force unnecessary (e.g., calling the police or seeking remedies through the courts) the defence will normally be lost.

But in Chamberlain v Lindon (1998) 1 WLR 1252, Lindon demolished a wall to protect a right-of-way, honestly believing that it was a reasonable means of protecting his property (and, incidentally, avoiding litigation). It was held that it was not necessary to decide whether Lindon's action was justified as a matter of civil law. For the purpose of the criminal law, what mattered was whether Lindon believed that his actions were reasonable. Although this case is on the specific interpretation of the statutory defence under §5 Criminal Damage Act 1971, the fact that the defendant was not "out of time" after nine months of inaction is interesting. On a similar statutory defence, DPP v Bayer and Others (2004) 1 Cr. App. R. 493 dealt with defence of private property as a defence to aggravated trespass under section 68 of the Criminal Justice and Public Order Act 1994.

The court held that if defendants argued they had used reasonable force to defend property from actual or imminent damage that would constitute a criminal act, then the court had to consider whether, on the facts as the defendants honestly believed them to be, the force used was reasonable in all the circumstances.

== Reform ==
The defence of "private defence" or "protective force," when unlawful force is used or threatened against a person who may use proportionate force to defend persons or property, is distinguished from the line of authority concerned with a similar defence against trespassers. In the Law Commission's Report No. 218 Offences Against the Person and General Principles (1993) at pp. 106–110) these defences are set out (so far as they relate to defence of property) as follows:

27(i) The use of force by a person for any of the following purposes, if only such as is reasonable in the circumstances as he believes them to be, does not constitute an offence:

(c) to protect his property... from trespass;
(d) to protect property belonging to another from . . . damage caused by a criminal act or (with the authority of the other) from trespass...

29(i) For the purposes of s 27...

(a) a person uses force in relation to... property not only where he applies force to, but also where he causes an impact on,... that property;"

== See also ==
- Castle Doctrine
