= Killing of Khaled el-Atrash =

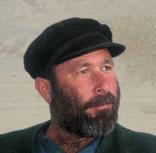
- Shai Dromi
- Date: 13 January 2007
- Location: Meitar, Israel
- Accused: Shai Dromi
- Charges: Manslaughter
- Verdict: Not guilty

On 13 January 2007, an Israeli farmer named Shai Dromi (born 1959, Hebrew: שי דרומי) shot and killed Khaled el-Atrash, an Israeli Arab Bedouin, after the latter entered his farm without permission.

== Background ==
On 15 July 2009, he was acquitted of manslaughter by an Israeli court, but convicted on charges of illegal possession of weapons. The rifle he had used belonged to his father and was not registered in Dromi's name.

Dromi's farm is near Meitar in southern Israel, an area plagued by property theft. In the months leading up to the incident, several other dogs had been killed and a tractor and horse stolen.

Dromi testified at his trial:

"I awoke at 3 AM to the barking of the guard dog that I acquired after my dogs were poisoned. Even though I was incredibly tired, I got out of bed and walked around the house. After I went back to bed, I again heard the dog barking irregularly. I went out with my weapon and didn't see anything. I kept walking around [the perimeter of my] sheep pen, and noticed large metal wire-cutters. I panicked. I realized there were men around me."

When police arrived, Dromi was administering first aid to the intruder, a Bedouin, Khaled el-Atrash, who later died. Dromi was arrested and imprisoned for a month and later restrained from returning to his farm afterwards requiring volunteers to continue its maintenance.

A public uproar drew much attention to Dromi's plight and a law was proposed by Member of Knesset Israel Katz and later passed by a large majority in the Knesset. The law, commonly known as the 'Dromi Law', considers opposition to intruders as self-defence and modified the criminal law to allow repelling intruders from a house or agricultural facility if they had a criminal intent. Section 99 defined any criminal intrusion into a house as life-threatening, and classified that one does not need to retreat but section 98 defined that the law does not apply if one caused the intruders to enter the house.

== See also ==
- Castle doctrine
- Death of Yoshihiro Hattori
