= Castle doctrine =

Legal concept

A castle doctrine, also known as a castle law or a defense of habitation law, is a legal doctrine that designates a person's abode or any legally occupied place (for example, an automobile or a home) as a place in which that person has protections and immunities permitting one, in certain circumstances, to use force (up to and including deadly force) to defend oneself against an intruder, free from legal prosecution for the consequences of the force used. The term is most commonly used in the United States, though many other countries invoke comparable principles in their laws.

Depending on the location, a person may have a duty to retreat to avoid violence if one can reasonably do so. Castle doctrines lessen the duty to retreat when an individual is assaulted within one's own home. Deadly force may either be justified, the burdens of production and proof for charges impeded, or an affirmative defense against criminal homicide applicable, in cases "when the actor reasonably fears imminent peril of death or serious bodily harm to him or herself or another." The castle doctrine is not a defined law that can be invoked, but a set of principles which may be incorporated in some form in many jurisdictions. Castle doctrines may not provide civil immunity, such as from wrongful death suits, which have a much lower burden of proof.

Justifiable homicide is a legally blameless killing in self-defense. A justifiable homicide that occurs within the home is distinct as a matter of law from castle doctrine, because the mere occurrence of trespassing—and occasionally a subjective requirement of fear—is sufficient to invoke the castle doctrine, under which the burden of proof of fact is much less challenging than that of justifying homicide in self-defense. However, the existence in a legal code of such a provision (of justifiable homicide in self-defense pertaining to one's domicile) does not imply the creation of a castle doctrine protecting the estate and exonerating any duty to retreat. The use of this legal principle in the United States has been controversial in relation to a number of cases in which it has been invoked, including the deaths of Japanese exchange student Yoshihiro Hattori and Scottish businessman Andrew de Vries.

== History ==
The legal concept of the inviolability of the home has been known in Western civilization since the age of the Roman Republic. In English common law the term is derived from the dictum that "an Englishman's home is his castle" (see Semayne's case). This concept was established as English law by the 17th century jurist Sir Edward Coke, in his The Institutes of the Laws of England, 1628:

For a man's house is his castle, et domus sua cuique est tutissimum refugium [and each man's home is his safest refuge].

The term 'castle' was defined in 1763 by Prime Minister William Pitt, 1st Earl of Chatham, "The poorest man may in his cottage bid defiance to all the forces of the crown. It may be frail – its roof may shake – the wind may blow through it – the storm may enter – the rain may enter – but the King of England cannot enter."

English common law came with colonists to the New World, where it has become known as the castle doctrine. The term has been used in England to imply a person's absolute right to exclude anyone from their home, although this has always had restrictions, such as bailiffs having increasing powers of entry since the late-20th century.

According to 18th-century Presbyterian minister and biblical commentator Matthew Henry, the prohibition of murder found in the Old Testament contains an exception for legitimate self-defense. A home defender who struck and killed a thief caught in the act of breaking in at night was not guilty of bloodshed. "If a thief is caught breaking in and is struck so that he dies, the thief owes no blood-debt to the home-defender; but if the thief lives, he owes a blood-debt to the home-defender and must make restitution."

=== In the early United States ===
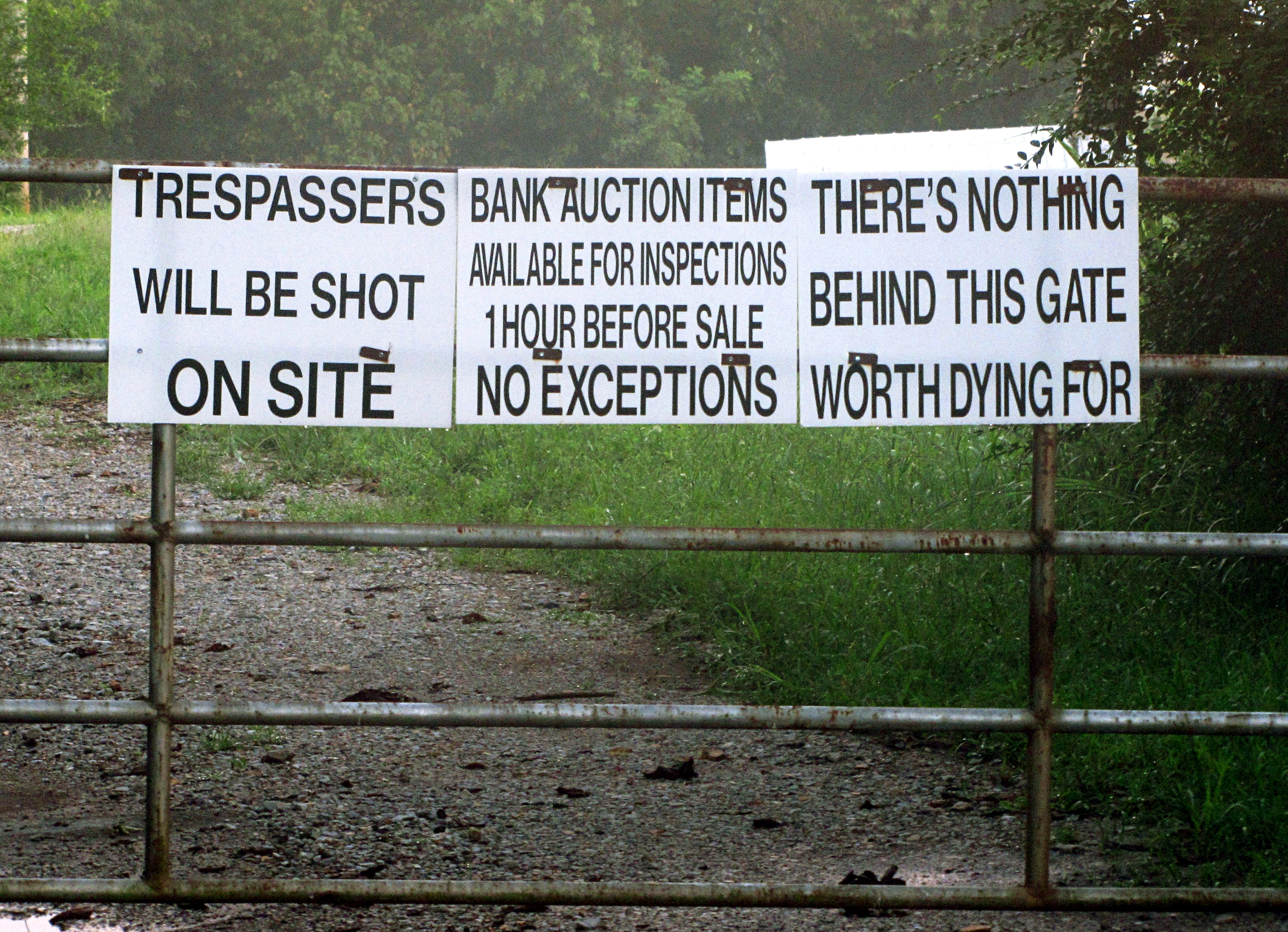
"Trespassers will be shot" sign

By the 18th century, many US state legal systems began by importing English common law such as Acts of Parliament of 2 Ed. III (Statute of Northampton), and 5 Rich. II (Forcible Entry Act 1381) in law since 1381—which imposed criminal sanctions intending to discourage the resort to self-help. This required a threatened party to retreat, whenever property was "involved" and resolve the issue by civil means.

Then as now, there were English politicians who were for or against the use of self-help over state-help. William Blackstone, in Book 4, Chapter 16 of his Commentaries on the Laws of England, proclaims that the laws "leave him (the inhabitant) the natural right of killing the aggressor (the burglar)" and goes on to generalize in the following words:

And the law of England has so particular and tender a regard to the immunity of a man's house, that it stiles it his castle, and will never suffer it to be violated with immunity: agreeing herein with the sentiments of ancient Rome, as expressed in the works of Tully; quid enim sanctius, quid omni religione munitius, quam domus uniuscuiusque civium? For this reason no doors can in general be broken open to execute any civil process; though, in criminal causes, the public safety supersedes the private. Hence also in part arises the animadversion of the law upon eaves-droppers, nuisancers, and incendiaries: and to this principle it must be assigned, that a man may assemble people together lawfully without danger of raising a riot, rout, or unlawful assembly, in order to protect and defend his house; which he is not permitted to do in any other case.

— William Blackstone, Commentaries on the Laws of England

Not only was the doctrine considered to justify defense against neighbors and criminals, but any of the Crown's agents who attempted to enter without a proper warrant as well. Prohibitions of the Fourth Amendment to the United States Constitution share a common background with current castle doctrine laws.

In 1841, The Preemption Act was passed to "appropriate the proceeds of the sales of public lands... and to grant 'pre-emption rights' to individuals" who were already living on federal lands (commonly referred to as "squatters"). During this same period, claim clubs sprung up all over the US advocating vigilance and the castle doctrine. This was in concurrence with the culture of manifest destiny which led to westward expansion and the American Indian Wars, the last of which ended by the 1920s.

=== On the American frontier ===
On the American frontier, the doctrine of no duty to retreat extended outside a residence. It asserted that a man in an altercation that he did not provoke was not obliged to flee from his attacker, but was free to stand his ground and defend himself. A state Supreme Court justice wrote in 1877,

Indeed, the tendency of the American mind seems to be very strongly against the enforcement of any rule which requires a person to flee when assailed.

American West historian Richard M. Brown wrote that under the circumstances, for a man in the American West to flee under such circumstances would be cowardly and un-American. Legendary dentist and gambler Doc Holliday successfully used this defense when he shot Billy Allen as he entered a saloon. Holliday owed Allen $5 (equivalent to $180 in 2025) which Allen wanted paid and had threatened Holliday. Although Allen was unarmed at the time, Holliday had received reports that Allen had been armed and looking for him earlier in the day. During the subsequent trial, Holliday asserted he was within his rights and the jury agreed. He was acquitted on March 28, 1885.

=== In Ancient China ===
In Ancient China, various versions of the castle doctrine existed. According to Han dynasty legal scholar Zheng Zhong, the doctrine extends protection onto rooms and other (including very rudimentary) place of dwelling, vehicles (such as carts), and ships: "It is not guilty to immediately assault and kill someone who, without cause, enters another's room or place of dwelling, vehicle, or ship, and with the intention of committing a crime." (Chinese: 若今時無故入人室宅廬舍，上人車船，牽引人欲犯法者，其時格殺之，無罪) During the Qin dynasty, the laws further extend castle doctrine protection against intrusion by the police or officials during the night. According to the Laws Governing Arrests (捕律): "It is forbidden for the police to enter other's room or place of dwelling during the night for the purpose of conducting an arrest, if the police violate this law, and is injured by (those in) the room, the police shall be treated as someone who enters another's room without cause" (捕律：禁吏毋夜入人廬舍捕人。犯者，其室毆傷之，以毋故入人室律從事). In the later Han dynasty, the most extreme interpretation of the doctrine was enacted, making it legal for those in a dwelling to assault and kill anyone, including the police and other officials, who enters a house during the night, regardless of cause.

Later dynasties such as the Tang, Ming, and Qing retained the doctrine but only during the night, and extending protection only for the owner of the dwelling: making it legal for the owner of a house to assault and kill trespassers at night without being guilty of crime, and without being charged or the need to argue one's case before a court. For example, the Tang Code states that "If someone enters someone else's house without reason at night, they will be lashed with forty strokes. If the homeowner kills the intruder immediately, there will be no charges (諸夜無故入人家者，笞四十。主人登時殺者，勿論). The Great Ming Code (大明律) states "Anyone who enters someone else's house at night without reason will be punished with eighty strokes of the cane. If the homeowner kills the intruder immediately, there will be no charges" (凡夜無故入人家內者，杖八十。主家登時殺死者，勿論).

The Chinese version of the castle doctrine is most likely a reflection of contemporary popular attitude, articulated in numerous historical poems and literature, that anyone who enters a civil dwelling at night is presumed to be either a rapist or a thief/robber (夜入民宅，非奸即盜).

=== Current position ===
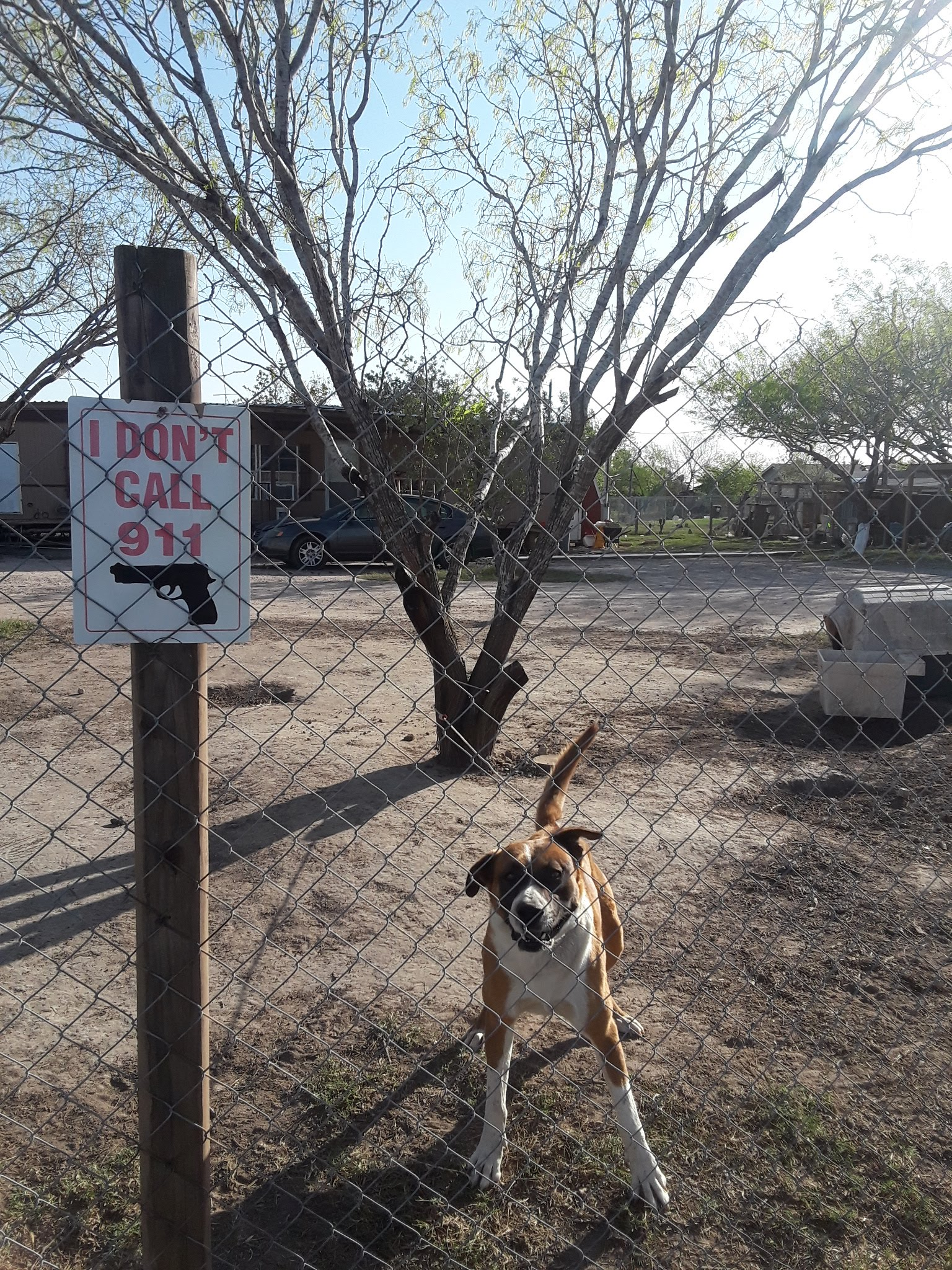
"I don't call 911 (with a pistol image)" sign in Texas

Today, the penal and civil forcible-entry laws of most American states forbid the use of force in the recovery of possession of land. At most the Castle Doctrine is an affirmative defense for individuals inevitably charged with criminal homicide, not a permission or pretext to commit homicide—which is generally unlawful. A minority of states permit individuals who have the right of immediate possession of land to use reasonable force to regain possession of that land, with Texas being the only state to allow the use of deadly force to regain possession of land or property.

The term "make my day law" came to be used in the United States in 1985 when Colorado passed a law that shielded people from any criminal or civil liability for using force against a home invader, including deadly force. (The law's nickname is a reference to the line "Go ahead, make my day" (meaning “do something so I have an excuse to kill you”) uttered by actor Clint Eastwood's character "Dirty Harry" Callahan in the 1983 police film Sudden Impact.)

== Conditions of use ==
Each jurisdiction incorporates the castle doctrine into its laws in different ways. The circumstance in which it may be invoked include the premises covered (abode only, or other places too), the degree of retreat or non-deadly resistance required before deadly force can be used, etc. Typical conditions that apply to some castle doctrine laws include:

- An intruder must be making (or have made) an attempt to unlawfully or forcibly enter an occupied residence, business, or vehicle.
- The intruder must be acting unlawfully (the castle doctrine does not allow a right to use force against officers of the law, acting in the course of their legal duties).
- The occupant(s) of the home must reasonably believe the intruder intends to inflict serious bodily harm or death upon an occupant of the home. Some states apply the Castle Doctrine if the occupant(s) of the home reasonably believe the intruder intends to commit a lesser felony such as arson or burglary.
- In Connecticut, the occupant(s) of the home must not have provoked or instigated an intrusion; or, provoked/instigated an intruder's threat or use of deadly force. In all cases, the occupant(s) of the home: must be there legally; must not be fugitives from the law themselves, or aiding/abetting other fugitives; and must not use force upon an officer of the law performing a legal duty.

In Colorado, the make-my-day statute provides the occupant with immunity from prosecution only for force used against a person who has made an unlawful entry into the dwelling; not against a person who remains unlawfully in the dwelling.

=== Immunity from civil lawsuit ===
In addition to providing a valid defense in criminal law, many laws implementing the castle doctrine, particularly those with a "stand-your-ground clause", also have a clause which provides immunity from any civil lawsuits filed on behalf of the assailant (for damages/injuries resulting from the force used to stop them). Without this clause, an assailant could sue for medical bills, property damage, disability, and pain and suffering as a result of the injuries inflicted by the defender; or, if the force results in the assailant's death, their next-of-kin or estate could launch a wrongful death suit. Even if successfully rebutted, the defendant (the homeowner/defender) would still have to pay high legal costs leading up to the suit's dismissal. Without criminal/civil immunity, such civil action could be used as revenge against a lawfully acting defender (who was, originally, the assailant's victim).

Use of force in self-defense which causes damage or injuries to other, non-criminally-acting parties, may not be shielded from criminal or civil prosecution, however.

=== Duty to retreat ===
In US jurisdictions where the castle doctrine applies, there is no duty to retreat before deadly force is used against an intruder by a person in their home or, in some jurisdictions, just simply where the person can legally be.

=== Stand-your-ground ===
Most states in the United States have stand-your-ground laws where individuals can use deadly force in self-defense in any location one is legally allowed to be without first attempting to retreat.

=== Culpability of intruder ===
In Colorado, the make-my-day statute "was not intended to justify use of physical force against persons who enter a dwelling accidentally or in good faith." In other words, "the unlawful entry element requires a culpable mental state of 'knowingly' on the part of the intruder."

== State-by-state positions in the United States ==
A list of states and their most applicable body of law to justifying homicide in protection of the abode is listed below. Because not all states truly invoke castle doctrine, justifiable homicide in defense of life—which is nearly universal in adoption, but with narrower application—is often what is invoked as a pretext to protect the home. However, the mere fact that one is trespassing is an inappropriate or inadequate defense per se to justifying homicide in many states.

=== States incorporating castle doctrine principles ===
The castle doctrine in its traditional absolute and extrajudicial form is antiquated in most states. However, its vestige saliently remains as a set of principles which are incorporated to a variegated extent through both statutory and case law. It is commonly manifested as an affirmative defense to criminal homicide that occurred within a home; in some states though it slightly enhances the conditions for justifiable homicide in self-defense by laying down no duty to retreat or avert a violent encounter, or by even granting a blanket rebuttable presumption of required killing in defense of life. Where principles are statutized in a penal code, a homicide may be excused criminally, but be a wrongful death civilly. In a strict sense, simple justifiable homicide in self-defense which happens to occur inside one's home is actually distinct as a matter of law from castle doctrine's no duty to retreat in defense of one's domicile. Self-defense protects life while castle doctrine defends estate. While most American states forbid the use of force in the recovery of possession of land, a minority of jurisdictions do invoke pure castle doctrine which unconditionally authorizes violent self-help in protection of one's domicile.

State	Law	Notes
Alabama	§ 13A-3-23	"Use of force in defense of a person. (a) A person is justified in using physical force upon another person in order to defend himself or herself or a third person from what he or she reasonably believes to be the use or imminent use of unlawful physical force by that other person, and he or she may use a degree of force which he or she reasonably believes to be necessary for the purpose. A person may use deadly physical force, and is legally presumed to be justified in using deadly physical force in self-defense or the defense of another person pursuant to subdivision (4), if the person reasonably believes that another person is: (1) Using or about to use unlawful deadly physical force. (2) Using or about to use physical force against an occupant of a dwelling while committing or attempting to commit a burglary of such dwelling. (3) Committing or about to commit a kidnapping in any degree, assault in the first or second degree, burglary in any degree, robbery in any degree, forcible rape, or forcible sodomy. (4) In the process of unlawfully and forcefully entering, or has unlawfully and forcefully entered, a dwelling, residence, or occupied vehicle, or federally licensed nuclear power facility, or is in the process of sabotaging or attempting to sabotage a federally licensed nuclear power facility, or is attempting to remove, or has forcefully removed, a person against their will from any dwelling, residence, or occupied vehicle when the person has a legal right to be there, and provided that the person using the deadly physical force knows or has reason to believe that an unlawful and forcible entry or unlawful and forcible act is occurring...."
Alaska	§ 11.81.335	"...a person who is justified in using nondeadly force in self-defense under AS 11.81.330 may use deadly force in self-defense upon another person when and to the extent the person reasonably believes the use of deadly force is necessary for self-defense against death, serious physical injury, kidnapping, sexual assault, robbery in any degree... there is no duty to leave the area if the person is(1) on premises that the person owns or leases.
Arizona	§ 13-418	"A. Notwithstanding any other provision of this chapter, a person is justified in threatening to use or using physical force or deadly physical force against another person if the person reasonably believes himself or another person to be in imminent peril of death or serious physical injury and the person against whom the physical force or deadly physical force is threatened or used was in the process of unlawfully or forcefully entering, or had unlawfully or forcefully entered, a residential structure or occupied vehicle, or had removed or was attempting to remove another person against the other person's will from the residential structure or occupied vehicle. B. A person has no duty to retreat before threatening or using physical force or deadly physical force pursuant to this section.
Arkansas		The General Assembly finds that the current laws regarding self-defense and the use of deadly physical force in self-defense or in defense of another person are adequate in that the law explicitly does not require a person to retreat from certain life-threatening confrontations if a person cannot do so safely. However, the General Assembly finds that there is currently not enough protection from civil liability for a person who rightfully uses deadly physical force in self-defense or in defense of another person. The General Assembly finds that a more robust civil immunity statute is necessary to protect a person from civil damages stemming from an incident when he or she lawfully uses deadly physical force in self-defense or in defense of another person.
California	§ Penal Code 198.5 Daluiso v. Boone, 71 Cal.2d 484	"Any person using force intended or likely to cause death or great bodily injury within his or her residence shall be presumed to have held a reasonable fear of imminent peril of death or great bodily injury to self, family, or a member of the household when that force is used against another person, not a member of the family or household, who unlawfully and forcibly enters or has unlawfully and forcibly entered the residence and the person using the force knew or had reason to believe that an unlawful and forcible entry occurred." "It is urged that the owner of real estate has a right to enter upon and enjoy his own property. Undoubtedly, if he can do so without a forcible disturbance of the possession of another; but the peace and good order of society require that he shall not be permitted to enter against the will of the occupant, and hence the common law right to use all necessary force has been taken away. He may be wrongfully kept out of possession, but he cannot be permitted to take the law into his own hands and redress his own wrongs. The remedy must be sought through those peaceful agencies which a civilized community provides for all its members."
Colorado	§ 18-1-704	"...any occupant of a dwelling is justified in using any degree of physical force, including deadly physical force, against another person when that other person has made an unlawful entry into the dwelling, and when the occupant has a reasonable belief that such other person has committed a crime in the dwelling in addition to the uninvited entry, or is committing or intends to commit a crime against a person or property in addition to the uninvited entry, and when the occupant reasonably believes that such other person might use any physical force, no matter how slight, against any occupant."
Connecticut	Sec. 53a-20	A person in possession or control of premises, or a person who is licensed or privileged to be in or upon such premises, is justified in using reasonable physical force upon another person when and to the extent that he reasonably believes such to be necessary to prevent or terminate the commission or attempted commission of a criminal trespass by such other person in or upon such premises; but he may use deadly physical force under such circumstances only (1) in defense of a person as prescribed in section 53a-19, or (2) when he reasonably believes such to be necessary to prevent an attempt by the trespasser to commit arson or any crime of violence, or (3) to the extent that he reasonably believes such to be necessary to prevent or terminate an unlawful entry by force into his dwelling as defined in section 53a-100, or place of work, and for the sole purpose of such prevention or termination.
Delaware		No duty to retreat in home. Duty to retreat in public.
Florida	776.013	Home protection; use or threatened use of deadly force; presumption of fear of death or great bodily harm.
Georgia	§ 16-3-23.1	No duty to retreat prior to use of force in self-defense.
Hawaii	§ 703-304	No duty to retreat from dwelling/workplace.
Idaho	18-4009	a justifiable homicide law in self-defense from violence—must prove intruder's intent thereof
Illinois	720 ILCS 5	Use of deadly force justified. Specific legislation prevents filing claim against defender of dwelling. Illinois has no requirement of retreat.
Indiana	IC 35-41-3-2	No duty to retreat from dwelling, curtilage, or occupied motor vehicle. In 2012, an amendment was made to the code to address the issue of force against a public servant. The amendment states: "A person is not justified in using deadly force against a public servant whom the person knows or reasonably should know is a public servant unless: (1) the person reasonably believes that the public servant is: (A) acting unlawfully; or (B) not engaged in the execution of the public servant's official duties; and (2) the force is reasonably necessary to prevent serious bodily injury to the person or a third person."
Iowa	704.1	No duty to retreat from home or place of business in defense of self or a "third party".
Kansas	K.S.A. 21-5220 through 21-5231	21-5222 Use of force in defense of a person. (a) A person is justified in the use of force against another when and to the extent it appears to such person and such person reasonably believes that such use of force is necessary to defend such person or a third person against such other's imminent use of unlawful force. (b) A person is justified in the use of deadly force under circumstances described in subsection (a) if such person reasonably believes that such use of deadly force is necessary to prevent imminent death or great bodily harm to such person or a third person. (c) Nothing in this section shall require a person to retreat if such person is using force to protect such person or a third person. 21-5223. Use of force in defense of dwelling. (a) A person is justified in the use of force against another when and to the extent that it appears to such person and such person reasonably believes that such use of force is necessary to prevent or terminate such other's unlawful entry into or attack upon such person's dwelling, place of work or occupied vehicle. (b) A person is justified in the use of deadly force to prevent or terminate unlawful entry into or attack upon any dwelling, place of work or occupied vehicle if such person reasonably believes that such use of deadly force is necessary to prevent imminent death or great bodily harm to such person or another. (c) Nothing in this section shall require a person to retreat if such person is using force to protect such person's dwelling, place of work or occupied vehicle.
Kentucky	KRS 503.055	No duty to retreat from dwelling, residence or occupied vehicle.
Louisiana	LA RS 14:20	(4)(a) When committed by a person lawfully inside a dwelling, a place of business, or a motor vehicle as defined in R.S. 32:1(40), against a person who is attempting to make an unlawful entry into the dwelling, place of business, or motor vehicle, or who has made an unlawful entry into the dwelling, place of business, or motor vehicle, and the person committing the homicide reasonably believes that the use of deadly force is necessary to prevent the entry or to compel the intruder to leave the premises or motor vehicle.
Maine	§ 104	Deadly force justified to terminate criminal trespass AND another crime within home, or to stop unlawful and imminent use of deadly force, or to effect a citizen's arrest against deadly force; duty to retreat not specifically removed
Maryland		See Maryland self-defense. Case-law, not statute, incorporates the common law castle-doctrine into Maryland self-defense law. Invitees or guests may have duty to retreat based on mixed case law.
Massachusetts	278-8a	Section 8A. In the prosecution of a person who is an occupant of a dwelling charged with killing or injuring one who was unlawfully in said dwelling, it shall be a defense that the occupant was in his dwelling at the time of the offense and that he acted in the reasonable belief that the person unlawfully in said dwelling was about to inflict great bodily injury or death upon said occupant or upon another person lawfully in said dwelling, and that said occupant used reasonable means to defend himself or such other person lawfully in said dwelling. There shall be no duty on said occupant to retreat from such person unlawfully in said dwelling.
Michigan	768.21c	768.21c Use of deadly force by individual in own dwelling; "dwelling" defined. (1) In cases in which section 2 of the self-defense act does not apply, the common law of this state applies except that the duty to retreat before using deadly force is not required if an individual is in their own dwelling or within the curtilage of that dwelling. (2) As used in this section, "dwelling" means a structure or shelter that is used permanently or temporarily as a place of abode, including an appurtenant structure attached to that structure or shelter.
Minnesota	609.065	No duty to retreat before using deadly force to prevent a felony in one's place of abode; no duty to retreat before using deadly force in self-defense in one's place of abode This isn't as clear as it appears, however. There are four cases in Minnesota where duty of retreat was upheld.
Mississippi	MS Code 97-3-15	(3) A person who uses defensive force shall be presumed to have reasonably feared imminent death or great bodily harm, or the commission of a felony upon him or another or upon his dwelling, or against a vehicle which he was occupying, or against his business or place of employment or the immediate premises of such business or place of employment, if the person against whom the defensive force was used, was in the process of unlawfully and forcibly entering, or had unlawfully and forcibly entered, a dwelling, occupied vehicle, business, place of employment or the immediate premises thereof or if that person had unlawfully removed or was attempting to unlawfully remove another against the other person's will from that dwelling, occupied vehicle, business, place of employment or the immediate premises thereof and the person who used defensive force knew or had reason to believe that the forcible entry or unlawful and forcible act was occurring or had occurred. This presumption shall not apply if the person against whom defensive force was used has a right to be in or is a lawful resident or owner of the dwelling, vehicle, business, place of employment or the immediate premises thereof or is the lawful resident or owner of the dwelling, vehicle, business, place of employment or the immediate premises thereof or if the person who uses defensive force is engaged in unlawful activity or if the person is a law enforcement officer engaged in the performance of his official duties; (4) A person who is not the initial aggressor and is not engaged in unlawful activity shall have no duty to retreat before using deadly force under subsection (1) (e) or (f) of this section if the person is in a place where the person has a right to be, and no finder of fact shall be permitted to consider the person's failure to retreat as evidence that the person's use of force was unnecessary, excessive or unreasonable. (5) (a) The presumptions contained in subsection (3) of this section shall apply in civil cases in which self-defense or defense of another is claimed as a defense.
Missouri	563.031	Extends to any building, inhabitable structure, or conveyance of any kind, whether the building, inhabitable structure, or conveyance is temporary or permanent, mobile or immobile (e.g., a camper, RV or mobile home), which has a roof over it, including a tent, and is designed to be occupied by people lodging therein at night, whether the person is residing there temporarily, permanently or visiting (e.g., a hotel or motel), and any vehicle. The defense against civil suits is absolute and includes the award of attorney's fees, court costs, and all reasonable expenses incurred by the defendant in defense of any civil action brought by a plaintiff.
Montana	§45-3-103	45–3–103. Use of force in defense of occupied structure. (1) A person is justified in the use of force or threat to use force against another when and to the extent that the person reasonably believes that the use of force is necessary to prevent or terminate the other person's unlawful entry into or attack upon an occupied structure. (2) A person justified in the use of force pursuant to subsection (1) is justified in the use of force likely to cause death or serious bodily harm only if: (a) the entry is made or attempted and the person reasonably believes that the force is necessary to prevent an assault upon the person or another then in the occupied structure; or (b) the person reasonably believes that the force is necessary to prevent the commission of a forcible felony in the occupied structure.
Nebraska		No duty to retreat in home. Duty to retreat in public.
Nevada	200.120	200.120.: 1. Justifiable homicide is the killing of a human being in necessary self-defense, or in defense of habitation, property or person, against one who manifestly intends or endeavors, by violence or surprise, to commit a felony, or against any person or persons who manifestly intend and endeavor, in a violent, riotous, tumultuous or surreptitious manner, to enter the habitation of another for the purpose of assaulting or offering personal violence to any person dwelling or being therein.; 2. A person is not required to retreat before using deadly force as provided in subsection 1 if the person: (a) Is not the original aggressor; (b) Has a right to be present at the location where deadly force is used; and (c) Is not actively engaged in conduct in furtherance of criminal activity at the time deadly force is used.
New Hampshire		Not required to retreat if he or she is within their dwelling, its curtilage, or anywhere he or she has a right to be, and was not the initial aggressor. An individual may respond to a threat of serious bodily injury or death by displaying a firearm or other method of self-defense. Deadly force is justified if the aggressor is about to use unlawful, deadly force, is likely to use any unlawful force against a person present while committing or attempting to commit a burglary, is committing or about to commit kidnapping or a forcible sex offense, or is likely to use any unlawful force in the commission of a felony against the individual within their dwelling or its curtilage.
New Jersey		Retreat required if actor knows he can avoid necessity of deadly force in complete safety, etc. except not obliged to retreat from dwelling, unless the initial aggressor
New York	PL § 35.15	Use of non-deadly force or deadly physical force explicitly allowed to prevent or terminate a burglary or arson upon one's dwelling or defense of self in one's dwelling assuming the homeowner is not the initial aggressor.
North Carolina	§ 14‑51.3	Use of force in defense of person; relief from criminal or civil liability. (a) A person is justified in using force, except deadly force, against another when and to the extent that the person reasonably believes that the conduct is necessary to defend himself or herself or another against the other's imminent use of unlawful force. However, a person is justified in the use of deadly force and does not have a duty to retreat in any place he or she has the lawful right to be if either of the following applies: (1) He or she reasonably believes that such force is necessary to prevent imminent death or great bodily harm to himself or herself or another. (2) Under the circumstances permitted pursuant to G.S. 14‑51.2. (b) A person who uses force as permitted by this section is justified in using such force and is immune from civil or criminal liability for the use of such force, unless the person against whom force was used is a law enforcement officer or bail bondsman who was lawfully acting in the performance of their official duties and the officer or bail bondsman identified himself or herself in accordance with any applicable law or the person using force knew or reasonably should have known that the person was a law enforcement officer or bail bondsman in the lawful performance of their official duties. (2011‑268, s. 1.) (Note: In practice North Carolina automatically assumes the use of any level of force is justified unless there is clear, unambiguous proof that the force used was not justified.)
North Dakota	12.1-05-07.	When deadly force is used in lawful self-defense, or in lawful defense of others, if such force is necessary to protect the actor or anyone else against death, serious bodily injury, or the commission of a felony involving violence, An individual is not required to retreat within or from that individual's dwelling or place of work or from an occupied motor home or travel trailer, unless the individual was the original aggressor or is assailed by another individual who the individual knows also dwells or works there or who is lawfully in the motor home or travel trailer. Also, deadly force is permitted in defense of property when used by an individual in possession or control of a dwelling, place of work, or an occupied motor home or travel trailer, or by an individual who is licensed or privileged to be there, if the force is necessary to prevent commission of arson, burglary, robbery, or a felony involving violence upon or in the dwelling, place of work, or occupied motor home or travel trailer, and the use of force other than deadly force for these purposes would expose any individual to substantial danger of serious bodily injury.
Ohio	133 SB 175	A trier of fact shall not consider the possibility of retreat as a factor in determining whether or not a person who used force in self-defense, defense of another, or defense of that person's residence reasonably believed that the force was necessary to prevent injury, loss, or risk to life or safety. Section 2901.09
Oregon	ORS	Use of force justifiable in a range of scenarios without a duty to retreat specified. Oregon Supreme Court affirmed in State of Oregon v. Sandoval that the law "sets out a specific set of circumstances that justify a person's use of deadly force (that the person reasonably believes that another person is using or about to use deadly force against him or her) and does not interpose any additional requirement (including a requirement that there be no means of escape)."
Pennsylvania	18 Pa.C.S. Chapter 5 § 505	The most recent version of Pennsylvania's Castle Doctrine legislation was signed into law in June 2011. The law extends the right to self-defense up to and including deadly force in a victim's dwelling (now including any attached porch, deck or patio), occupied vehicle, or any other dwelling or vehicle that the victim legally occupies. A place of work is included in the "castle" provision under certain circumstances. Use of deadly force is justifiable if the "castle" area in the event that an assailant is "unlawfully and forcefully entering" or has entered the "castle" area. Deadly force is also justifiable, subject to certain provisions, if a person that legally enters the "castle" goes on to unlawfully attack a victim (when the victim is reasonably in fear of his/her life) or if the attacker attempts to kidnap anyone who legally occupies the "castle". The victim must be in "legal possession" of a firearm or other weapon to be justified in the use of that weapon. Use of deadly force to protect an innocent third person is generally allowed in circumstances where the provisions for justifiable self-defense are met. Victims who justifiably use force to defend themselves under the provisions of the law are immune from civil liability for any injuries sustained by the attacker during the incident. The new legislation also contains a stand your ground provision when outside the "castle". Outside "castle areas" there is no duty to retreat if confronted with a weapon.
Rhode Island	§ 11-8-8	In the event that any person shall die or shall sustain a personal injury in any way or for any cause while in the commission of any criminal offense enumerated in §§ 11-8-2 – 11–8–6, it shall be rebuttably presumed as a matter of law in any civil or criminal proceeding that the owner, tenant, or occupier of the place where the offense was committed acted by reasonable means in self-defense and in the reasonable belief that the person engaged in the criminal offense was about to inflict great bodily harm or death upon that person or any other individual lawfully in the place where the criminal offense was committed. There shall be no duty on the part of an owner, tenant, or occupier to retreat from any person engaged in the commission of any criminal offense enumerated in §§ 11-8-2 – 11–8–6.
South Carolina		SECTION 16–11–440. Presumption of reasonable fear of imminent peril when using deadly force against another unlawfully entering residence, occupied vehicle or place of business. (A) A person is presumed to have a reasonable fear of imminent peril of death or great bodily injury to himself or another person when using deadly force that is intended or likely to cause death or great bodily injury to another person if the person: (1) against whom the deadly force is used is in the process of unlawfully and forcefully entering, or has unlawfully and forcibly entered a dwelling, residence, or occupied vehicle, or if he removes or is attempting to remove another person against his will from the dwelling, residence, or occupied vehicle; and (2) who uses deadly force knows or has reason to believe that an unlawful and forcible entry or unlawful and forcible act is occurring or has occurred. (B) The presumption provided in subsection (A) does not apply if the person: (1) against whom the deadly force is used has the right to be in or is a lawful resident of the dwelling, residence, or occupied vehicle including, but not limited to, an owner, lessee, or titleholder; or (2) sought to be removed is a child or grandchild, or is otherwise in the lawful custody or under the lawful guardianship, of the person against whom the deadly force is used; or (3) who uses deadly force is engaged in an unlawful activity or is using the dwelling, residence, or occupied vehicle to further an unlawful activity; or (4) against whom the deadly force is used is a law enforcement officer who enters or attempts to enter a dwelling, residence, or occupied vehicle in the performance of his official duties, and he identifies himself in accordance with applicable law or the person using force knows or reasonably should have known that the person entering or attempting to enter is a law enforcement officer. (C) A person who is not engaged in an unlawful activity and who is attacked in another place where he has a right to be, including, but not limited to, his place of business, has no duty to retreat and has the right to stand his ground and meet force with force, including deadly force, if he reasonably believes it is necessary to prevent death or great bodily injury to himself or another person or to prevent the commission of a violent crime as defined in Section 16-1-60. (D) A person who unlawfully and by force enters or attempts to enter a person's dwelling, residence, or occupied vehicle is presumed to be doing so with the intent to commit an unlawful act involving force or a violent crime as defined in Section 16-1-60. (E) A person who by force enters or attempts to enter a dwelling, residence, or occupied vehicle in violation of an order of protection, restraining order, or condition of bond is presumed to be doing so with the intent to commit an unlawful act regardless of whether the person is a resident of the dwelling, residence, or occupied vehicle including, but not limited to, an owner, lessee, or titleholder. HISTORY: 2006 Act No. 379, Section 1, eff June 9, 2006.
Tennessee	T.C.A. 39.11.611 Self Defense	a) As used in this section, unless the context otherwise requires: (1) "Business" means a commercial enterprise or establishment owned by a person as all or part of the person's livelihood or is under the owner's control or who is an employee or agent of the owner with responsibility for protecting persons and property and shall include the interior and exterior premises of the business; (2) "Category I nuclear facility" means a facility that possesses a formula quantity of strategic special nuclear material, as defined and licensed by the United States nuclear regulatory commission, and that must comply with the requirements of 10 CFR Part 73; (3) "Curtilage" means the area surrounding a dwelling that is necessary, convenient and habitually used for family purposes and for those activities associated with the sanctity of a person's home; (4) "Deadly force" means the use of force intended or likely to cause death or serious bodily injury; (5) "Dwelling" means a building or conveyance of any kind, including any attached porch, whether the building or conveyance is temporary or permanent, mobile or immobile, that has a roof over it, including a tent, and is designed for or capable of use by people; (6) "Nuclear power reactor facility" means a reactor designed to produce heat for electric generation, for producing radiation or fissionable materials, or for reactor component testing, and does not include a reactor used for research purposes; (7) "Nuclear security officer" means a person who meets the requirements of 10 CFR Part 73, Appendix B, who is an employee or an employee of a contractor of the owner of a category I nuclear facility or nuclear power reactor facility, and who has been appointed or designated by the owner of a category I nuclear facility or nuclear power reactor facility to provide security for the facility; (8) "Residence" means a dwelling in which a person resides, either temporarily or permanently, or is visiting as an invited guest, or any dwelling, building or other appurtenance within the curtilage of the residence; and (9) "Vehicle" means any motorized vehicle that is self-propelled and designed for use on public highways to transport people or property. (b) (1) Notwithstanding § 39-17-1322, a person who is not engaged in unlawful activity and is in a place where the person has a right to be has no duty to retreat before threatening or using force against another person when and to the degree the person reasonably believes the force is immediately necessary to protect against the other's use or attempted use of unlawful force. (2) Notwithstanding § 39-17-1322, a person who is not engaged in unlawful activity and is in a place where the person has a right to be has no duty to retreat before threatening or using force intended or likely to cause death or serious bodily injury, if: (A) The person has a reasonable belief that there is an imminent danger of death or serious bodily injury; (B) The danger creating the belief of imminent death or serious bodily injury is real, or honestly believed to be real at the time; and (C) The belief of danger is founded upon reasonable grounds. (c) Any person using force intended or likely to cause death or serious bodily injury within a residence, business, dwelling or vehicle is presumed to have held a reasonable belief of imminent death or serious bodily injury to self, family, a member of the household or a person visiting as an invited guest, when that force is used against another person, who unlawfully and forcibly enters or has unlawfully and forcibly entered the residence, business, dwelling or vehicle, and the person using defensive force knew or had reason to believe that an unlawful and forcible entry occurred. (d) The presumption established in subsection (c) shall not apply, if: (1) The person against whom the force is used has the right to be in or is a lawful resident of the dwelling, business, residence, or vehicle, such as an owner, lessee, or titleholder; provided, that the person is not prohibited from entering the dwelling, business, residence, or occupied vehicle by an order of protection, injunction for protection from domestic abuse, or a court order of no contact against that person; (2) The person against whom the force is used is attempting to remove a person or persons who is a child or grandchild of, or is otherwise in the lawful custody or under the lawful guardianship of, the person against whom the defensive force is used; (3) Notwithstanding § 39-17-1322, the person using force is engaged in an unlawful activity or is using the dwelling, business, residence, or occupied vehicle to further an unlawful activity; or (4) The person against whom force is used is a law enforcement officer, as defined in § 39-11-106, who enters or attempts to enter a dwelling, business, residence, or vehicle in the performance of the officer's official duties, and the officer identified the officer in accordance with any applicable law, or the person using force knew or reasonably should have known that the person entering or attempting to enter was a law enforcement officer. (e) The threat or use of force against another is not justified: (1) If the person using force consented to the exact force used or attempted by the other individual; (2) If the person using force provoked the other individual's use or attempted use of unlawful force, unless: (A) The person using force abandons the encounter or clearly communicates to the other the intent to do so; and (B) The other person nevertheless continues or attempts to use unlawful force against the person; or (3) To resist a halt at a roadblock, arrest, search, or stop and frisk that the person using force knows is being made by a law enforcement officer, unless: (A) The law enforcement officer uses or attempts to use greater force than necessary to make the arrest, search, stop and frisk, or halt; and (B) The person using force reasonably believes that the force is immediately necessary to protect against the law enforcement officer's use or attempted use of greater force than necessary. (f) A nuclear security officer is authorized to use deadly force under the following circumstances: (1) Deadly force appears reasonably necessary to prevent or impede an act, or attempted act, of radiological sabotage at a category I nuclear facility or nuclear power reactor facility, including, but not limited to, situations where a person is attempting to, or has, unlawfully or forcefully entered a category I nuclear facility or nuclear power reactor facility, and where adversary tactics are employed to attempt an act of radiological sabotage, such as, but not limited to: (A) Use of firearms or small arms; (B) Use of explosive devices; (C) Use of incendiary devices; (D) Use of vehicle borne improvised explosive devices; (E) Use of water borne improvised explosive devices; (F) Breaching of barriers; and (G) Use of other adversary or terrorist tactics which could be employed to attempt an act of radiological sabotage; (2) Deadly force appears reasonably necessary to protect the nuclear security officer or another person if the nuclear security officer reasonably believes there is an imminent danger of death or serious bodily injury; (3) Deadly force appears reasonably necessary to prevent the imminent infliction or threatened infliction of death or serious bodily harm or the sabotage of an occupied facility by explosives; (4) Deadly force appears reasonably necessary to prevent the theft, sabotage, or unauthorized control of special nuclear material from a nuclear power reactor facility or of a nuclear weapon or nuclear explosive device or special nuclear material from a category I nuclear facility; or (5) Deadly force reasonably appears to be necessary to apprehend or prevent the escape of a person reasonably believed to: (A) Have committed an offense of the nature specified under this subsection (f); or (B) Be escaping by use of a weapon or explosive or who otherwise poses an imminent danger of death or serious bodily harm to nuclear security officers or others unless apprehended without delay.
Texas	Penal Code Sec. 9.32	(a) A person is justified in using deadly force against another: (1) if the actor would be justified in using force against the other under Section 9.31; and (2) when and to the degree the actor reasonably believes the deadly force is immediately necessary: (A) to protect the actor against the other's use or attempted use of unlawful deadly force; or (B) to prevent the other's imminent commission of aggravated kidnapping, murder, sexual assault, aggravated sexual assault, robbery, or aggravated robbery. (b) The actor's belief under Subsection (a)(2) that the deadly force was immediately necessary as described by that subdivision is presumed to be reasonable if the actor: (1) knew or had reason to believe that the person against whom the deadly force was used: (A) unlawfully and with force entered, or was attempting to enter unlawfully and with force, the actor's occupied habitation, vehicle, or place of business or employment; (B) unlawfully and with force removed, or was attempting to remove unlawfully and with force, the actor from the actor's habitation, vehicle, or place of business or employment; or (C) was committing or attempting to commit an offense described by Subsection (a)(2)(B); (2) did not provoke the person against whom the force was used; and (3) was not otherwise engaged in criminal activity, other than a Class C misdemeanor that is a violation of a law or ordinance regulating traffic at the time the force was used. (c) A person who has a right to be present at the location where the deadly force is used, who has not provoked the person against whom the deadly force is used, and who is not engaged in criminal activity at the time the deadly force is used is not required to retreat before using deadly force as described by this section. (d) For purposes of Subsection (a)(2), in determining whether an actor described by Subsection (c) reasonably believed that the use of deadly force was necessary, a finder of fact may not consider whether the actor failed to retreat.
Utah		76–2–405. Amended by Chapter 252, 1985 General Session. Force in defense of habitation. (1) A person is justified in using force against another when and to the extent that he reasonably believes that the force is necessary to prevent or terminate the other's unlawful entry into or attack upon his habitation; however, he is justified in the use of force which is intended or likely to cause death or serious bodily injury only if: (a) the entry is made or attempted in a violent and tumultuous manner, surreptitiously, or by stealth, and he reasonably believes that the entry is attempted or made for the purpose of assaulting or offering personal violence to any person, dwelling, or being in the habitation and he reasonably believes that the force is necessary to prevent the assault or offer of personal violence; or (b) he reasonably believes that the entry is made or attempted for the purpose of committing a felony in the habitation and that the force is necessary to prevent the commission of the felony. (2) The person using force or deadly force in defense of habitation is presumed for the purpose of both civil and criminal cases to have acted reasonably and had a reasonable fear of imminent peril of death or serious bodily injury if the entry or attempted entry is unlawful and is made or attempted by use of force, or in a violent and tumultuous manner, or surreptitiously or by stealth, or for the purpose of committing a felony.
Virginia		Virginia is one of at least 25 states allow that there is no duty to retreat an attacker in any place in which one is lawfully present. Self-defense laws in Virginia provide civil immunity under certain self-defense circumstances. Although not codified by statute, Virginia case law supports a version of the castle doctrine, providing that under certain circumstances, a person may use deadly force against someone entering his home.
West Virginia		§55-7-22. (a) A lawful occupant within a home or other place of residence is justified in using reasonable and proportionate force, including deadly force, against an intruder or attacker to prevent a forcible entry into the home or residence or to terminate the intruder's or attacker's unlawful entry if the occupant reasonably apprehends that the intruder or attacker may kill or inflict serious bodily harm upon the occupant or others in the home or residence or if the occupant reasonably believes that the intruder or attacker intends to commit a felony in the home or residence and the occupant reasonably believes deadly force is necessary. (b) A lawful occupant within a home or other place of residence does not have a duty to retreat from an intruder or attacker in the circumstances described in subsection (a) of this section.
Wisconsin		Assembly Bill 69, signed December 7, 2011; The civil immunity became Sec. 895.62, Wis.Stats. and the criminal immunity became Sec. 939.48, Wis.Stats.
Wyoming		

=== States with weak or no specific castle law ===
These states uphold castle doctrine in general, but may rely on case law instead of specific legislation, may enforce a duty to retreat, and may impose specific restrictions on the use of deadly force:

- District of Columbia
- Nebraska - a bill was introduced in January 2012 that allowed deadly force against a person who broke into a house or occupied vehicle or who tried to kidnap someone from a house or vehicle; however, the bill was revised to include only an affirmative defense from lawsuits pertaining to justifiable use of force.
- New Mexico - Limited Castle Doctrine for self-defense inside one's home established by court precedence in State v. Couch (1946). No civil immunity from potential lawsuits by the aggressor or surviving relatives. In 2011, two bills (House Bill 228 and Senate Bill 29) would have granted civil immunity to individuals who lawfully use lethal force in self-defense, both bills died in their respective chambers of the New Mexico Legislature.
- Vermont

=== Situation in U.S. territories ===
U.S. Territory	Statute	Notes
Guam		Bill 146 amends Guam law by allowing homeowners to use deadly force against home invaders. If their actions meet the provisions of the bill, homeowners would be immune from prosecution and civil lawsuits.
Puerto Rico	Art.25	Penal Code Article 25. - Legitimate Defense. A person does not incur criminal liability when defending his person, his home, his property or rights, or person, dwelling, property or rights of others when the person reasonably believes that imminent damage is to be expected, provided that there is a rational need for the means of impeding or repelling the damage, and it can be shown that there isn't sufficient evidence that the person exercising the defense provoked the aggressor, and that the means of exercising the defense did not exceed the means necessary to repel or avoid the damage. When self-defense is claimed to justify killing a human being, it is necessary to have founded grounds to believe that by killing the aggressor, the victim of the aggression or the person being defended from the aggressor was in imminent or immediate danger of death or serious bodily harm. To justify the defense of the abode, the circumstances must indicate an illegal entry or that the person in the dwelling had a reasonable belief that a crime will be committed. To justify the defense of property or rights, the circumstances must indicate an attack on them which results in a criminal offense or puts them in serious danger of imminent deterioration or loss. In April 2018, the law expanded castle doctrine protections. Stand your ground was passed in 2020.

== Outside the United States ==
=== Australia ===
Australian states have differing self-defense laws. Under South Australian law, the general defense appears in s15(1) Criminal Law Consolidation Act 1935 (SA) for defending a person's life, and s15A(1) for defending property, subject to a hybrid test, i.e. the defendant honestly believed the threat to be imminent and made an objectively reasonable and proportionate response to the circumstances as the accused subjectively perceived them.

In July 2003, South Australia's Rann government introduced laws allowing householders to use "whatever force they deem necessary" when confronted with a home invader. Householders who kill or injure a home invader escape prosecution provided they can prove they had a genuine belief that it was necessary to do so to protect themselves or their family. The law was strongly opposed by then-Director of Public Prosecutions Paul Rofe, QC, and lawyer Marie Shaw, who is now a District Court Judge.

In February 2019, Sydney man Bradley Soper was killed when he broke into the home of Francois Schwartz. After investigation, NSW Police detectives advised not to prosecute Schwartz.

The Queensland Katter's Australian Party supports castle law, In 2025, 122,000 signed a petition for castle law in Queensland.

=== Brazil ===
Since 1917, with the enacting of the first Brazilian Civil Code, a possessor of a thing, moveable or immoveable, is allowed, in case of disturbance ("turbação") or expulsion ("esbulho"), to "maintain or to reintegrate himself [at the possession of a thing] using its own force, as well as he does it soon". The acts of force employed by the possessor shall not exceed the necessary ones for eliminating the disturbance or for reintegration (Article 502 of the former Civil Code; Federal Ordinary Law 3.071/1917). This possibility remained untouched on the Brazilian Civil Code of 2002 (Federal Ordinary Law 10.406/2002), in its Article 1.210.

Self-defence of possession is not allowed for the cases of threat ("ameaça"). It is needed for the possessor to be effectively and physically disturbed in its possession ("turbação") or completely severed from it ("esbulho"). A possessor acting under the prescriptions of Article 1.210 of the Civil Code shall be exempt of any civil or criminal responsibility. In terms of Tort Law, Article 188, inc. I, of the Civil Code states that is not an unlawful act "the regular exercise of a right recognized by the law".

=== Canada ===
According to the Criminal Code of Canada Sections 34 and 35, (which were updated in 2012 with the passage of Bill C-26) force, up to and including lethal force may be used in defence of one's life or "peaceably" possessed property or the defence of another's life or "peaceably" possessed property, and is not considered an offence so long as the person believes that force is being used against them in the case of self-defence; that someone is about to, or has, broken into or damaged property in the case of defence of property; that they are acting in defence of themselves, someone else or "peaceably" possessed property, and that the act and degree of force is reasonable in the circumstances. The Criminal Code also lays out the factors in either case that will be used to determine what constitutes "reasonable given the circumstances". Additionally, case law in Canada has unambiguously held that the use of lethal force in defence of property alone is not reasonable. The changes made by the government were to clarify the laws involving self-defence and defence of property, and to help legal professionals to apply the law as believed to reflect the values Canadians hold to be acceptable.

=== Czech Republic ===
Czech law abandoned the duty to retreat in 1852. Since then, the successive recodifications of criminal law lacked any such requirement. While there is no explicit castle doctrine provision in the law, the jurisprudence and court practice accept the right to use force in order to expel an invader from defender's home. In 2015 case, the Constitutional Court dismissed a conviction of a man who had shot through his front door and wounded a police SWAT member that was trying to ram through, thinking that criminals are trying to get inside. In the decision, the Constitutional Court held that "the sanctity of the home is one of the most important liberties protected by the constitutional order of the Czech Republic, thus the legitimacy of its defense cannot be put into doubt".

=== England and Wales ===
In English common law a defendant may seek to avoid criminal or civil liability by claiming that he acted in self-defence. This requires the jury to determine whether the defendant believed that force was proportionate to defend him or herself, their property, or to prevent a crime, and that the force used was reasonable. Though the common law duty to retreat was repealed by the Criminal Law Act 1967, this duty never applied when a person was somewhere they had a lawful right to be (e.g., their home).

The Criminal Justice and Immigration Act 2008 placed self-defence law onto a statutory footing. Section 76 of that Act was amended by section 43 of the Crime and Courts Act 2013, to ensure that householders who use disproportionate (but not grossly disproportionate) force to defend themselves or others in their homes will not be regarded as acting unlawfully. This includes the intentional killing of an intruder. The Crown Prosecution Service has noted that this provision does not allow excessive acts such as the killing of an unconscious intruder, or the setting of booby traps.

=== Germany ===
German law allows self-defense against an unlawful attack, without any duty to retreat. Courts have interpreted this law as applicable to home invasion, including the use of lethal force against law enforcement in cases where the home owner was of the mistaken belief that the intrusion was an unlawful attack on his life.

=== Ireland ===
Under the terms of the Criminal Law (Defence and the Dwelling) Act 2011, property owners or residents are entitled to defend themselves with force, up to and including lethal force. Any individual who uses force against a trespasser is not guilty of an offense if he or she honestly believes that the intruder was there to commit a criminal act and posed a threat to life. However, there is a further provision which requires that the reaction to the intruder is such that another reasonable person in the same circumstances would likely employ. This provision acts as a safeguard against grossly disproportionate use of force, while still allowing a person to use force in nearly all circumstances.

The law was introduced in response to DPP v. Pádraig Nally. The Act largely places previous Irish common law jurisprudence regarding self-defense on a statutory footing.

=== Israel ===
Israeli law allows property owners to defend themselves with non lethal force and with a duty to retreat. This law was introduced in response to the trial of Shai Dromi, an Israeli farmer who shot Arab intruders on his farm late at night in 2007.

=== Italy ===
Italy passed a law in 2005 that allowed property owners to defend themselves with force but required proof that the intruder posed an immediate physical threat. In 2019, the law was expanded to say that a property owner can protect their property with a firearm against perceived threats without fear of being prosecuted. The law also offers free legal aid and defence counsel costs for those who kill or injure an intruder.

=== Sweden ===
Swedish self defence law allows for defence of property (not only one's home) as well as persons. The force used in defence must not be obviously disproportionate to that which is under threat. That is, deadly force can not be used in self defence unless the threat includes deadly force, for example against a simple theft. Sweden also has a citizen's arrest law that provides for arresting e.g. trespassers until police arrives.

== See also ==
- Duty to retreat, obligation to withdraw rather than attack, overridden by castle doctrine
- Justifiable homicide, the blameless killing of a person, such as in self-defense.
- Killing of Nathan Heidelberg, 2019 death of a Texas police officer; the homeowner who shot Heidelberg on his front porch, believing him to be an intruder, was acquitted of all charges
- Stand-your-ground law, which applies the castle doctrine to any place.
- Self-defence (Australia)
- Semayne's case, 1604 case establishing the "knock-and-announce" rule in English common law, and where the "castle doctrine" phrasing comes from
- Squatting in the United States
- Trespasser

=== History ===
- Claim club

=== Related sayings ===
- a man's home is his castle
- an Englishman's home is his castle
