= Right of self-defense =

Right for people to use reasonable force or defensive force

In certain circumstances, the right of self-defense permits people to commit what would otherwise be a wrong for the purposes of self-defense, which may include defending one's life, property, and bodily integrity, or the defense of others. The right, when it applies to the defense of another, is also called alter ego defense, defense of others, or defense of a third person. In international law, states also have an analogous right to self-defense in relation to their existence and independence.

== Intellectual history ==
The Roman Law principle of dominium meant that any attack on the members of one's family or property owned was a personal attack on the pater familias – the male head of the household, who had ownership of all household property and familial descendants through the male line. The right to self-defense is phrased as the principle of vim vi repellere licet ("it is permitted to repel force by force") in the Digest of Justinian (6th century). The moral justification of this can be found in Graeco-Roman natural rights theory as enunciated by the Roman statesman Cicero (BCE 106–43) and Aristotle. Another early application of this was Martin Luther's concept of justified resistance against a Beerwolf ruler, which was used in the doctrine of the lesser magistrate propounded in the 1550 Magdeburg Confession.

In Leviathan (1651), Hobbes (using the English term self-defense for the first time) proposed the foundation political theory that distinguishes between a state of nature where there is no authority and a modern state. Hobbes argues that although some may be stronger or more intelligent than others in their natural state, none are so strong as to be beyond a fear of violent death, which justifies self-defense as the highest necessity.

The English philosopher John Locke (1632–1704) posited that natural rights were self-evident and gave man the power "to pursue life, health, liberty and possessions," as well as the right to self-defense. This concept was taken by the Founders of the United States and formulated by Thomas Jefferson in the Declaration of Independence. In the Two Treatises of Government, Locke asserts the reason why an owner would give up their autonomy:

... the enjoyment of the property he has in this state is very unsafe, very unsecure. This makes him willing to quit a condition, which, however free, is full of fears and continual dangers: and it is not without reason, that he seeks out, and is willing to join in society with others, who are already united, or have a mind to unite, for the mutual preservation of their lives, liberties and estates, which many call by the general name, property.

As an aspect of sovereignty, in his 1918 speech "Politik als Beruf" ("Politics as a Vocation"), Max Weber defined a state as an authority claiming the monopoly on the legitimate use of physical force within defined territorial boundaries. Recognizing that the modern framework of nations has emerged from the use of force, Weber asserted that the exercise of power through the institutions of government remained indispensable for effective government at any level which necessarily implies that self-help is limited if not excluded.

== Legal theory ==
In modern legal theory, there are two distinct theoretical conceptions of self defense in relation to justification. One school of thought, as espoused by theorists such as Glanville Williams, argues that self defense is permissible because the use of force is justified and therefore not criminal. On the other hand, some theorists believe that, although the use of force remains criminal, it may be justified, excused, or otherwise be regarded as lawful because of the circumstances.

=== Nature of the right ===
According to Hohfeld's theory of rights, a correlative relationship exists between right and duty as an aspect of social relations. Robert Nozick is critical of Hohfeld's view, asserting that there are no positive civil rights, only rights to property and the right of autonomy. In this theory, the "acquisition principle" states that people are entitled to defend and retain all holdings acquired in a just way and the "rectification principle" requires that any violation of the first principle be repaired by returning holdings to their rightful owners as a "one time" redistribution. Hence, in default of self-defense in the first instance, any damage to property must be made good either in kind or by value. Similarly, theorists such as George Fletcher and Robert Schopp have adopted concepts of autonomy in their liberal theories to justify the right-holder using necessary force to defend his or her autonomy and rights.

== Legal doctrine ==
In criminal law, self-defense permits people to commit what would otherwise be a wrong for the purposes of self-defense, which may include defending one's life, property, and bodily integrity. Across jurisdictions, judges will consider a number of similar factors when allowing for the criminal defense of self-defense, including the nature of the danger perceived by the defendant, the necessity and proportionality of the use of force, the location of the defendant, and whether the assailant was provoked by the defendant. Force may also sometimes be used to protect another from danger. Self-defense also exists in tort law.

== Theology ==
The Catholic catechism reads: "Legitimate defense can be not only a right but also a grave duty for one who is responsible for the lives of others. The defense of the common good requires that an unjust aggressor be rendered unable to cause harm." Furthermore, as "it happens that the need to render the aggressor incapable of causing harm sometimes involves taking his life."

== United States jurisprudence ==
In criminal law, if a defendant commits a crime because of a threat of deadly or grievous harm, or a reasonable perception of such harm, the defendant is said to have a "perfect self-defense" justification. If a defendant commits a crime because of such a perception, and the perception is not reasonable, the defendant may have "imperfect self-defense" as an excuse.

=== American libertarianism ===
In the United States, the right to self-defense is related to the right to keep and bear arms. American libertarianism characterizes the majority of laws as intrusive to personal autonomy and, in particular, argues that the right of self-defense from coercion is a fundamental human right, that justifies uses of armed violence stemming from this right, regardless whether in defense of the person or property. Second-amendment proponents in particular, believe that the right to self-defense extends collectively to the community to curb or prevent tyrannical government.

=== Common law cases ===
In People v. La Voie, Supreme Court of Colorado, 395 P.2d 1001 (1964), The court wrote, "When a person has reasonable grounds for believing, and does in fact actually believe, that danger of his being killed, or of receiving great bodily harm, is imminent, he may act on such appearances and defend himself, even to the extent of taking human life when necessary, although it may turn out that the appearances were false, or although he may have been mistaken as to the extent of the real actual danger."

== Definition in specific countries ==
- Self-defence (Australia)
- Self-defence (Czech Republic)
- Self-defense (Sweden)
- Self-defence in English law
- Self-defense (United States)

== See also ==
- Justifiable homicide
- Overview of gun laws by nation
- Pikuach nefesh
- Son assault demesne
- Use of force continuum

== Bibliography ==
- Sir Edward Coke, The First Part of the Institutes of the Laws of England, or, A Commentary on Littleton (London, 1628, ed. F. Hargrave and C. Butler, 19th ed., London, 1832)
- Dressler, Joshua, New Thoughts About the Concept of Justification in the Criminal Law: A Critique of Fletcher's Thinking and Rethinking, (1984) 32 UCLA L. Rev. 61.
- Green, Stuart P. (1999). "Castles and Carjackers: Proportionality and the Use of Deadly Force in Defense of Dwellings and Vehicles". University of Illinois Law Review. 1999 (1). SSRN 123890.
- Kadish, Sanford H.; Schulhofer, Stephen J.; Barkow, Rachel E. (2017). Criminal Law and its Processes: Cases and Materials (10th ed.). New York: Wolters Kluwer.
- Maguigan, H. (1991). "Battered Women and Self-Defense: Myths and Misconceptions in Current Reform Proposals". University of Pennsylvania Law Review. 140 (2): 379–486. doi:10.2307/3312349. JSTOR 3312349. Archived from the original on October 8, 2014.
- Nourse, V. F. (2001). "Self-Defense and Subjectivity". The University of Chicago Law Review. 68 (4): 1235–1308. doi:10.2307/1600480. JSTOR 1600480.
- Segev, Re'em (2005). "Fairness, Responsibility and Self-Defense". Santa Clara Law Review. 45 (2): 383–460. SSRN 756947.
- "Criminal Law: Self-Defense". Michigan Law Review, vol. 2, no. 8, 1904, pp. 727–28, JSTOR, https://doi.org/10.2307/1272411. Accessed 18 May 2023.
