= Duty to retreat =

Legal requirement

In law, the duty to retreat, or requirement of safe retreat, is a legal requirement in some jurisdictions that a threatened person cannot harm another in self-defense (especially lethal force) when it is possible instead to retreat to a place of safety. This requirement contrasts with some other jurisdictions to stand one's ground, meaning being allowed to defend one's self instead of retreating.

It is a specific component which sometimes appears in the criminal defense of self-defense, and which must be addressed if criminal defendants are to prove that their conduct was justified. Depending on the state the criminal defendants have to prove a minimal time period of safe retreat.

== English law ==
In English law the focus of the test is whether the defendant is acting reasonably in the particular situation. There is no specific requirement that a person must retreat in anticipation of an attack. Although some withdrawal would be useful evidence to prove that the defendant did not want to fight, not every defendant is able to escape. In R v Bird the defendant was physically attacked, and reacted instinctively and immediately without having the opportunity to retreat. Had there been a delay in the response, the reaction might have appeared more revenge than self-defense.

=== Carrying weapons ===
As to carrying weapons in anticipation of an attack, Evans v Hughes held that for a defendant to justify his possession of a metal bar on a public highway, he had to show that there was an imminent particular threat affecting the particular circumstances in which the weapon was carried. Similarly, in Taylor v Mucklow a building owner was held to be using an unreasonable degree of force in carrying a loaded airgun against a builder who was demolishing a new extension because his bills were unpaid. More dramatically, in AG's Reference (No 2 of 1983) Lord Lane held that a defendant who manufactured ten petrol bombs to defend his shop during the Toxteth riots could set up the defense of showing that he possessed an explosive substance "for a lawful purpose" if he could establish that he was acting in self-defense to protect himself or his family or property against an imminent and apprehended attack by means which he believed to be no more than reasonably necessary to meet the attack.

== United States law ==
Stand your ground law and duty to retreat by US jurisdiction Stand-your-ground by statute Stand-your-ground by judicial decision or jury instruction Duty to retreat except in one's home Duty to retreat except in one's home or workplace Duty to retreat except in one's home or vehicle or workplace Middle-ground approach (DC, WI) No settled rule (AS, VI)

Most U.S. jurisdictions have a stand-your-ground law or apply what is known as the castle doctrine, whereby a threatened person need not retreat within their own dwelling or place of work. Sometimes this has been the result of court rulings that one need not retreat in a place where one has a special right to be. In other states, this has been accomplished by statute, such as that suggested by the Model Penal Code.

In Erwin v. State (1876), the Supreme Court of Ohio wrote that a "true man", one without fault, would not retreat. In Runyan v. State (1877), the Indiana court rejected a duty to retreat, saying, "the tendency of the American mind seems to be very strongly against" a duty to retreat.

== See also ==
- Castle doctrine in the United States
- Right of self-defense
- Stand-your-ground law
- Trespasser
