= Self-defence in English law =

Defence at law to an otherwise criminal act

Self-defence is a defence permitting reasonable force to be used to defend one's self or another. This defence arises from both common law and the Criminal Law Act 1967. Self-defence is a justification defence rather than excuse.

== Principles ==
=== Common law (self defence) ===
The common law defence of self-defence applies where the defendant uses necessary, reasonable and proportionate force to defend themselves or another from imminent attack. It is a complete defence to all non-sexual offences involving the unlawful use of force (anything from battery to murder). Because the defence results in a complete acquittal, the courts have interpreted the defence in a restrictive way so as to avoid acquitting too easily. For example, the courts will not usually acquit the defendant just because he thought the force used was reasonable – whether or not the force used was reasonable will be objectively assessed by the jury and not simply according to what the defendant thought at the time.

A defendant is entitled to use reasonable force to protect himself, others for whom he is responsible and his property. … It must be reasonable.

— Beckford v The Queen [1988] AC 130

Lord Morris in Palmer v R stated the following about someone confronted by an intruder or defending himself against attack:

If there has been an attack so that defence is reasonably necessary, it will be recognised that a person defending himself cannot weigh to a nicety the exact measure of his defensive action. If the jury thought that in a moment of unexpected anguish a person attacked had only done what he honestly and instinctively thought necessary, that would be the most potent evidence that only reasonable defensive action had been taken…

— Palmer v R [1971] AC 814

=== Reasonable force ===
Force is reasonable if a person would think it is necessary to use force and would have used the same level of force as the defendant. This test is fundamentally objective: the defendant may not decide for himself what is reasonable based on his own values. However, the hypothetical reasonable person is imbued with the defendant's factual beliefs about the circumstances. This is the case even if the defendant's beliefs about the circumstances are mistaken.

Whether the force was reasonable is a question of fact for the jury. The jury may take into account all relevant circumstances of the case, including the level of threat (as the defendant believed it to be), the pressure of being under attack, the likely harm and the interests the defendant was protecting. However, the jury may not rely on facts unknown to the defendant. For example, if the defendant was unaware that the victim had a knife, the jury must ignore the fact that the victim was armed.

The classic test comes from the case of Palmer v The Queen, on appeal to the Privy Council in 1971:

The defence of self-defence is one which can be and will be readily understood by any jury. It is a straightforward conception. It involves no abstruse legal thought. … Only common sense is needed for its understanding. It is both good law and good sense that a man who is attacked may defend himself. It is both good law and good sense that he may do, but may only do, what is reasonably necessary. But everything will depend upon the particular facts and circumstances. … It may in some cases be only sensible and clearly possible to take some simple avoiding action. Some attacks may be serious and dangerous. Others may not be. If there is some relatively minor attack it would not be common sense to permit some action of retaliation which was wholly out of proportion to the necessities of the situation. If an attack is serious so that it puts someone in immediate peril then immediate defensive action may be necessary. If the moment is one of crisis for someone in imminent danger he may have [to] avert the danger by some instant reaction. If the attack is all over and no sort of peril remains then the employment of force may be by way of revenge or punishment or by way of paying off an old score or may be pure aggression. There may no longer be any link with a necessity of defence… If a jury thought that in a moment of unexpected anguish a person attacked had only done what he honestly and instinctively thought was necessary that would be most potent evidence that only reasonable defensive action had been taken.

— Palmer v The Queen [1971] AC 814, 832

The Legal Aid, Sentencing and Punishment of Offenders Act 2012 inserted a new section 76(6A) into the Criminal Justice and Immigration Act 2008. This provision clarifies that there is no duty to retreat, although an opportunity to retreat may still be taken into account when assessing whether the force was reasonable.

In R v Lindsay, the defendant, who picked up a sword in self-defence when attacked in his home by three masked intruders armed with loaded handguns, killed one of them by slashing him repeatedly. The prosecution case was that, although he had initially acted in self-defence, he had then lost his self-control and demonstrated a clear intent to kill the armed intruder. The Court of Appeal confirmed an eight-year term of imprisonment.

In April 2013, the Crime and Courts Act 2013 further amended section 76. This amended the law to clarify that homeowners may still rely on self-defence in some cases where the force used is unreasonable, so long as it is not grossly disproportionate. This was further clarified by the High Court in January 2016.

=== Belief in imminent attack ===
The modern law on belief is stated in R v Owino:

A person may use such force as is [objectively] reasonable in the circumstances as he [subjectively] believes them to be.

— R v Owino (1996) 2 Cr. App. R. 128 at 134

If the defendant genuinely believes that an attack is imminent or underway, it does not matter that they were mistaken.

Preemptive self-defence is permissible in some cases. Lord Griffith said in Beckford v R:

A man about to be attacked does not have to wait for his assailant to strike the first blow or fire the first shot; circumstances may justify a pre-emptive strike.

— R v Beckford (1988) 1 AC 130

A defendant does not necessarily lose the right to claim self-defence merely because they instigated the confrontation. In some cases, a person who kills in the course of a quarrel or crime they started might still act in self-defence if the victim disproportionately escalates the violence. In Rashford, the defendant sought out the victim, intending to attack him as revenge for an earlier dispute. The victim and his friends responded out of proportion to the defendant's aggression. At this point, the defendant had to switch from aggression to defence. The Court of Appeal held that the defendant will only lose the defence by being the aggressor throughout. The question is whether the defendant feared that he was in immediate danger from which he had no other means of escape, and if the violence he used was no more than appeared necessary to preserve his own life or protect himself from serious injury, he would be entitled to rely on self-defence. On the facts, the jury's decision to convict was not unsafe.

==== Intoxication ====
The rule that the defendant can rely on any honest belief is altered where the defendant has consumed alcohol or drugs. In R v Letenock, the defendant claimed mistakenly to believe that the victim was about to attack him. The judge directed the jury that his drunkenness was irrelevant unless he was so drunk as to be incapable of knowing what he was doing. The Court of Criminal Appeal quashed his conviction for murder and substituted a verdict of manslaughter. Lord Reading CJ said at 224:

The only element of doubt in the case is whether there was anything which might have caused the applicant, in his drunken condition, to believe that he was going to be struck.

— R v Letenock (1917) 12 Cr. App. R. 221

This suggests that the question is whether there was any intelligible basis for the defendant’s belief. Hatton held that a defendant who raised the issue of self-defence was not entitled to rely on a mistaken belief induced by voluntary intoxication, regardless of whether the defence was raised against a charge of murder or one of manslaughter. This applied the ratio decidendi in R v O' Grady for murder and R v Majewski for manslaughter. It follows that, if the defendant is voluntarily drunk and kills in what he mistakenly imagines to be self-defence because he imagines (as in Hatton) that the deceased was attacking him with a sword, he has no defence to a charge of murder; but if he claims to be so intoxicated that he is experiencing hallucinations and imagines that he is fighting giant snakes (as in Lipman) then he can be guilty only of manslaughter.

The House of Commons Library compiled a list of people who have acted in self-defence as part of its briefing on the Criminal Law (Amendment) (Householder Protection) Bill 2005.

== Statutory law ==
Section 3 of the Criminal Law Act 1967 provides that:

(1) A person may use such force as is reasonable in the circumstances in the prevention of crime, or in effecting or assisting in the lawful arrest of offenders or suspected offenders or of persons unlawfully at large.

(2) Subsection (1) above shall replace the rules of the common law on the question when force used for a purpose mentioned in the subsection is justified by that purpose.

The definition of what constitutes a 'crime' was clarified under R v Jones (Margaret), R v Milling et al: HL 29 MAR 2006 which stated it covered any domestic criminal offence under the law of England and Wales.

Thus, reasonable force can be used in the prevention of any crime or in making an arrest to:

1. allow the defendant to defend himself from any form of attack so long as the attack is criminal.
2. prevent an attack on another person, e.g. in R v Rose, a young son shot dead his father to protect his mother from a serious assault, believing that this was the only practical way of defending her given his small physical size.
3. defend his property against criminal attack in the widest sense, i.e. it can be physical possessions like a watch or credit cards demanded by a mugger (where there would also be physical danger to the owner) or, at the other extreme, possession of land.

Section 76 of the Criminal Justice and Immigration Act 2008 codifies English case law on self-defence. It made no changes to the law. However, the section was amended on 25 April 2013 by section 43 of the Crime and Courts Act 2013 to allow people to use greater force in defence of their homes against burglars. In those circumstances, force may still be reasonable even if disproportionate as long as it is not "grossly disproportionate."

The Human Rights Act 1998 incorporates into English law article 2 of the European Convention on Human Rights, which defines the right to life as follows:

1. Everyone's right to life shall be protected by law. No one shall be deprived of his life intentionally save in the execution of a sentence of a court following his conviction of a crime for which this penalty is provided by law.
2. Deprivation of life shall not be regarded as inflicted in contravention of this Article when it results from the use of force which is no more than absolutely necessary:
  (a) in defence of any person from unlawful violence;
  (b) in order to effect a lawful arrest or to prevent the escape of a person lawfully detained;
  (c) in action lawfully taken for the purpose of quelling a riot or insurrection.

== Action by private citizens ==
=== Arrest ===
Under section 24A of the Police and Criminal Evidence Act 1984, a person other than a constable may arrest without a warrant anyone who is committing, or has committed, an indictable offence, or whom they have reasonable grounds to suspect of it (citizen's arrest). The power can be used only where the person making the arrest has reasonable grounds for believing the arrest is necessary for one of the reasons listed in the section, such as preventing injury, damage to property or escape, and it is not reasonably practicable for a constable to make it instead. Section 3(1) of the Criminal Law Act 1967 allows a person to use such force as is reasonable in the circumstances in effecting or assisting in the lawful arrest of offenders or suspected offenders. In R v Renouf, the Court of Appeal ruled that s3(1) was available against a charge of reckless driving where the defendant had used his car to chase some people who had assaulted him and had manoeuvred his car to prevent their escape. Lawton LJ said:

This case has to be considered in the light of the evidence, which was said to have amounted to reckless driving. This evidence had two facets: one was what the prosecution alleged to be the acts of recklessness; and the other was that these same acts amounted to the use of reasonable force for the purpose of assisting in the lawful arrest of offenders.

— R v Renouf (1986) 2 AER 449

=== Prevention of crime ===
The right to use reasonable force to prevent crime comes from statute (S3 Criminal Law Act 1967). In R v Jones [2006] UKHL 16, the House of Lords held that a "crime" within section 3 means a crime in domestic law. The common law also allows reasonable force in defence of property, but only to defend it from actual or imminent damage that would itself be unlawful or criminal.

There is no duty to retreat, although the possibility of retreat is a factor in assessing reasonableness, and a person need not wait for the first blow. A motive of revenge does not of itself rule out self-defence; it depends on the circumstances. Physical characteristics can be relevant to reasonableness.

=== Prevention of breach of peace ===
Every constable and every citizen has the power, and is under a duty, to seek to prevent a breach of the peace occurring in their presence, one likely to be renewed, or one about to occur, by arrest or by action short of arrest. There is also a common law duty to assist the police in preserving the peace when asked to do so.

== Use of force by police officers ==
In R v Dadson, a police officer shot and wounded an escaping thief. At the time, any degree of force could be used to arrest a fleeing felon but, when he fired the gun, he did not know who the thief was. He was convicted of intentionally causing grievous bodily harm because the thief was shot and the gun was fired by a man not caring whether the shot was lawful or not. That the thief was later proved to be a felon did not prevent a concurrence between actus reus and mens rea at the instant the shot was fired, i.e. no retrospective justification is allowed. It is noted that the death of Jean Charles de Menezes at the Stockwell tube station, south London, on 22 July 2005 resulted from the use of a then secret shoot-to-kill policy called Operation Kratos. English law has no general defence of superior orders, and the conduct of every police officer has to be judged on the facts as they believed them to be.

In R v Pagett, to resist lawful arrest, the defendant held a pregnant girl in front of him as a shield and shot at armed policemen who returned fire as permitted under their rules of engagement, killing the girl. It is a proportionate response to shooting, to shoot back. In balancing the harms, the greater harm to be avoided is a violent suspect firing and killing a police officer or any other bystander. On the issue of whether the defendant caused the victim's death, the Court of Appeal held that the reasonable actions of a third party acting in self-defence and defence of others could not be regarded as a novus actus interveniens because self-defence was a foreseeable consequence of his action and had not broken the chain of causation.

In Beckford v R the defendant police officer was told that a suspect was armed and dangerous. When that man ran out of a house towards him, the defendant shot him because he feared for his own life. The prosecution case was that the victim had been unarmed and thus presented no threat to the defendant. Lord Griffiths approved a model direction to juries, laid down by Lord Lane in R. v Williams:

Whether the plea is self-defence or defence of another, if the defendant may have been labouring under a mistake as to facts, he must be judged according to his mistaken belief of the facts: that is so whether the mistake was, on an objective view, a reasonable mistake or not.

— R. v Williams

The defendant, therefore, had a defence of self-defence because the killing was not unlawful if, in the circumstances, as he perceived them to be, he had used reasonable force to defend himself.

== Use of force by soldiers ==
Since the "war on terrorism" began in 2001, the UK has seen a substantial increase in the use of armed police officers. The issue of the extent to which soldiers may be allowed to shoot a suspect in defence of themselves and others has therefore become more relevant to English law, although it has always been highly relevant given the role of the military in the policing of Northern Ireland. In AG for Northern Ireland's Reference, a soldier on patrol in Northern Ireland shot and killed an unarmed man, who ran away when challenged. The trial judge held that the prosecution had failed to prove that the soldier intended to kill or cause serious bodily harm, and that the homicide was justifiable under section 3 of the Criminal Law Act (Northern Ireland) 1967 (identical wording to the English section). The Lords decided that the judge's ruling was purely one of fact, and therefore declined to answer the legal question of justification. But Lord Diplock commented:

There is little authority in English law concerning the rights and duties of a member of the armed forces of the Crown when acting in aid of the civil power; and what little authority there is relates almost entirely to the duties of soldiers when troops are called upon to assist in controlling a riotous assembly. Where used for such temporary purposes it may not be inaccurate to describe the rights and duties of a soldier as being no more than those of an ordinary citizen in uniform. But such a description is in my view misleading in the circumstances in which the army is currently employed in aid of the civil power in Northern Ireland. In theory it may be the duty of every citizen when an arrestable offence is about to be committed in his presence to take whatever reasonable measures are available to him to prevent the commission of the crime; but the duty is one of imperfect obligation and it does not place him under any obligation to do anything by which he would expose himself to risk of personal injury, nor is he under any duty to search for criminals or seek out crime. In contrast to this a soldier who is employed in aid of the civil power in Northern Ireland is under a duty, enforceable under military law, to search for criminals if so ordered by his superior officer and to risk his own life should this be necessary in preventing terrorist acts. For the performance of this duty he is armed with a firearm, a self-loading rifle, from which a bullet, if it hits the human body, is almost certain to cause serious injury if not death.

— AG for Northern Ireland's Reference (No 1 of 1975) (1977) AC 105

In R v Clegg Lord Lloyd of Berwick said at 497:

In the case of a soldier in Northern Ireland, in the circumstances in which Private Clegg found himself, there is no scope for graduated force. The only choice lay between firing a high-velocity rifle which, if aimed accurately, was almost certain to kill or injure, and doing nothing at all.

— R v Clegg (1995) 1 AC 482

One interpretation would be that, when a government deploys highly armed soldiers, equipped and trained to kill, in a civilian area, the law must give the armed forces greater licence to kill than would be granted to any other person including, presumably, a less lethally equipped police officer. In the event, Private Clegg was convicted of murder. He had been on patrol to catch joyriders, and fired three shots at the windscreen of a speeding car as it approached the checkpoint. He fired a fourth shot, killing a passenger, after the car had passed him and was speeding away. The first three shots were fired in self-defence, or in defence of fellow soldiers, but the fourth shot was not a response to imminent danger. The judge dismissed the evidence of bruising to a fellow soldier's leg as a fabrication to suggest injury to that soldier from the car. The Lords observed that army Rules of Engagement given to every soldier on a "yellow card" entitled "[i]nstructions for opening fire in Northern Ireland" could, on a literal reading, justify firing on a car where a person had been injured by it, irrespective of the seriousness of the injury. But, in any event, the Lords said that the card had no legal force because English law does not have a general defence of superior orders. Lord Lloyd of Berwick cited with approval the Australian High Court in A v Hayden (No 2) followed by the Privy Council in Yip Chiu-Cheung v The Queen where the "good" motive of the undercover drug enforcement officer was irrelevant (the accused conspired to take drugs from Hong Kong to Australia - as the officer intended the agreement to be carried out to break a drugs ring, a conspiracy between the two was proved. In A v Hayden, Murphy J. stated:

In Australia it is no defence to the commission of a criminal act or omission that it was done in obedience to the orders of a superior or the government. Military and civilians have a duty to obey lawful orders, and a duty to disobey unlawful orders.

— A v Hayden (No 2) (1984) 156 CLR 532

== Reform ==
The Law Commission's report on Partial Defences to Murder rejects the notion of creating a mitigatory defence to cover the use of excessive force in self-defence, but accepts that the "all or nothing" effect can produce unsatisfactory results in murder cases. For example, a battered woman or abused child using excessive force because they are physically at a disadvantage and not under imminent attack, would be denied a defence. Further, an occupant not sure if violence to defend their property against invasion is reasonable, may feel forced to do nothing. It was always possible the same set of facts could be interpreted as either self-defence or provocation where there was a loss of control resulting in death. Thus, the Commission recommends a redefinition of provocation to cover situations where a person acts lethally out of fear. This reflects the present view of psychiatrists that most people act in violent situations with a combination of fear and anger in their minds, and to separate the two emotions is not legally constructive.

== See also ==
- Castle doctrine
