= Killing of Trayvon Martin =

2012 killing of teenager in Sanford, Florida

- Map of Sanford, Florida
- Date: February 26, 2012; 14 years ago
- Time: 7:09 p.m. EST (start); 7:16 p.m. (gunshot on 911 call); 7:17 p.m. (police car arrives); 7:30 p.m. (Martin declared dead)
- Location: The Retreat at Twin Lakes in Sanford, Florida, U.S. (See aerial views of points of interest.); 28.79295°N 81.32965°W
- Type: Homicide by shooting
- Participants: George Zimmerman (shooter)
- Deaths: Trayvon Martin
- Injuries: Fractured nose, lacerations to the back of the head. (Zimmerman)
- Charges: Second-degree murder, lesser included offense of manslaughter.
- Trial: Florida v. Zimmerman
- Verdict: Not guilty

On the evening of February 26, 2012, in Sanford, Florida, United States, George Zimmerman fatally shot Trayvon Martin, a 17-year-old African-American teenager.

Zimmerman, a 28-year-old multiracial man who identifies as Hispanic, (Note: Zimmerman's mother was from Peru, and his maternal great-grandfather was of Afro-Peruvian descent.) was a neighborhood watch coordinator for the gated community where Martin was visiting relatives at the time of the shooting. Zimmerman became suspicious of Martin and called police. During an altercation, Zimmerman shot and killed Martin with a pistol.

In a widely reported trial, Zimmerman was charged with second-degree murder for Martin's death. He was later acquitted by a jury after saying he acted in self-defense. Martin was unarmed during the encounter. The incident was reviewed by the Department of Justice for potential civil rights violations, but no additional charges were filed.

== Parties involved ==
=== Trayvon Martin ===
An undated personal photo of Trayvon Martin wearing a hoodie was displayed by protesters and sold by merchants on hoodies, T-shirts, and keychains, prompting the family to trademark slogans using his name.

Trayvon Benjamin Martin was the son of Sybrina Fulton and Tracy Martin, who were divorced in 1999. He was a junior at Dr. Michael M. Krop High School and lived with his mother and older brother in Miami Gardens, Florida. On the day he was fatally shot, he and his father were visiting his father's fiancée and her son at her town home in Sanford, Florida. She lived in The Retreat at Twin Lakes, a gated community Martin had visited several times before.

According to his autopsy, Martin was 5 feet 11 inches (1.80 m) tall and weighed 158 pounds (72 kg) at the time of his death.

=== George Zimmerman ===
George Michael Zimmerman was born in Manassas, Virginia, and is the son of Gladys (née Mesa) Zimmerman, born in Peru, and Robert Zimmerman Sr., a retired Virginia magistrate. At the time of the shooting, Zimmerman was employed as an insurance fraud investigator. He had been working toward an associate degree in criminal justice at Seminole State College. In one of his interviews with the police, he said his goal was to become a judge.

At the time of his arrest on April 11, 2012, Zimmerman's height was reportedly 5 feet 7 inches (1.70 m) and his weight 185 lb (84 kg), according to the Seminole County Sheriff's Office Inmate Booking record. Zimmerman's height was shown as 5 feet 8 inches (1.73 m) and his weight at 200 lb (91 kg) on the Sanford Police Department Offense Report for February 26, 2012, the night of the shooting.

Zimmerman and his wife moved to The Retreat at Twin Lakes in 2009.

=== Sanford Police Department ===
Bill Lee had been chief of the Sanford Police Department for ten months when the shooting of Martin occurred. Prior to Lee becoming chief, the department had been accused of protecting relatives of police officers involved in violent incidents with black people. Trayvon Martin's case resulted in increased distrust between the police and Sanford's black community.

On March 22, Chief Lee temporarily stepped down from his position because of public criticism over his handling of the Trayvon Martin shooting. In April, the Sanford City Commission refused to accept Lee's resignation and stated that "Lee's spotless record showed there needed to be further review to determine if he failed in his duties." Lee was fired on June 20, 2012, by Sanford City Manager Norton Bonaparte. Lee responded by saying, "I continue to stand by the work performed by the Sanford Police Department in this tragic shooting, which has been plagued by misrepresentations and false statements for interests other than justice."

On June 26, 2012, the lead investigator of the case, Christopher Serino, was transferred from the Sanford Police Department's investigative unit and reassigned to the patrol division at his own request. Serino said he felt pressured by several of his fellow police officers to press charges against Zimmerman, although he believed there was not enough evidence to do so. One of the officers pressuring him was a friend of Martin's father.

In September 2012, Orlando TV station WFTV released a leaked memo in which interim police chief Richard Myers blamed the police department spokesperson, Sgt. David Morgenstern, for having mishandled the Trayvon Martin case. Myers removed Morgenstern from that position.

=== Martin family attorneys ===
Benjamin Crump, whose firm focuses on injury and civil rights cases, represented the legal interests of the Martin family.

The Martin family was also represented by Natalie Jackson, an Orlando civil rights attorney.

== Background of the shooting ==
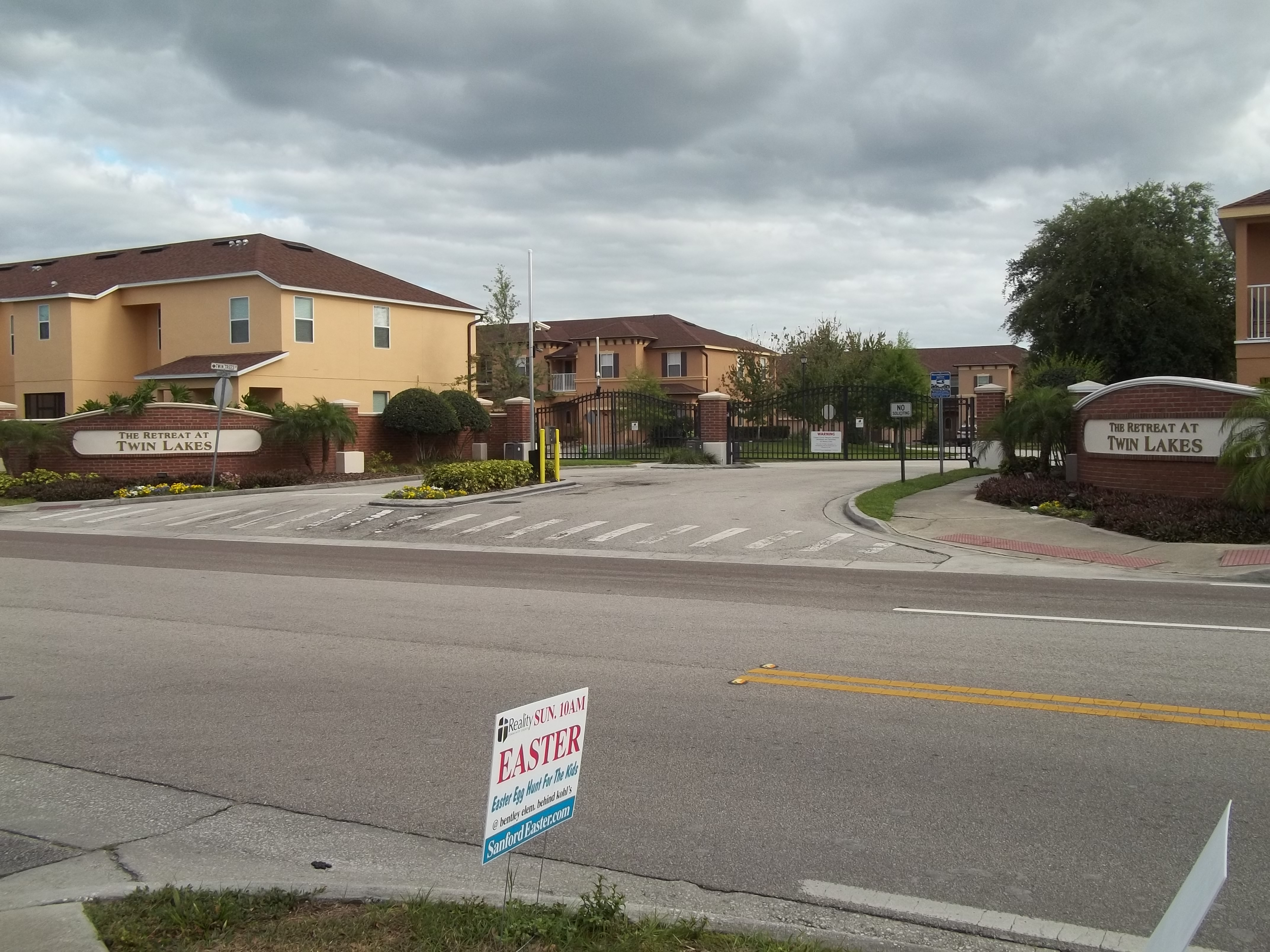
The Retreat at Twin Lakes, north entrance

The Retreat at Twin Lakes is a 260-unit, gated, townhome community in Sanford, Florida. The population of the development at the time of the shooting was about 49% non-Hispanic white, 23% Hispanic (of any race), 20% black, and 5% Asian, according to Census figures. Both George Zimmerman and Martin's father's fiancée were renting homes in the development at the time of the shooting. Martin had been staying with his father's fiancée at The Retreat.

From January 1, 2011, through February 26, 2012, police were called to The Retreat at Twin Lakes 402 times. Crimes committed at The Retreat in the year prior to Martin's death had included eight burglaries, nine thefts, and one shooting. Twin Lakes residents said there were dozens of reports of attempted break-ins, which had created an atmosphere of fear in their neighborhood.

In September 2011, the Twin Lakes residents held an organizational meeting to create a neighborhood watch program. Zimmerman was selected by neighbors as the program's coordinator, according to Wendy Dorival, the Neighborhood Watch organizer for the Sanford Police Department.

Zimmerman had made nearly 50 calls to police between 2004 and 2012 to report various local disturbances, such as loud parties, open garage doors, potholes, and children playing in the street. Following break-ins in the neighborhood in 2011, Zimmerman's calls to police increasingly focused on reporting people he suspected of criminal activity.

During the months leading up to the February 26, 2012 shooting, Zimmerman called the police several times to report people he believed to be suspicious. On each of the calls, Zimmerman offered information about the race of the suspects only when specifically asked by the dispatcher to do so; his reports said that all were black males.

According to friends and neighbors of Zimmerman, three weeks prior to the shooting on February 26, Zimmerman called police to report a young man peering into the windows of an empty Twin Lakes home. By the time police arrived, the suspect had fled. On February 6, workers witnessed two young black men lingering in the yard of a Twin Lakes resident around the same time a new laptop and some gold jewelry was stolen from her home. The next day, police discovered the stolen laptop in the backpack of a young black man that Zimmerman identified as the same person he had spotted peering into windows on February 2.

Zimmerman had been licensed to carry a firearm since November 2009.

== Shooting ==
On the evening of February 26, 2012, Zimmerman observed Martin as he returned to the Twin Lakes housing community after having walked to a nearby convenience store. (Note: The surveillance videos of Trayvon Martin from various cameras in the convenience store can be found at "Surveillance: Trayvon Martin at store night of shooting". WFTV. Archived from the original on April 2, 2015.) At the time, Zimmerman was driving through the neighborhood on a personal errand.

Zimmerman call to police
7:09:34 p.m., February 26, 2012

At approximately 7:09 p.m., (Note: Some reports in the media incorrectly gave the time as 7:11.) Zimmerman called the Sanford police non-emergency number to report a suspicious person in the Twin Lakes community. Zimmerman said, "We've had some break-ins in my neighborhood, and there's a real suspicious guy ...". He described an unknown male "just walking around looking about" in the rain and said, "This guy looks like he is up to no good or he is on drugs or something." Zimmerman reported that the person had his hand in his waistband and was walking around looking at homes. He also mentioned that Martin was wearing a "dark hoodie, like a grey hoodie." On the recording, Zimmerman is heard saying, "These assholes, they always get away."

About two minutes into the call, Zimmerman said, "He's running". The dispatcher asked, "He's running? Which way is he running?" Noises on the tape at this point have been interpreted by some media outlets as the sound of a car door chime, possibly indicating Zimmerman opened his car door. Zimmerman later acknowledged exiting his vehicle and said he walked to a nearby T-intersection to see which direction Martin had gone and to obtain an address. The dispatcher asked Zimmerman if he was following him. When Zimmerman answered, "Yeah", the dispatcher said, "We don't need you to do that." Zimmerman responded, "Okay." Zimmerman asked that police call him upon their arrival so he could provide his location. Zimmerman ended the call at 7:15 p.m.

After Zimmerman ended his call with police, a violent encounter took place between him and Martin. It ended with Zimmerman fatally shooting Martin 70 yards (64 m) from the rear door of the townhouse where Martin was staying. (Note: See The New York Times article The Events Leading to the Shooting of Trayvon Martin for seven aerial views which include depictions of The Retreat at Twin Lakes, the home where Trayvon was staying, the site of the shooting, Zimmerman's home, the site of the 7–11, and other sites of interest.)

== Investigations ==
=== Zimmerman arrested and released ===
Sanford Police Officer Timothy Smith arrived at the scene at approximately 7:17 p.m., between 5 and 65 seconds after the fatal shot was fired. He reported finding Zimmerman standing near Martin, who was lying face down in the grass and unresponsive. At that time, Zimmerman stated to Smith that he had shot Martin and was still armed. Smith handcuffed Zimmerman and confiscated his black Kel-Tec PF-9 9mm semi-automatic pistol. Smith observed that Zimmerman's back was wet and covered with grass, and he was bleeding from the nose and the back of his head.

Ricardo Ayala, the second officer to arrive that night, noticed Officer Smith had Zimmerman in custody, then observed Martin lying face down in the grass and attempted to get a response from him. At this time, Sgt. Anthony Raimondo arrived and together with Ayala began CPR. Paramedics from Sanford Fire and Rescue arrived and continued CPR, finally declaring Martin dead at 7:30 p.m.

Other officers who had arrived by this time secured the area and made contact with neighbors in the area and obtained statements from witnesses at the scene. The officers, who believed Zimmerman proceeded solely on foot before the attack, did not seize Zimmerman's vehicle until after his wife had moved it. Zimmerman was treated and released by paramedics while still at the scene of the incident. After placing Zimmerman in his police vehicle, Officer Smith heard Zimmerman say, "I was yelling for someone to help me, but no one would help me." Zimmerman was then transported to the Sanford Police Department where he was questioned by investigators for approximately five hours. The police determined that Zimmerman yelled for help at least 14 times in a 38-second span. The question of who was calling for help has been disputed since then by others and remains inconclusive.

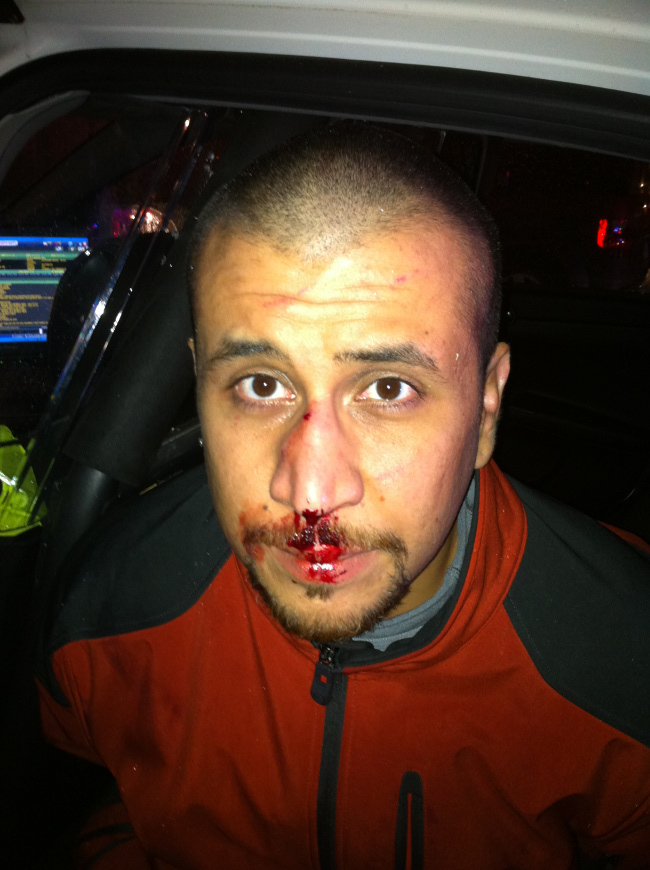
George Zimmerman with a bloody, swollen nose in the back seat of a police car on the night of the shooting

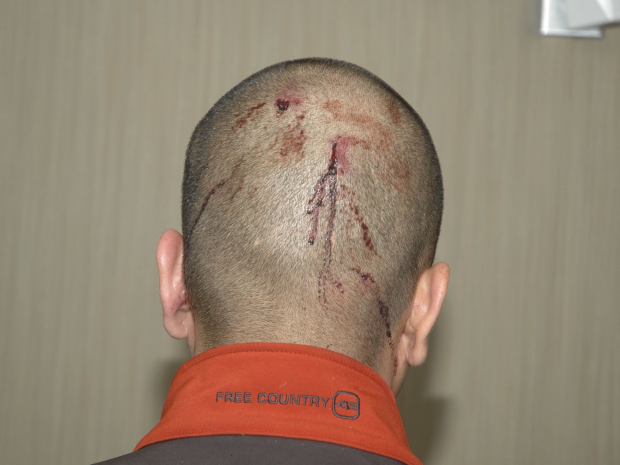
The back of Zimmerman's head at the police station

Zimmerman arrived at the police station at 7:52 p.m., according to a police video. He was interviewed by Investigator Doris Singleton and by Detective Chris Serino. Crime Scene Tech D. Smith photographed his injuries and hands and collected gunshot residue. Zimmerman's weapon was placed into evidence. His clothes were also taken as evidence after his wife arrived with a change of clothes. During the interview, detectives falsely told Zimmerman that surveillance camera footage had captured the entire incident and Zimmerman appeared relieved at this news.

Five hours later, Zimmerman was released. The police chief said that there was no evidence to refute Zimmerman's claim of having acted in self-defense, and that under Florida's Stand Your Ground statute, the police were prohibited by law from making an arrest. The police chief also said that Zimmerman had a right to defend himself with lethal force.

The day after the shooting, Zimmerman performed a videotaped reenactment of the incident for police.

Some observers, such as University of Florida law professor and defense attorney Michelle Jacobs and Columbia University law professor Patricia Williams, said that the police failed to fully investigate the shooting when they did not test Zimmerman for drugs or alcohol intoxication. However, Miami police experts told the Miami Herald that homicide suspects are not typically tested for drugs or alcohol unless the suspect has been accused of having been driving while intoxicated.

=== Martin's body identified ===
Martin's body was taken to the morgue, where he was tagged as a John Doe, as he was not carrying any identification. The mobile phone found at the shooting scene was malfunctioning to the point that the police Cellebrite data recovery device could not access it.

The Martin family alleged that Seminole County Attorney Wolfinger met personally with Sanford Chief Lee on the night of the shooting and instructed Lee not to make an arrest. Based on their accusation, the Martin family requested that the Justice Department investigate the State prosecutor's office. Wolfinger responded that the family's accusations were "outright lies" and denied that any such meeting or communication took place. Wolfinger's office reported that the Sanford police consulted with Kelly Jo Hines, the prosecutor on call the night of the shooting, but it has not been disclosed what was talked about.

=== State Attorney's investigation ===
On March 12, 2012, Police Chief Lee turned the investigation over to the State Attorney's office for review. Lee said there was not enough evidence to arrest Zimmerman. "In this case Mr. Zimmerman has made the statement of self-defense," Lee said. "Until we can establish probable cause to dispute that, we don't have the grounds to arrest him." In response to criticisms of the investigation, Lee responded that "We are taking a beating over this" and defended the investigation. "This is all very unsettling. I'm sure if George Zimmerman had the opportunity to relive Sunday, February 26, he'd probably do things differently. I'm sure Trayvon would, too."

On March 13, 2012, Detective Chris Serino sent a capias request to the state's attorney recommending charges of negligent manslaughter against Zimmerman, though Serino maintains he did not believe they had the evidence to support those charges and that manslaughter was only included in the capias in order for the prosecutor's office to continue with their own investigation. The capias states, "The encounter between George Zimmerman and Trayvon Martin was ultimately avoidable by Zimmerman, if Zimmerman had remained in his vehicle and waited the arrival of law enforcement or conversely if he had identified himself to Martin as a concerned citizen and initiated dialog in an effort to dispel each party's concern.... There is no indication that Trayvon Martin was involved in any criminal activity at the time of the encounter." The State Attorney's office initially determined there was insufficient evidence to charge Zimmerman and did not file charges based on the capias request.

On March 16, Serino told the Orlando Sentinel that his investigation had turned up no reliable evidence that cast doubt on Zimmerman's account; that he had acted in self-defense. "The best evidence we have is the testimony of George Zimmerman, and he says the decedent was the primary aggressor in the whole event; everything I have is adding up to what he says."

=== FDLE and FBI investigations ===
On March 20, 2012, State attorney Norm Wolfinger announced that a Seminole County grand jury would be convened on April 10 to investigate the death of Martin. However, after State Attorney Angela Corey was assigned to the case by Florida Governor Rick Scott on March 22, she decided that her office would decide whether to press charges. She commented: "I always lean towards moving forward without needing the grand jury in a case like this, I foresee us being able to make a decision, and move on it on our own."

Governor Scott asked the Florida Department of Law Enforcement (FDLE) to investigate the shooting and Florida Attorney General Pam Bondi confirmed that the FDLE was involved and stated "No stone will be left unturned in this investigation".

On March 20, 2012, the Justice Department announced that it was opening investigations into the incident. The FBI opened a parallel investigation into whether Martin's civil rights were violated, interviewed witnesses, and looked into Zimmerman's background.

On July 12, 2012, reports of some of the more than 30 interviews conducted by the FBI were released by Special Prosecutor Angela Corey to Zimmerman's attorney, who released them to the public. The released reports do not draw any conclusions in the DOJ investigation. The Sanford Police Department's lead investigator, Chris Serino, told FBI agents that he believed Zimmerman's actions were not based on Martin's race but instead on Martin's attire, the circumstances of the encounter, and previous burglaries in the neighborhood. Zimmerman's neighbors and co-workers were interviewed as well. Neighbors who knew Zimmerman had nothing derogatory to say about him and his co-workers were complimentary of him.

Serino also told the FBI that he had felt pressure from three officers within the department to charge Zimmerman although he "did not believe he had enough evidence at the time to file charges", and accused one of these officers of being friendly with Martin's father. He also expressed concern to the FBI about possible leaks of evidence to the media from within the department.

On July 13, 2013, shortly after the trial verdict, the U.S. Justice Department issued a statement saying its investigation into the civil rights aspects of the case was continuing. On February 24, 2015, 35 months after it began, the civil rights investigation of the Justice Department was terminated for lack of evidence. The FBI investigation was concurrently terminated for the same reason.

=== County medical examiner's autopsy report ===
The Volusia County medical examiner found that Martin was killed by an injury resulting from a single gunshot to the chest, fired at "intermediate range" between 1 and 18 inches (2.5 and 45.7 centimetres), according to a forensic expert. (Note: The autopsy report can be found at Hart, Benjamin (May 17, 2012). "Trayvon Martin Autopsy Report: Killed By Bullet Fired At Intermediate Range". The Huffington Post.) An FDLE analysis of Martin's body and clothes described the distance as "a contact shot". The autopsy also found that Martin had one small abrasion on his left ring finger below the knuckle. No other injuries were found on Martin's body at the time of his death. Physicians who reviewed the official autopsy report for the Orlando Sentinel stated in their opinion that Martin lived from 20 seconds to several minutes after he was shot, and that Martin likely remained conscious "for a little time, anyway".

The autopsy report stated that Martin had trace levels of THC, the active ingredient in marijuana, in his blood and urine. The toxicology report found the levels to be 1.5 nanograms/ml of THC and 7.3 nanograms/ml of THC-COOH, the main secondary metabolite of THC which stays in the system for weeks after cannabis has been smoked. Larry Kobilinsky, a professor of forensic science, stated that the THC amount was so low that it may have been ingested days earlier and played no role in Martin's behavior. While under oath, the medical examiner who performed the autopsy testified that "marijuana could have no effect or some effect" on Martin's behavior.

=== Witness accounts ===
9-1-1 calls
(start times are hr:min:sec p.m. EST)
7:16:11 "Help" and gunshot in background

7:16:41 reports screaming and gun shot

7:17:08 reports screaming "Help" and gunshot

7:17:15 distraught caller

7:17:54 reports gun shot

7:18:00 reports yelling "Help"

7:19:04 brother of caller was witness

Recordings of eight calls to the police made on the night of the shooting were released by the Sanford police on March 17, 2012.

The only eyewitness to the end of the confrontation stated that Martin was on top of Zimmerman and punching him, while Zimmerman was yelling for help. This witness, who identified himself as "John", stated that "The guy on the bottom, who had a red sweater on, was yelling to me, 'Help! Help!' and I told him to stop, and I was calling 911". He went on to say that when he got upstairs and looked down, "The guy who was on the top beating up the other guy, was the one laying in the grass, and I believe he was dead at that point."

A 13-year-old boy walking his dog saw a man on the ground shortly before the shooting and identified him as wearing red. His mother later disputed the testimony. She claimed that police pressured him into choosing the color that the man was wearing and that her son could not see any details in the dark. She also stated that police waited five days before requesting to question her son and said that the lead homicide investigator told her that he did not believe the shooting was self-defense.

Mary Cutcher and her roommate, Selma Mora Lamilla, appeared on AC 360, and Cutcher stated that she believes that "There was no punching, no hitting going on at the time, no wrestling" just prior to the shooting but admitted that she neither saw the shooting nor the preceding altercation. Cutcher and her roommate heard the pair in their backyard and a "very young voice" whining, with no sounds of a fight. They heard a gunshot; the crying stopped immediately, and they saw Zimmerman on his knees straddling Martin on the ground. Mary Cutcher phoned police after the fatal shooting and said the black man was standing over another man, although Trayvon Martin was already dead. According to the Orlando Sentinel article, "Police spokesman Sgt. Dave Morgenstern [on March 15] issued a statement disputing Cutcher's version of events, calling her statements to WFTV 'inconsistent with her sworn testimony to police'". However, Cutcher and her roommate maintain that their account of the incident to the police did not agree with Zimmerman's, and they demanded the police issue a retraction.

On March 29, 2012, an eyewitness, referred to as a male, said that he saw two men on the ground scuffling, then heard the shooting and saw Zimmerman walk away with no blood on him. The witness later appeared on AC360, referred to as a female, giving more details on her account. She pointed out that she heard an argument between a younger and an older voice. During the time that she witnessed the incident, the scuffling happened on the grass. She said that the larger man, who walked away after the gunshot, was on top and that it was too dark to see blood on his face.

A witness who arrived shortly after the shooting revealed photos that he took that night that showed "blood trickling down the back of Zimmerman's head from two cuts. It also shows a possible contusion forming on the crown of his head". In revealing the photo to ABC News in mid-April, he noted that he had heard but had not seen the scuffle, had been the first to arrive, and had been the first to talk to Zimmerman after the shooting.

One eyewitness statement given the night of the shooting describes "a black male, wearing a dark colored 'hoodie' on top of a white or Hispanic male who was yelling for help." The witness said that the black male was throwing punches "MMA [mixed martial arts] style". After hearing a "pop", he saw the black male "laid out on the grass". When the witness was subsequently interviewed weeks later by a different agency, the witness said he thought that the black male was either punching or pinning the lighter skinned male underneath him. He was no longer certain who was calling for help, having not seen their mouths in the dark. He was still certain that the black male had been on top of the lighter-skinned male.

On March 20, 2012, Martin family attorney Benjamin Crump revealed that Martin had been on the phone with a friend moments before he was shot. This friend later identified Zimmerman as the aggressor in the deadly confrontation. At Zimmerman's trial, this friend testified that she did not know whether Zimmerman or Martin started the fight. During an ABC News exclusive report, Crump allowed portions of his recorded interview with Martin's friend to be aired. She said that Martin told her that a man was watching him from his vehicle while talking on the phone before the man started following Martin. Martin told his friend at one point that he had lost the man but the man suddenly appeared again. The friend, originally known only as "Witness 8" (now known as Rachel Jeantel), said that she told Martin to run to the townhouse where he was staying with his father and his father's fiancée. She then heard Martin say, "What are you following me for?" followed by a man's voice responding, "What are you doing around here?" She testified that she then heard what sounded like Martin's phone earpiece dropping into wet grass, and she heard the sound of Martin's voice saying "Get off! Get off!" The phone then went dead, she said: "I was trying to say, 'Trayvon, Trayvon, what's going on'", Jeantel testified, "I started hearing a little of Trayvon saying 'Get off, get off', when the phone went silent". She immediately attempted to call him back, but was unable to reach him. Crump stated that he would turn the information over to the Justice Department because "the family does not trust the Sanford Police Department to have anything to do with the investigation." Martin's friend was subsequently interviewed by state prosecutors on April 2, 2012. During her interview with the prosecutor, Martin's friend recounted her last phone call with Martin and added that Martin had described the man as "crazy and creepy", watching him from a vehicle while the man was talking on the phone. She also testified that Martin referred to Zimmerman as a "creepy ass cracker" and "nigga" during their telephone conversation. On March 6, 2013, prosecutors admitted that she had lied under oath, when she falsely testified that she had been in the hospital on the day of Martin's funeral. She later admitted being embarrassed about lying and that she felt guilty about Martin's death and not doing more to help. Crump had refused to disclose the identity of Witness 8, stating that she was only 16, a minor at the time of the shooting, and asked the media to respect her privacy. It was subsequently revealed that she was actually 18 at the time when she said she was on the phone with Martin. According to the defense, her actual age had been edited out of previously released disclosures. Crump has denied intentionally giving any misleading statements about her age. Witness 8 was subsequently identified as Rachel Jeantel, a friend with whom Martin had attended elementary school and high school.

=== George Zimmerman's account of events ===
On the advice of his legal counsel, Zimmerman did not speak to the media after the shooting. The statements he gave to police investigators were publicly released on June 21, 2012, when Zimmerman's attorney, Mark O'Mara, published his written and recorded statements on Zimmerman's legal defense web site. Prior to the release of the statements, the only publicly available information about Zimmerman's version of the incident came from interviews with some of his family members and friends and from leaks to the news media by sources inside the investigation and his recorded phone call to the non-emergency number. Zimmerman maintained his public silence until he was interviewed by Sean Hannity of Fox News on July 18, 2012. According to early news reports on the incident, on the night of the shooting and afterwards, Zimmerman described in detail for investigators what took place.

Zimmerman said he was driving to the grocery store when he spotted Trayvon Martin walking through the neighborhood. Zimmerman's father said that, while his son was not on duty that night as Neighborhood Watch captain, there had been many break-ins and he thought it suspicious that someone he did not recognize was walking behind the town homes instead of on the street or the sidewalk. Zimmerman therefore called a non-emergency police line to report Martin's behavior and summon police. During the call, Zimmerman told the dispatcher that Martin was "coming to check me out." A source to the Orlando Sentinel said in May that Zimmerman told investigators that at one point Martin circled his vehicle, (Note: An Orlando Sentinel source reported in May 2012 that Zimmerman told investigators that Martin "was circling" his vehicle at one point, but news stories after Zimmerman's statements to police were released reported that he said Martin "circled" his vehicle.) and he rolled up his window to avoid a confrontation.

After telling the police dispatcher that Martin "ran", Zimmerman left his vehicle on Twin Trees and walked down the sidewalk between Twin Trees and Retreat View Circle to determine his location and ascertain in which direction Martin had fled. The dispatcher asked if Zimmerman was following Martin, and Zimmerman replied "Yeah." Then the dispatcher said, "OK, we don't need you to do that." Zimmerman replied with "OK" and stated that Martin got away. After a discussion about where Zimmerman would meet police, the call ended, and Zimmerman told investigators he was returning to his vehicle after locating an address on Retreat View Circle when Martin approached him from his left rear and confronted him. According to Zimmerman, Martin then punched him in the face, knocking him down, and began beating his head against the sidewalk. Zimmerman said he called out for help while being beaten, and at one point Martin covered his mouth to muffle the screams. According to Zimmerman's father, during the struggle while Martin was on top of Zimmerman, Martin saw the gun Zimmerman was carrying and said something to the effect of "You're gonna die now" or "You're gonna die tonight" and continued to beat Zimmerman. Zimmerman and Martin struggled over the gun, and Zimmerman shot Martin once in the chest at close range. Zimmerman told police he shot Martin in self-defense. (Note: Some referenced information is from the embedded video of Robert Zimmerman's interview.)

On June 21, 2012, Zimmerman's attorneys released audiotapes of several interviews he had with police shortly after the shooting. Also included were Zimmerman's written statement of February 26, 2012, and video recordings of his reenactment of the incident and a voice stress test that he passed.

In the interviews, Zimmerman says he took note of Martin because he was near a home that he had previously called police about. He also said, "He was just walking casually, not like he was trying to get out of the rain" and he felt "something was off" about Martin.

In a reconstruction video-recorded by police the next day, Zimmerman said that after he initially saw Martin on Retreat View Circle he parked his vehicle in front of the club house at the corner of Retreat View Circle and Twin Trees Lane and observed Martin go past him and onto Twin Trees Lane where he lost sight of Martin. He stated the dispatcher asked "Can you get to somewhere where you can see him?" and that he then left the club house parking lot and drove onto Twin Trees Lane where he parked. He further stated that at one point Martin circled his truck while he was parked on Twin Trees Lane.

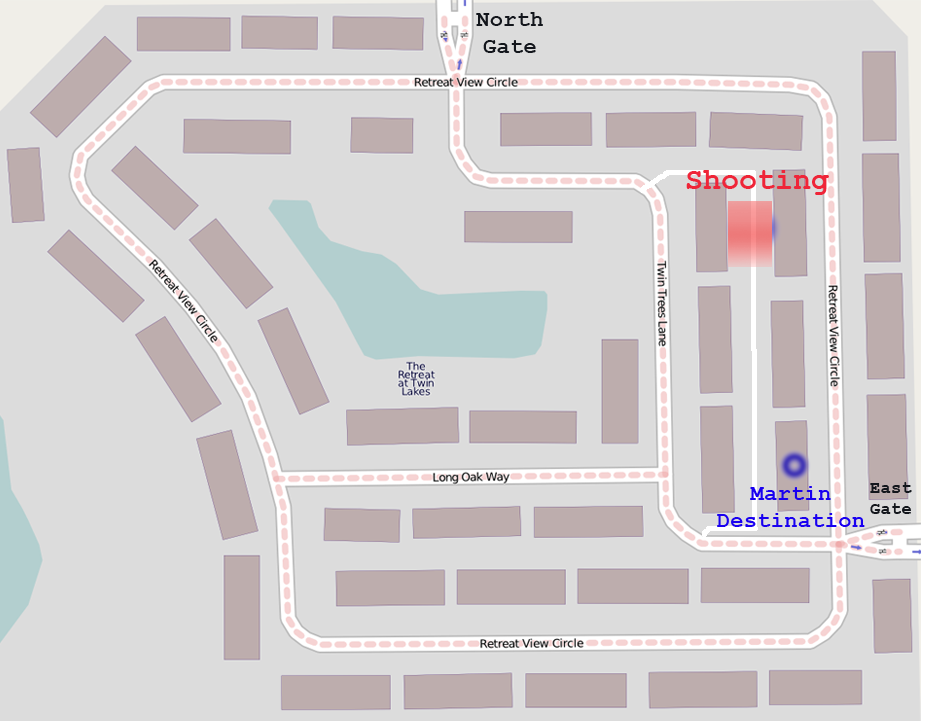
Shooting of Trayvon Martin map

Zimmerman eventually left his truck and walked down the sidewalk between Twin Trees Lane to Retreat View Circle and gave police an address on Retreat View Circle. He told investigators that he was not following Martin but was "just going in the same direction he was" to find an address, but admitted that he had also left his truck to try to see in which direction Martin had gone. The altercation began, he said, when Martin suddenly appeared while Zimmerman was walking back to his vehicle. He described Martin at different points in the interviews as appearing "out of nowhere", "from the darkness", and as "jump[ing] out of the bushes". Zimmerman said that Martin asked, "You got a fucking problem, homie?" Zimmerman replied no, then Martin said "You got a problem now," and punched Zimmerman. As they struggled on the ground, Zimmerman on his back with Martin on top of him, Zimmerman yelled for help "probably 50 times". (See Background yells for help in 9-1-1 calls) Martin told him to "Shut the fuck up," as he hit him in the face and pounded his head on a concrete sidewalk. When Zimmerman tried to move off the concrete, Martin saw his gun and said, "You're going to die tonight, motherfucker!" Martin grabbed for the gun, but Zimmerman grabbed it first. He said after firing his weapon at Martin, he was not sure at first that he had hit him, so he got on top of him in order to subdue him. Bystanders and police arrived shortly after Martin was shot.

Police reports state Zimmerman "appeared to have a broken and a bloody nose and swelling of his face". Zimmerman was offered three chances to be taken to the hospital but declined each time, according to police reports released by the prosecution. ABC News reported that a medical report compiled by Zimmerman's family physician showed that, following the altercation with Martin, Zimmerman was diagnosed with a closed fracture of his nose, two black eyes, lacerations to the back of his head, a minor back injury, and bruising in his upper lip and cheek.

In the course of Zimmerman's recorded interviews, Detective Chris Serino questioned aspects of Zimmerman's account, such as Zimmerman's statement that he didn't know the name of a street in the Twin Lakes community where he had lived for three years. Zimmerman said in response that he had a bad memory and takes medication for attention deficit hyperactivity disorder. Investigators also questioned the extent of his injuries and why he didn't identify himself to Martin as a Neighborhood Watch coordinator. Zimmerman said he didn't want to confront Martin.

Mother Jones reported that in the video reenactment, Zimmerman contradicted his previous written account of the altercation. In his written statement, Zimmerman claimed that after being punched by Martin, he instantly fell onto his back. In the video reenactment, Zimmerman instead claimed that after being punched he tried "to push [Martin] away from [him]" and moved farther down the path instead of falling instantly.

On June 26, 2012, the prosecution released the results of a voice stress test performed on George Zimmerman the day after the shooting. Zimmerman was asked, "Did you confront the guy you shot?" to which Zimmerman answered, "No." Zimmerman was asked, "Were you in fear for your life, when you shot the guy?" to which Zimmerman answered, "Yes." The examiner concluded that Zimmerman "told substantially the complete truth" in the examination, and Zimmerman was classified as "No Deception Indicated (NDI)" according to the report. Voice stress analysis is a controversial product because of the "scientific implausibility" of its principles and "ungrounded claims of the aggressive propaganda from sellers of voice stress analysis gadgets".

During a bond hearing on April 20, 2012, Investigator Dale Gilbreath testified under oath that he did not know whether Zimmerman or Martin started the fight and that there is no evidence to contradict Zimmerman's claim that he was walking back to his vehicle when Martin confronted him. Gilbreath, however, questioned Zimmerman's statement that Martin was slamming his head against the sidewalk just before he shot the teenager, saying it was "not consistent with the evidence we found." Gilbreath was one of two investigators who attested to the facts stated in the probable cause affidavit.

==== Zimmerman's first media interview ====
On July 18, 2012, Zimmerman, accompanied by his attorney Mark O'Mara, gave his first long media interview to Sean Hannity, and part of the interview appeared on Hannity that evening. During the interview, Zimmerman said that he did not regret his actions on the night of the shooting and that he felt that what had happened "was all God's plan". However, towards the end of the interview, he backtracked and said, "I do wish there was something, anything I could have done that wouldn't have put me in the position where I had to take his life. I want to tell everyone, my wife, my family, my parents, grandmother, the Martins, the city of Sanford and America: I'm sorry that this happened. I'm truly sorry."

When Hannity asked Zimmerman why his suspicions were aroused when he noticed Martin, Zimmerman replied in part:

I felt he was suspicious because it was raining. He was in-between houses, cutting in-between houses, and he was walking very leisurely for the weather.... It didn't look like he was a resident that went to check their mail and got caught in the rain and was hurrying back home. He didn't look like a fitness fanatic that would train in the rain.

Following the interview with Hannity, Special Prosecutor Angela Corey filed formal notice that she intended to use the interview as evidence against Zimmerman. According to an article in the Orlando Sentinel, Zimmerman's story differed in at least two details from previous versions of what he said happened the night he shot Martin—specifically, that he told Hannity he had walked toward Martin because he was trying to find a street address to provide the police, but during the police's investigation he had said that the reason he approached Martin was that he was looking for the name of the street, which he had forgotten; and that he told Hannity that Martin had been "skipping, going away quickly", not running away out of fear, but he had previously told Sanford police that Martin had run away as Zimmerman was reporting him.

Florida defense lawyers said it was a mistake for Zimmerman to do a television interview and discuss what happened that night. One of them said, "It's really baffling what he thought he'd gain from it. I question who's in charge of the defense strategy, Zimmerman or O'Mara". O'Mara told reporters that the interview was intended to help increase the number of donations to Zimmerman's nearly exhausted legal defense fund, which would pay the costs for Zimmerman's legal defense as well as for shelter and security. O'Mara said that Zimmerman had promised Hannity three months earlier that he would give his first interview to Hannity, and that Hannity had agreed to promote Zimmerman's website during the interview, although he said Hannity did not. ABC News' Barbara Walters also said that Zimmerman was in desperate need of money and was worried about the safety of his family. She had flown from New York to Florida to record a television interview with Zimmerman that was to be shown following the Hannity interview, but the television network refused to meet Zimmerman's request that they pay for a month's hotel stay and security for his wife.

Martin's parents said they did not accept Zimmerman's apology for killing their son. Martin's mother, Sybrina Fulton, said she doubted that Zimmerman's apology was sincere. "I have a hard time accepting it because he also said that he doesn't regret anything that he did that night," Fulton stated.

=== Affidavit of probable cause ===
On April 11, 2012, an affidavit of probable cause was filed in support of second-degree murder charges against Zimmerman. The affidavit described what investigators alleged took place between Zimmerman and Martin on the night of the shooting.

Prosecutors alleged that Zimmerman profiled Martin as he was walking back from a nearby 7-Eleven store to the townhouse where he was temporarily living. Prosecutors said Zimmerman was driving in his vehicle when he saw Martin and assumed he was a criminal and perceived that Martin was acting suspicious and felt that he did not belong in the gated community. Zimmerman called the police, and prosecutors said the dispatcher told Zimmerman an officer was on the way and to wait for him. In the call, Zimmerman made reference to people he felt had gotten away with break-ins in the neighborhood. (Note: While talking about Martin, Zimmerman stated "these assholes, they always get away" and also said "these fucking punks".)

Investigators alleged that while Zimmerman was talking to the dispatcher, Martin was on the phone with a friend and she said that Martin was scared because he was being followed by an unknown man. Investigators said that Martin attempted to run home, but Zimmerman followed him because he didn't want Martin to get away. When the police dispatcher realized Zimmerman was following Martin, he told Zimmerman that was unnecessary and that police would meet him there. Prosecutors alleged that Zimmerman ignored the dispatcher and continued following Martin and confronted him and a struggle ensued. When police arrived at the scene, Zimmerman admitted to shooting Martin in the chest.

==== Analysis of charges ====
Legal analysts criticized the prosecution for over-charging Zimmerman, claiming that the probable cause affidavit did not support a charge of second-degree murder. Harvard Law Professor Alan Dershowitz claimed the affidavit may have been perjurious if Special Prosecutor Angela Corey knowingly omitted facts favorable to Zimmerman's self-defense claim.

Richard Kuritz, a former prosecutor who worked with Angela Corey, said the state attorney had no obligation to include exculpatory evidence in the affidavit. He stated that Dershowitz could face civil action for making accusations that Corey committed a crime. "To suggest that she's committing any crime, Dershowitz is way off on that", Kuritz said.

=== Background yells for help in 9-1-1 calls ===
In recordings of the 9-1-1 calls, yells for help are audible in the background. Zimmerman's family says it was Zimmerman yelling for help, Martin's family says it was Martin yelling for help, and independent audio analysts offer differing opinions as to who was yelling for help. During the trial, friends and family members of both Zimmerman and Martin testified as to who they thought the voice was, but expert testimony regarding voice identification was not allowed.

In an interview with prosecutors on March 19, Zimmerman's father identified the yells as George Zimmerman's, stating, "There is no doubt who is yelling for help. It is absolutely my son." Other relatives of Zimmerman, including his brother, concur and are equally adamant. During a bond hearing on June 29, the 9-1-1 recording was played in court, and Zimmerman's father testified that "It was definitely George's" voice heard yelling for help in the recorded 9-1-1 call.

According to police reports, after listening to audio recordings of the 9-1-1 calls, Martin's father, Tracy Martin, told police investigators that it was not Trayvon Martin's voice yelling for help. Martin has since told reporters he was uncertain at that time, but that when he heard an enhanced recording on March 16 he was convinced it was his son yelling for help. Investigators interviewed Martin's mother, Sybrina Fulton, who reviewed the 9-1-1 calls to police and identified the voice crying for help as her son. Investigators also interviewed Martin's cousin who stated that without a doubt "on a stack of bibles" it was Martin yelling for help on the 9-1-1 tape.

Zimmerman's attorneys requested a Frye hearing regarding the admissibility of the testimony of the audio analysts, to determine if the methods used by them are generally accepted by the scientific community. The judge said in her ruling that, "There is no evidence to establish that their scientific techniques have been tested and found reliable." Her ruling did not prevent the 9-1-1 calls from being played at trial.

== Shooting aftermath ==
=== Martin family response ===
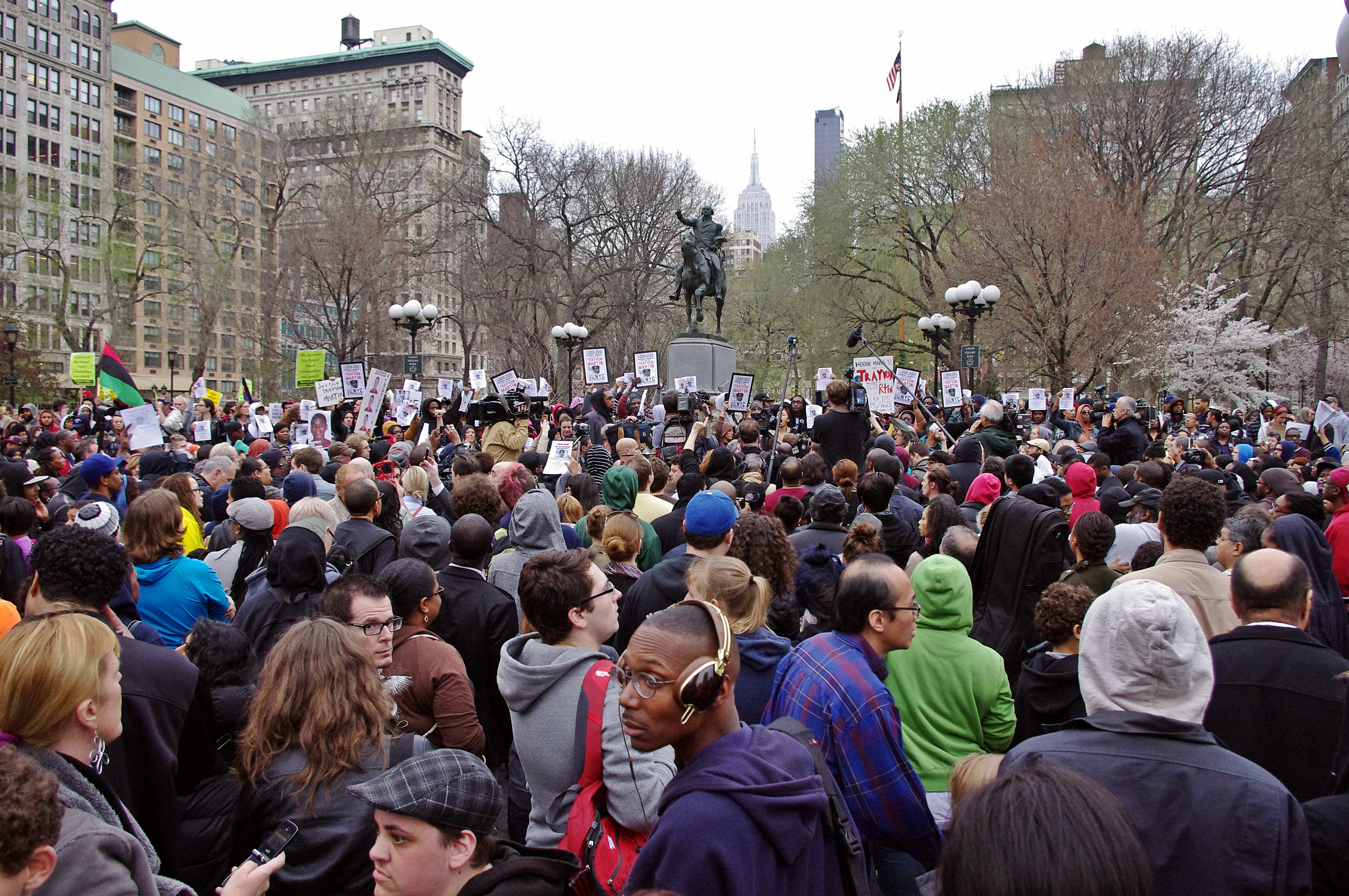
Supporters of Trayvon Martin rally in Union Square during a "Million Hoodie March" in Manhattan on March 21. Martin's parents addressed the crowd.

Tracy Martin doubted the account of his son's death told to him by Sanford police investigators and believed Zimmerman did not act in self-defense. Two days after the shooting, he was referred to civil rights attorney Benjamin Crump, who was retained to pursue legal action and to persuade the news media to cover the case. Attorney Natalie Jackson and publicist Ryan Julison, both of Orlando, also joined the Martin team. Due to their efforts, the case started to receive national attention on March 7. On March 9, Crump announced he was suing to have 911 calls from the night of the shooting made public. They were released by the Sanford mayor on March 16. As attention to the case grew, Tracy Martin and Sybrina Fulton gave media interviews and appeared at some of the protests being held which called for Zimmerman's arrest.

On April 5, 2013, more than a year after the shooting, it was reported that the Martin family had settled a wrongful death claim against the Retreat at Twin Lakes Homeowners Association. The details of the agreement were sealed under court order, and the amount of the settlement was not disclosed, but the Orlando Sentinel claimed that the sum was thought to be more than $1 million.

On June 28, in an interview with CNN conducted during the trial of George Zimmerman, Alicia Stanley, Trayvon Martin's step-mother (Trayvon's father's former wife), stated that she believed Zimmerman had profiled Trayvon as a criminal, although she was not convinced that the profiling was based on race. She said that she had no doubt that Zimmerman had started the fight and that Martin had reacted only in self-defense.

=== Zimmerman and family ===
While the shooting was being investigated, Zimmerman, his wife, and his parents went into hiding due to threats they were receiving as the case gained more attention. Zimmerman left his job, and his school expelled him, citing safety concerns.

On April 9, Zimmerman placed a self-created web site on the internet, which included some brief statements, but no information about the shooting, since he had been advised by legal counsel not to discuss it. He also solicited donations for living expenses and legal defense costs.

After taking over as Zimmerman's defense counsel on April 11, Mark O'Mara took down Zimmerman's self-created web site and replaced it with a professional information site. He arranged for a second web site to be set up to collect donations overseen by an independent third party. Following Zimmerman's April 20 bond hearing, he and his wife were accused by prosecutors of not disclosing the funds raised through the original web site; as a result of these allegations, Zimmerman's original bail was revoked. He was subsequently released again with a higher bail amount. Zimmerman's wife, Shellie Zimmerman, was charged with felony perjury in June 2012. She pleaded guilty to misdemeanor perjury on August 28, 2013, as part of a plea deal and was sentenced to 100 hours of community service and one year of probation, as well as writing a letter of apology to Judge Kenneth Lester Jr. The conviction will be expunged at the end of her probation period.

George Zimmerman's defense team had set up a Twitter account, a Facebook page and a website with a defense fund registered with the Florida Division of Consumer Services. After three months, the Facebook page was shut down by O'Mara, because he said it was leading to unhelpful discussions.

In July 2012, Zimmerman reactivated his original website, and his parents also created their own website. Both sites discuss how the case has changed the Zimmermans' lives and seek donations for living expenses.

On January 30, 2013, Zimmerman's attorney, Mark O'Mara, asked on Zimmerman's defense fund website for the public to donate more money. O'Mara stated that Zimmerman's legal defense could cost up to $1 million.

== Public response ==
After the shooting, Zimmerman was criticized by the Martin family and in the media for following Martin and for carrying a weapon. Sanford police chief Bill Lee stated that neighborhood watch volunteers are not encouraged to carry a gun but have a Constitutional right to do so. Lee further stated, "Mr. Zimmerman was not acting outside the legal boundaries of Florida Statute by carrying his weapon when this incident occurred." Sanford Police volunteer program coordinator Wendy Dorival told the Miami Herald that she met Zimmerman in September 2011 at a community neighborhood watch presentation, and recalls advising: "If it's someone you don't recognize, call us. We'll figure it out.... Observe from a safe location". The director of the National Sheriffs' Association (NSA) said Zimmerman's "alleged action ... significantly contradicts the principles of the Neighborhood Watch Program". The Neighborhood Watch program that employed Zimmerman was overseen by the local police department rather than the NSA.

Protests were staged around the U.S. prior to Zimmerman's April 11 indictment on murder charges. Over 2.2 million signatures were collected on a Change.org petition created by Martin's mother calling for Zimmerman's arrest. It was the website's largest petition ever.

Since Martin was killed while wearing a hoodie, hoodies were used as a sign of protest over the handling of the case. Additionally, some professional athletes, including Carmelo Anthony, Dwyane Wade, LeBron James, and the entire Miami Heat roster, donned hoodies in Martin's honor.

Bags of Skittles candy and cans of Arizona Iced Tea were also used as protest symbols. Martin was reported to be returning from a 7-Eleven convenience store with these items when he was shot, although the beverage he purchased was actually a can of Arizona Watermelon Fruit Juice Cocktail.

Walkouts were staged by students at over a dozen Florida high schools, and thousands of people attended rallies around the country to demand Zimmerman's arrest. Members of the Occupy movement marched in solidarity during the "Million Hoodie March."

A number of high-profile citizens made public comments or released statements calling for a full investigation, including Reverend Al Sharpton, Reverend Jesse Jackson, and President Barack Obama.

Speaking on the day of Zimmerman's arrest, Al Sharpton said, "Forty-five days ago, Trayvon Martin was murdered. No arrest was made. The Chief of Police in Sanford announced after his review of the evidence there would be no arrest. An outcry from all over this country came because his parents refused to leave it there." Jesse Jackson also referred to Martin as "murdered and martyred". And U.S. Rep. Frederica Wilson (Dem.), who represents Martin's hometown of Miami, used the word "murdered" when she referred to Martin's fatal shooting.

President Obama, speaking to reporters on March 23 after federal investigators were deployed to Sanford, said, "When I think about this boy, I think about my own kids, and I think every parent in America should be able to understand why it is absolutely imperative that we investigate every aspect of this.... If I had a son, he would look like Trayvon."

Former education secretary William Bennett criticized what he called a "mob mentality", saying that "... the tendency in the first days by some, including Al Sharpton, Jesse Jackson and an angry chorus of followers, was to rush to judgment with little regard for fairness, due process, or respect for the terrible death of a young man".

According to Zimmerman's father, George Zimmerman received death threats after the shooting and was forced to move out of his home. The New Black Panther Party offered a $10,000 reward for the "capture" of George Zimmerman; this was condemned by the city of Sanford.

In parts of the U.S., various acts of vandalism, assaults and crimes were connected in part to alleged revenge for the shooting of Trayvon Martin.

Professor Alan Dershowitz criticized the probable cause affidavit against Zimmerman as "so thin that it won't make it past the judge", calling it "irresponsible and unethical", and opined that the charges were motivated by prosecutor Corey's desire to be re-elected. The deadline for qualifying to run against Corey was 9 days after she filed charges, and no one stepped forward to challenge her, so she won re-election. In June, Dershowitz said that Corey had contacted the dean of Harvard Law School about his remarks, threatening to sue Dershowitz for libel and slander, and the school too, and saying she wanted him to be disciplined by the American Bar Association. Dershowitz said the dean defended his remarks under academic freedom and further commented that "Even if Angela Corey's actions were debatable, which I believe they were not, I certainly have the right, as a professor who has taught and practiced criminal law nearly 50 years, to express a contrary view." CNN legal analyst Mark NeJame expressed concern over Corey's threats and questioned if the prosecution of Zimmerman was for political reasons.

Fox News Channel host Geraldo Rivera claimed that Martin's "gangsta-style clothing" was "as much responsible for Trayvon Martin's death as George Zimmerman was". Rivera was quoted saying, "I am urging the parents of black and Latino youngsters particularly to not let their children go out wearing hoodies." Faced with outrage over his statements, Rivera apologized, saying that he had "obscured the main point that someone shot and killed an unarmed teenager". When a 7-Eleven surveillance video showing Martin making a purchase on the night of the shooting was released two months later, however, Rivera referred to the clothes he had been wearing as "thug wear." His comments were criticized by the Martin family attorney, Benjamin Crump, who compared them to people blaming rape victims for wearing short skirts.

Bill O'Reilly of Fox News called for restraint and urged other pundits to stop trying the case in the media. He said that the case is a "tragedy" but should not be tried in the media.

After Zimmerman's bond was revoked for misrepresenting how much money he had when his bond was set, Martin family attorney Benjamin Crump said he expected the prosecution to bring Zimmerman's credibility "front and center in this entire case". Zimmerman's attorney, Mark O'Mara, stated that it was a "mistake" that had "undermined his credibility, which he will have to work to repair".

== Alleged race issues ==
=== Allegations against Zimmerman ===
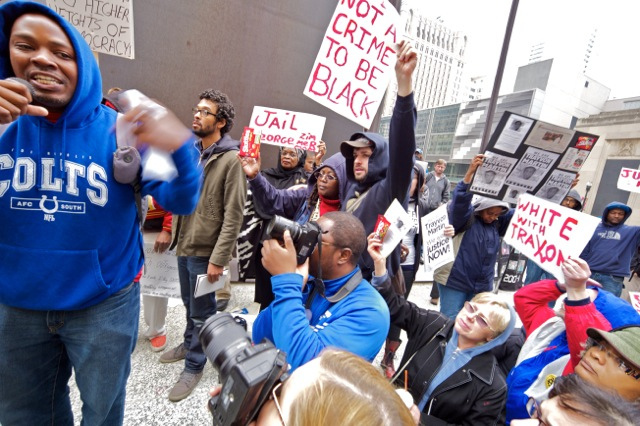
Chicago protestors on March 28, 2012

Zimmerman was accused of being motivated by racism and of having racially profiled Martin. During early media coverage of the incident, Zimmerman's call to the police dispatcher was deceptively edited by NBC making it appear Zimmerman had volunteered Martin's race. The unedited audio recording proved that the police dispatcher asked about Martin's race, and only then did Zimmerman reveal that Martin was black. NBC apologized for the misleading edit and disciplined those involved, including firing the producer who was responsible for the deceptive edit to the 911 call.

==== Defense of Zimmerman's character ====
In an open letter on March 15, 2012, Zimmerman's father, Robert Zimmerman, defended his son against allegations that his actions were racially motivated, stating that Zimmerman was Hispanic, was raised in a multiracial family, and "would be the last to discriminate for any reason whatsoever", saying that the portrayal of his son as a racist "could not be further from the truth". Just as George Zimmerman's trial was set to begin, Robert Zimmerman published an e-book about the case in which he said that prior to the shooting, he had generally believed racism was no longer much of a problem and that he had personally not experienced much racism, despite being married to a Hispanic woman, but that since the shooting he had found that racism is "flourishing at the insistence of some in the African American Community". In a chapter called "Who are the True Racists?", Robert Zimmerman listed a host of African Americans he says are racist, including the Congressional Black Caucus, the National Association for the Advancement of Colored People, the National Basketball Players Association, the National Organization of Black Law Enforcement Executives, the National Black Chamber of Commerce, and the United Negro College Fund, among others.

According to George Zimmerman's family, some of Zimmerman's relatives are Black. Zimmerman's former lawyer Craig Sonner stated that Zimmerman is not a racist, and that he had mentored black youths in the past. Joe Oliver, a former television news reporter who is acquainted with Zimmerman, noted "I'm a black male, and all that I know is that George has never given me any reason whatsoever to believe he has anything against people of color."

In early April, an anonymous letter to the NAACP, which was signed "A Concerned Zimmerman Family Member" said Zimmerman had been one of the few to take any action to protest the 2010 beating of Sherman Ware, a black homeless man, by the son of a Sanford police officer. Zimmerman's father confirmed his son's efforts on Ware's behalf.

In May, the Miami Herald secured an audiotape of the January 8, 2011, Sanford City Hall community forum. On the audiotape, Zimmerman was heard criticizing the conduct of the Sanford Police Department in the Ware case. Zimmerman criticized former chief, Brian Tooley, and said Tooley had engaged in a "cover-up" and that he should lose his pension. He also said he'd been on ride-alongs with Sanford police where he found them to be lazy. The Herald also reported that it had contacted five out of six Black churches where Zimmerman was reported to have distributed fliers on the Ware beating, however no one recalled receiving them.

On July 12, 2012, reports of some of the more than 30 interviews conducted by the FBI were publicly released. Sanford Police investigator Chris Serino told FBI agents that he believed Zimmerman's actions were not based on Martin's race. Zimmerman's neighbors had nothing derogatory to say about him, and his co-workers were complimentary.

=== Allegations against Martin ===
During the trial, defense attorney Don West implied that the language Martin had allegedly used was evidence that Martin had introduced race into the confrontation. State's Witness 8, Rachel Jeantel, testified that Martin, during his telephone conversation with her just prior to the shooting, had referred to Zimmerman as a "creepy-ass cracker". On cross-examination, West asked Jeantel, "So it was racial, but it was because Trayvon Martin put race in this?" and "You don't think that 'creepy ass cracker' is a racial comment?" Jeantel replied that she believed race was involved because Martin was being followed by a white man, not because Martin had called Zimmerman a "creepy-ass cracker." She said that people in her community call white people "cracker" and she did not find the term offensive. Jeantel also testified that Martin, during his telephone conversation, referred to Zimmerman as a "nigga." Jeantel said that Martin's use of the word "nigga" to describe Zimmerman was "slang" when asked by lead prosecutor Bernie De La Rionda.

=== Allegations against the Sanford police ===
For not arresting Zimmerman, the Sanford police faced heavy criticism, protests, and allegations of racial bias. The NAACP wrote U.S. Attorney General Eric Holder expressing "no confidence that, absent federal oversight, the Sanford Police Department will devote the necessary degree of care to its investigation" and requesting that personnel be detailed to Sanford to review the case without bias. Lee repeatedly defended the investigation, stating that the Sanford police did not feel they had conducted a racially biased investigation and welcomed a review of their efforts.

Allegations were also made that the Sanford police were protecting Zimmerman. Lee told reporters that they could not arrest Zimmerman because no evidence contradicted his story, and that to do so would leave the police open to litigation. In regards to the 9-1-1 dispatcher telling Zimmerman that "We don't need you to [follow him]", Lee said "That is a call taker making a recommendation to him. He's not under a legal obligation to do that, so that is not something we can charge him with."

On March 21, 2012, three out of the five members of the Sanford City Commission, including the mayor, passed a motion of no confidence in regards to the Police Chief Bill Lee and his handling of the case; however, the vote was advisory only. The following day, Lee announced that he had temporarily stepped down from his position as chief of police, stating, "My involvement in this matter is overshadowing the process." Lee further stated, "I do this in the hopes of restoring some semblance of calm to a city which has been in turmoil for several weeks." On April 23, 2012, the City of Sanford announced that Police Chief Bill Lee would resign but city commissioners voted to reject the resignation. Some commissioners had concerns about the fairness of Lee losing his job and the mayor stated he preferred to wait for the results of an investigation. Lee was to remain on paid leave.

In an interview with CNN, following his testimony at Zimmerman's trial, Bill Lee said that he felt pressure from city officials to arrest Zimmerman to placate the public rather than as a matter of justice. Lee said, "It was relayed to me that they just wanted an arrest. They didn't care if it got dismissed later." Lee further stated in the interview that the Sanford Police conducted a "sound" investigation, and the evidence provided no probable cause to arrest Zimmerman at the scene. Lee said that the police needed to do a job, and there was some outside, and inside influence, that "forced a change in the course of the normal criminal justice process." The former police chief said the investigation was taken away from us and "we weren't able to complete it." Lee also said that his lead investigator made a recommendation that Zimmerman be charged with manslaughter, as a matter of protocol. The Sanford police presented a "capias request" to the state's attorney, asking that they determine whether it was a "justifiable homicide".

== "Stand your ground" laws ==
The Zimmerman defense team initially planned to seek to dismiss the case against Zimmerman under the protection afforded by Florida's "Stand Your Ground" self-defense law. The controversial law, passed in 2005, permits the use of deadly force when someone reasonably feels they are at risk of great bodily harm in a confrontation. Zimmerman's defense team ultimately did not seek a pretrial hearing for immunity from prosecution based on the Stand Your Ground law. However, as required by the Stand Your Ground provision of the law, during the trial the judge instructed the jurors that Zimmerman had had no duty to retreat and had had a right to stand his ground and use deadly force if he reasonably believed doing so was necessary to defend himself. Prior to the passage of Florida's Stand Your Ground law, the standard jury instructions from the judge would have included a statement that a person had a duty to attempt to retreat using "every reasonable means" before using deadly force.

Self-defense laws in the United States, particularly regarding justifiable homicide, vary by state. In many states, such laws exempt people in their own homes from the common-law requirement that one first attempt to retreat, if one can safely do so, before resorting to the use of deadly force (the so-called "castle doctrine", based on the notion that "a person's home is his castle"). Florida's stand your ground law extends the no-retreat doctrine to vehicles and public places. At the time of Martin's shooting, 22 other states had adopted similar stand your ground laws.

Three weeks after the shooting, Florida Governor Rick Scott commissioned a 19-member task force to review the Florida statute that deals with justifiable use of force, including the Stand Your Ground provision. After holding seven public hearings around the state, and reviewing more than 11,000 comments submitted by the public—nearly three times as many of which were opposed to the law as were in support of it, (Note: The full tally is available) the task force recommended against repealing the statute, saying that Florida residents have a right to defend themselves with deadly force without a duty to retreat if they feel threatened. (Note: The task force's final report is available at) Critics said that the members appointed to the task force had been chosen to heavily bias the panel against any significant changes in the law, and that, as a result, the panel's conclusions were no surprise. The task force did suggest that law enforcement agencies and the courts increase training on the self-defense law to ensure the law is applied fairly and that the legislature more clearly define the role of neighborhood watch participants to avoid vigilantism and fund a study of how the law had been applied, examining effects such as race, ethnicity, and gender. However, the task force largely rejected recommendations of Miami-Dade County State Attorney Katherine Fernandez-Rundle (one of the task force members) that would have restricted the law, including a recommendation to limit immunity from prosecution to defendants who have not provoked a confrontation. In January 2013, Martin's mother joined two Democratic lawmakers in Florida and called for the repeal of the state's "stand your ground" law. Several bills subsequently introduced in the Republican-controlled legislature's 2013 session proposing to repeal or revise the Stand Your Ground provisions of the law died without committee hearings.

Several months following Zimmerman's acquittal, in October 2013 bills to revise Florida's Stand Your Ground law provisions in accordance with several of the suggestions offered in 2012 by the governor's task force began advancing through the Florida Legislature with bipartisan support. A proposal offered by State Senator David Simmons, a Republican who had served on the governor's task force and who had been a principal author of the original law, and State Senator Chris Smith, the Democratic senate minority leader, would clarify language in the law to deny aggressors in a confrontation from being able to claim immunity under the law, would allow innocent bystanders harmed by a person standing their ground to sue for negligence, and would require the establishment of guidelines and training protocols for neighborhood watch programs that would restrict neighborhood watch volunteers to only observing and reporting. The proposal was received favorably by the Florida Department of Law Enforcement, the Florida Sheriffs Association, the state public defenders association, and the NAACP, although several Republican state legislators voted to block the bill's passage and gun rights advocates expressed opposition to several of the proposals. The Dream Defenders, who several weeks earlier had occupied the state capitol demanding that the legislature take up debate on the Stand Your Ground law, said the bill did not go far enough and urged the legislature to repeal the law entirely.

== Media coverage ==
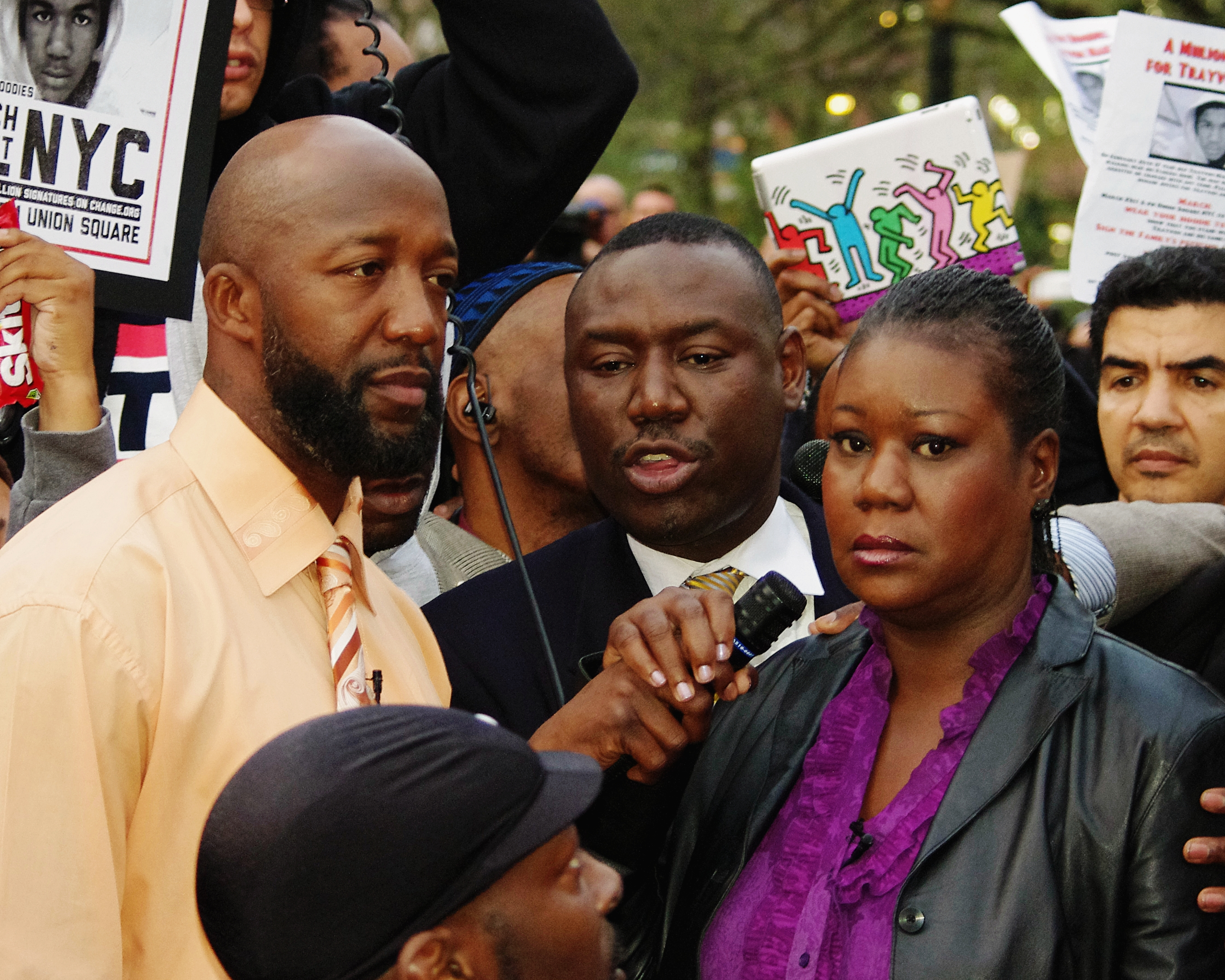
Trayvon's father Tracy Martin, family attorney Benjamin Crump and mother Sybrina Fulton, at the 'Million Hoodies' protest in Union Square, New York

For the first 10 days after Martin's death, the story was covered only by local media outlets in Florida. In order to bring more attention to the case, Martin family attorney Natalie Jackson sought the assistance of publicist Ryan Julison on March 5.

On March 7, 2012, Reuters covered the story, and the following day, CBS News, acting on a tip it received from the network's local bureau in Atlanta, Georgia, obtained an exclusive interview with Tracy Martin and Sybrina Fulton that was broadcast on CBS This Morning.

Also on March 8, The Huffington Post, The Young Turks, and TheGrio.com, which is affiliated with NBC News, started to cover the case. On March 9, 2012, ABC World News featured the story on their nightly broadcast. CNN first reported on the case on March 12, 2012, and by the end of that week, radio hosts and bloggers were also reporting on the story. National coverage started to increase the week of March 12 and intensified after March 16, when tapes of 9-1-1 calls were released to the public. Having the 9-1-1 calls, which the police had previously declined to release, gave radio and TV reporters more material on which to report.

The Project for Excellence in Journalism reported that media coverage of the Trayvon Martin case became the first story in 2012 to be featured more than the presidential race. According to the Project, the varying types of media have focused on the case in different ways. An article in the Tampa Bay Times wrote that, "On Twitter, people are outraged at Zimmerman and want justice, while on cable news and talk radio people are discussing the state's laws for self-defense and gun control and on blogs the focus has been on race."

Fox News host Geraldo Rivera, a former NBC employee, asserted that MSNBC "made an ideological decision that... they would argue strenuously for the prosecution of George Zimmerman and the ultimate conviction of George Zimmerman... [T]hey are cheerleading for the conviction of George Zimmerman."

=== Portrayals of Martin and Zimmerman ===
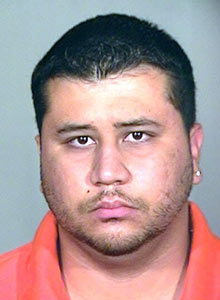
George Zimmerman in a 2005 mug shot

The contrast in the photos of Martin and of Zimmerman which were most widely used in early media reports of the shooting may have influenced initial public perceptions of the case. The most commonly published image of Martin, provided to media by his family, showed a smiling "baby-faced" teen. (Note: Some sources said the Martin image shows him at 13 or 14 years old, but a Martin family attorney, Benjamin Crump, reportedly said that the photograph had been taken six months prior to the shooting, when Martin was 16 years old. Contributing to the controversy was an image of a different person also named Trayvon Martin in a "gangsta" pose.) The only image of Zimmerman initially available to news media was a 7-year-old police booking photograph released by law enforcement officials after the shooting. The image showed a heavy-set Zimmerman who appeared to be unhappy or angry, with an imposing stare. The AP quoted academic Kenny Irby on the expected effect, "When you have such a lopsided visual comparison, it just stands to reason that people would rush to judgment," and another academic, Betsi Grabe, as saying that journalists will present stories as a struggle between good and evil "[i]f the ingredients are there."

=== Zimmerman's ethnicity ===
The initial police report on the shooting described Zimmerman as white. Early news media reports which mentioned Zimmerman's race also referred to him as white. Although Zimmerman had personally identified as Hispanic on his voting records and driver's license, this information was not revealed to the public in early media reports, when Zimmerman had gone into hiding and no one was speaking to the media on his behalf. That changed when Zimmerman's father delivered a statement to the Orlando Sentinel calling Zimmerman "a Spanish-speaking minority." Several media outlets, such as CNN and The New York Times, subsequently began describing Zimmerman as a "white Hispanic" in their reports on the case, prompting discussion, and some criticism, of the choice of that term. Conservative commentators, including Rush Limbaugh and Bernard Goldberg, accused the media of misrepresenting Zimmerman's race to fit a political narrative of a racially motivated killing. Goldberg opined that "If George Zimmerman did something good ... they wouldn't refer to him as white Hispanic, he'd just be Hispanic." Other commentators remarked on the difficulty of deciding how best to describe Zimmerman's race in media reports intended for audiences largely unfamiliar with the complexity of Hispanic identity in contemporary America. Michael Getler, the ombudsman for PBS, said that after reviewing viewers' criticism of the PBS NewsHour's having called Zimmerman "white" in an April 2012 broadcast, the NewsHour staff suggested that it might be best in future reports to simply show an image of Zimmerman and not try to describe him.

=== Zimmerman's call to police ===
Economist and commentator Thomas Sowell criticized the national media for implying that Zimmerman had continued to follow Martin after the police dispatcher said, "We don't need you to do that." He said that they mostly left out Zimmerman's answer, "OK," because "too many people in the media see their role as filtering and slanting the news."

After the audio of the call was released, reports by CNN and other news outlets alleged that Zimmerman had said "fucking coons" two minutes and twenty-one seconds (2:21) into the call. Two weeks later on April 4, 2012, CNN claimed that enhanced audio revealed that Zimmerman had said "fucking cold" (alluding to ongoing rain in February). The following day, April 5, 2012, CNN's Martin Savidge reported that forensic audio expert Tom Owen claimed it was "fucking punks." It is said to be "fucking punks" in the affidavit of probable cause, dated April 11, 2012. Other reviewers of the call have offered alternate interpretations of what was said, some labeling it "unintelligible." According to the Associated Press, the alleged racial slur "fed growing outrage over the police department's initial decision not to arrest Zimmerman."

=== Audio editing by NBC ===
Between March 19 and 27, 2012, the NBC Nightly News, NBC's Today show, and NBC's network-owned Miami affiliate WTVJ ran segments which misleadingly merged parts of Zimmerman's call. On one version of the recording played by NBC, Zimmerman was heard saying, "This guy looks like he's up to no good or he's on drugs or something... He's got his hand in his waistband, and he's a black male." In another, Zimmerman's voice was spliced to say "This guy looks like he's up to no good. He looks black." In the original 9-1-1 recording, Zimmerman said: "This guy looks like he's up to no good. Or he's on drugs or something. It's raining and he's just walking around, looking about." The 9-1-1 operator then asked: "OK, and this guy, is he black, white or Hispanic?", and Zimmerman answered, "He looks black." The phrase, "He's got his hand in his waistband, and he's a black male" came several exchanges after that point in the conversation.

Erik Wemple of The Washington Post wrote that NBC's alterations "would more readily paint Zimmerman as a racial profiler. In reality... Zimmerman simply answered a question... Nothing prejudicial at all in responding to such an inquiry... To portray that exchange in a way that wrongs Zimmerman is high editorial malpractice..."

NBC issued an apology for "an error made in the production process that we deeply regret," but never apologized on the air. The network said that the Today show and Miami edits took place in two separate incidents involving different people. A Miami-based NBC News producer lost her job, WTVJ reporter Jeff Burnside was fired, and two other employees were disciplined. Lilia Luciano, who was the reporter on broadcasts containing both edited versions of the audio, was also fired, and some of her aired reports on the Trayvon Martin story, along with the misleading audio, were removed from the NBC News website.

On December 6, 2012, Zimmerman filed a defamation lawsuit against NBC alleging that they intentionally edited the phone call so that Zimmerman would sound racist. The lawsuit said, "NBC saw the death of Trayvon Martin not as a tragedy but as an opportunity to increase ratings, and so set about to create the myth that George Zimmerman was a racist and predatory villain." An NBC spokeswoman said the network strongly disagreed with the accusations that Zimmerman made in the complaint, stating, "There was no intent to portray Mr. Zimmerman unfairly and we intend to vigorously defend our position in court." In June 2014, a summary judgment was issued in the network's favor which ended the lawsuit filed by Zimmerman. In the ruling, the judge wrote that there was "no clear and convincing evidence that defendants knew that the information published was false at the time it was published, or recklessly disregarded the truth or falsity of those statements".

=== Surveillance video mistake ===
ABC News obtained a surveillance video of Zimmerman walking unassisted into the Sanford police station after the shooting. An officer is seen pausing to look at the back of Zimmerman's head, but ABC originally said that no abrasions or blood can be seen in the video. ABC later reported that it had "re-digitized" the video, and said that this version showed "what appear to be a pair of gashes or welts on George Zimmerman's head," but the story's main focus was on a doctor who claimed it was unlikely that Zimmerman's nose had been broken.

=== Juror B29 controversy ===
In his July 26, 2013, column, Slate journalist William Saletan accused several major news organizations of editing interviews with "Juror B29" to make it appear that she maintained Zimmerman had gotten away with murder when, according to Saletan, she had not actually done so.

== Trial and verdict ==
As news of the case spread, thousands of protesters across the country called for Zimmerman's arrest and a full investigation. On April 11, 2012, amid widespread, intense, and in some cases misleading media coverage, Zimmerman was charged with second-degree murder by a special prosecutor appointed by Governor Rick Scott. Zimmerman's trial began on June 10, 2013, in Sanford. Opening statements took place on June 24, 2013. Jury deliberations began on July 12. On July 13, 2013, the jury found him not guilty.

On February 24, 2015, the United States Department of Justice announced that "there was not enough evidence for a federal hate crime prosecution."

== Aftermath ==
Some legal scholars, including Charles Rose of Stetson University and Jonathan Turley of George Washington University, were not surprised by the verdict and said the prosecution had tactically erred by charging Zimmerman with second-degree murder, which, given Florida's laws on self-defense, made it almost impossible for the prosecution to prove their case beyond a reasonable doubt with the evidence at their disposal. Several attorneys commenting on the case, such as Paul Butler of Georgetown University, said that the prosecution had failed to adequately prepare their witnesses for trial and had been out-maneuvered by the defense attorneys. Harvard Law Professor Alan Dershowitz remained extremely critical of State Attorney Angela Corey's actions in the case, charging that "her conduct bordered on criminal conduct" and "in 50 years of litigating cases ... rarely have I seen [a prosecutor] as bad as this prosecutor".

George Zimmerman remained in hiding after the verdict, although it was reported that on July 17, four days after the verdict, Zimmerman helped rescue several people from an overturned vehicle in Sanford, Florida. The family rescued by Zimmerman had planned a press conference but later dropped the plan because they were worried about adverse public reaction to saying anything positive about Zimmerman. A month later, Zimmerman was seen in Cocoa, Florida, touring a factory of the company that manufactured the gun he had used in the shooting. Zimmerman was said to have asked about the legality of buying a 12-gauge shotgun.

Zimmerman's parents claimed that they too had received a large number of death threats and that they were still afraid to return to their home after the verdict. A Winter Park, Florida, woman, whose phone number was posted online by a website that mistakenly identified the number as George Zimmerman's said she also received death threats. The woman said that when she reported the calls to the Seminole County Sheriff's Department, she was told that the sheriff's office was receiving 400 death threats per minute on social media websites.

The day after the verdict was delivered, the NAACP posted a petition formally requesting the Justice Department to open a civil rights case against George Zimmerman. Within hours, 130,000 people had signed the petition.

During a speech to the NAACP, Attorney General Eric Holder stated that the Department of Justice was continuing to investigate Zimmerman for civil rights violations after the verdict, and also criticized existing "stand-your-ground" laws. Holder's speech was denounced by the National Rifle Association of America (NRA) and Florida Governor Rick Scott.

Although there were scattered incidents of disturbances and vandalism following the not-guilty ruling, fears of widespread civil unrest (as per the Rodney King verdict in 1992) were unrealized. (Note: The day after the verdict, there was unrest in Oakland, California; protesters burned U.S. and California flags, broke windows, started small fires in the streets, and vandalized a police squad car. On July 15, at least 12 people were arrested for disorderly behavior at protests in New York City, and thirteen people were arrested in Los Angeles after multiple incidents of public assaults and vandalism. On July 17, seventeen people were arrested after unruly behavior at protests in Victorville, California, and on July 18, eleven people were arrested in San Bernardino, California, where several bystanders and a police horse were injured after disorderly behavior.) A Hispanic man in Baltimore was reportedly beaten by a group of youths–one of whom armed with a handgun–who allegedly chanted "This is for Trayvon!" A white man in Wauwatosa, Wisconsin, said he was beaten by a group of African-American youth who were yelling "This is for Trayvon Martin!" The man said he was saved from the assailants by a young African-American couple who came to his rescue. In Washington, D.C., an adult white male was kicked by three African-American men, and robbed of his phone and wallet. The man said the three assailants yelled out "This is for Trayvon!" Police investigated the incident as a hate crime. On the night of the trial, a protest in the Crenshaw neighborhood of Los Angeles turned violent as the protesters began attacking bystanders, setting objects ablaze, and began looting and vandalizing stores including a Wal-Mart and the Baldwin Hills Crenshaw Plaza before Los Angeles Police were able disperse the crowd by blocking traffic on Crenshaw Boulevard.

Days after the Zimmerman trial verdict had been announced, several dozen activists known as the Dream Defenders began to camp outside Governor Rick Scott's office in the Capitol, demanding that the governor call the legislature into special session to pass what the activists called The Trayvon Martin Civil Rights Act, which would repeal the Stand Your Ground law, outlaw racial profiling, and discourage the use of zero tolerance policies in schools. As the occupation entered its second week, Governor Scott maintained that he would not order a special session of the legislature.

Democratic leaders in the Florida legislature, Senate Minority Leader Chris Smith and House Minority Leader Perry Thurston also called on the governor to convene a special session of the legislature, in order to overhaul or possibly repeal the Stand Your Ground provisions of Florida's self-defense laws. Senator Smith said that the verdict in the Zimmerman trial showed the adverse effect of the Stand Your Ground law.

On July 19, six days after the verdict, President Barack Obama gave an impromptu 20-minute speech in the White House Press Room, in which he spoke about the trial and about race relations in the United States. Obama said that he identified with Trayvon, that "Trayvon Martin could have been me, 35 years ago." He also said that black men in the United States, including himself, commonly suffered racial profiling.

A week after the verdict, peaceful rallies and vigils were held in more than 100 cities nationwide to protest against racial profiling, demand the repeal of Stand Your Ground laws, and call for a federal trial of Zimmerman for violations of civil rights laws.

A nationwide poll conducted for The Washington Post and ABC News found sharp divisions along racial and political lines over the shooting and over the jury's verdict. Nearly 90% of African Americans called the shooting unjustified, compared to 33% of whites; and some 62% of Democrats disapproved of the verdict, compared to 20% of Republicans. Gallup reported that the reaction was "almost exactly the opposite" of that following the O. J. Simpson murder case, when 89% of African Americans agreed with the jury decision, compared to 36% of whites. A Pew Research Center poll found similar divisions along racial lines in the Zimmerman case. The Pew poll also found large differences in reactions to the trial verdict according to age. The majority of Americans younger than 30 expressed dissatisfaction with the verdict (53% to 29%), while the reaction was reversed for those age 65 and older (50% satisfied versus 33% dissatisfied).

Comparisons were made between the Trayvon Martin case and the O.J. Simpson case, and how race impacted both. During an interview with Piers Morgan, when asked if there was a similarity in the racial aspects of the cases, Ron Goldman’s sister Kim said all of the evidence pointed towards guilt in Simpson’s case, while she believed George Zimmerman’s not guilty verdict was correct because it was a self defense case and that the killing of Trayvon Martin was not racially charged. Fred Goldman also denied racism played a factor in the killing of Trayvon or the outcome of the Simpson trial in an interview.

During and following the trial, Facebook users started posting the phrase "black lives matter," which would inspire the Black Lives Matter movement.

In December 2019, George Zimmerman filed a lawsuit against Trayvon Martin's family, their attorneys, the prosecutors in the trial, Rachel Jeantel, Brittany Diamond Eugene, and others. The suit alleged a civil conspiracy by the Martin family and their lawyers, malicious prosecution by the prosecutors, and defamation by several parties. The suit asked for more than $100 million in damages. The lawsuit was unsuccessful and was dismissed in February 2022.

== See also ==
- List of solved missing person cases (post-2000)
- Killing of Markeis McGlockton
- Killing of Sara-Nicole Morales
