= Natalie Aleta Jackson =

American lawyer and civil right activist

Natalie Jackson
- Born: Natalie Aleta Jackson; Sanford, Florida, U.S.
- Education: Hampton University (BA); University of Florida (JD)
- Occupation: Civil Trial Attorney
- Known for: Attorney for the families of Trayvon Martin and Torey Breedlove
- Website: Official website

Natalie Aleta Jackson is an American trial attorney from Orlando, Florida. She is also known as an author and human rights activist. Her involvement in the Trayvon Martin case and her use of the #TrayvonMartin Twitter hashtag (considered by some a precursor to #BlackLivesMatter) has led to her being connected to the formation of that movement. She is frequently invited to speak on the Black Lives Matter movement. She is best known for her work on the Trayvon Martin case, though she has been mentioned in the media regarding a number of other high-profile cases. Jackson is a frequent commenter on ongoing cases for news publications.

== Early life and education ==
Jackson's father, Captain Nathaniel Jackson, Jr., died in Vietnam when she was two years old. Jackson is a navy veteran who performed a number of roles in the US Navy from 1986 to 1991 and again from 1994 to 1999, including serving on the aircraft carrier USS Theodore Roosevelt (CVN-71) and at the Pentagon as a Naval Intelligence Officer. From 1991 to 1994, she attended Hampton University, graduating in 1994 with a BA in History. Following her exit from Naval Intelligence in 1999, she studied law at the University of Florida, attaining her JD in 2002.

== Legal career ==
After being admitted to the Florida Bar in 2003, Jackson along with her law school classmate, Sadiki Alexander, started a legal group called Jackson & Alexander in Sanford, Florida. Unable to gain traction, they was forced to shutter this business in 2006. Following a large monetary settlement in a 2007 case, Jackson formed the Women's Trial Group, continuing there in the role of founding attorney until 2013. Since 2014, Jackson has operated Natalie Jackson Law in Orlando. Jackson has been involved in a number of high-profile cases in her career, including a case involving NASCAR in 2007 and the Trayvon Martin case in 2012.

== Notable cases ==
=== NASCAR aviation crash ===
In 2008, Jackson represented the Woodard family after an airplane owned by NASCAR crashed into their home killing two family members. The crash also claimed the life of a 4-year-old girl in the house next door and resulted in serious injuries for the other family members. After pre-litigation negotiations, Jackson said, “United States Aviation Underwriters approached the Woodard family”. with the purpose of settling. Jackson settled out of court for an undisclosed amount, concluding two separate claims she filed on behalf of Joe and Jurnee Woodard, the two surviving family members.

=== Torey Breedlove ===
In January 2010, Torey Breedlove, suspected of auto theft, was shot at 137 times by 10 Orange County sheriff deputies as he attempted to leave a parking lot. According to witnesses at the scene, the officers were in plainclothes, their cars were unmarked, and they never identified themselves as police when they approached Breedlove's car with their weapons drawn. Natalie Jackson, on behalf of the Breedlove family, filed a lawsuit against the officers present, alleging excessive use of force. The presiding U.S. District Judge Gregory A. Presnell denied the officers qualified immunity, saying that Breedlove's attempt to flee was reasonable, given the circumstances. He also called the shooting “more akin to an execution than an attempt to arrest an unarmed suspect,” noting that a reasonable jury could conclude the officers used excessive force. Following this judicial order, the two parties settled within three months.

=== James Jones ===
On September 16, 2010, James Jones boarded his daughter's school bus with the intent to talk to some students who his daughter said had been bullying her. In footage from the bus's surveillance camera, Jones can be seen and heard threatening the alleged bullies and the bus driver. Jones was arrested and charged with disorderly conduct and disturbing a school function in Lake Mary, Fla. Ultimately, Jones paid a $3000 fine and did community service.

=== Trayvon Martin ===
On February 26, 2012, Trayvon Martin was shot and killed by George Zimmerman. Zimmerman claimed self-defense; under Florida's “stand your ground” law, police claimed, they needed evidence contradicting Zimmerman's account before they could arrest him. Trayvon Martin's family hired the services of Attorney Ben Crump who, in turn, sought the assistance of Natalie Jackson. Jackson then enlisted the services of her long-time publicist Ryan Julison, whose handling of the case was pivotal in gaining the broad attention the family and legal team had been seeking. The attention of the Black Panthers, Rev. Al Sharpton, and a host of celebrities turned the story into national news. News conferences were held at Jackson's Orlando law office. Zimmerman's trial began on June 10, 2013, in Sanford. On July 13, a jury acquitted Zimmerman of the charges of second degree murder and manslaughter. For three years, the U.S. Department of Justice (DOJ) investigated Zimmerman on civil rights charges. In February 2015, the DOJ concluded there was not sufficient evidence that Zimmerman intentionally violated the civil rights of Martin, saying the Zimmerman case did not meet the "high standard" for a federal hate crime prosecution. Following Zimmerman's acquittal, Jackson expressed regret that the prosecution in the case did not focus more on the racial aspect, saying that the “biggest mistake was to ignore race,” a sentiment echoed by Martin's father Tracy.

=== Noel Carter ===
In 2015, Noel Carter was arrested outside a nightclub in downtown Orlando, Florida. The lawsuit later filed against the police force claimed that he had been “brutally and viciously” beaten by two officers. Despite video evidence from multiple witnesses at the scene, the chief of police declined to take any form of action against the officers involved, a decision criticized by Natalie Jackson, who was acting as Carter's attorney in defense of the charges relating to his arrest. Jackson filed a civil rights suit in 2019, and the case was settled in 2020.

=== Terre Johnson ===
Terre Johnson is a homeless man who was beaten and arrested in 2015 by an Orlando police officer. Jackson, Johnson's attorney, filed a lawsuit against the city of Orlando and the officer in 2018. In 2020, after District Judge Roy B. Dalton Jr. denied the officer's qualified immunity claim, allowing the case to proceed trial, attorney Ben Crump, who frequently co-counsels with Natalie Jackson, joined the case. The case was set to begin on July 6, 2020.

== In the media ==
Jackson has frequently appeared on television and in other media for reasons related to the high-profile cases she has worked. In connection with the James Jones case, she appeared on ABC's Good Morning America with James and his wife Deborah. In April 2012, Jackson was interviewed by CNN concerning the charges against George Zimmerman in the Trayvon Martin case, saying that the charges showed “Trayvon mattered.” Jackson also appears in the 2018 docuseries Rest in Power: The Trayvon Martin Story
