= Mark O'Mara =

American criminal defense lawyer (born 1956)

- Born: February 8, 1956 (age 70); Queens, New York, U.S.
- Education: University of Central Florida (B.A., 1979); Florida State University College of Law (J.D., 1982)
- Occupations: Lawyer, O'Mara Law Group; Legal analyst, CNN
- Website: Official website

Mark Matthew O'Mara (born February 8, 1956) is an American criminal defense lawyer in Orlando, Florida, known for being the attorney for George Zimmerman. He is a former prosecutor.

O'Mara is a legal analyst for CNN.

== Early life and education ==
Mark O'Mara is one of five siblings in a Roman Catholic family of Irish descent. He was raised in Rosedale, Queens, New York City. His father, John Joseph O'Mara, was a World War II veteran, shot down over Germany and spent the better part of a year in a POW camp, until liberated by the Soviets. His father came back to Brooklyn and married his fiancée, Anna "Nancy" McAteer. John Joseph O'Mara joined the New York Fire Department, where he rose to Battalion Chief. He was also President of the Fire Officers Union before he retired and moved to Orlando, Florida, bringing his wife and youngest son Mark, with him.

O'Mara is a 1979 graduate of the University of Central Florida, where he was involved in the Sigma Alpha Epsilon fraternity, and the Student Government. He was elected as student body president, and graduated and received his J.D. degree from the Florida State University College of Law in 1982. In 2026 Mark married Nicolette Corso Vilmos, a business litigation attorney with Berger Singerman https://www.bergersingerman.com/team/nicolette-corso-vilmos.

== Career ==
O'Mara was an Assistant State Attorney with the Seminole County State Attorney Office from 1982 to 1984. Mark M. O'Mara started his career as a prosecutor for the State Attorney's office in Seminole County [5], then began his private practice, joining forces with other local attorneys before beginning his own firm... Mark is one of only a few lawyers in Florida who are Board Certified in both Criminal Trial Law and Marital and Family Law; he is also certified in Collaborative Law and is a Supreme Court Certified Family Mediator and Circuit Civil Mediator. He has practiced in both state and federal courts throughout the nation, often co-counseling for complex trials and civil rights matters.

He has recently expanded his practice to include representing clients aggrieved by large corporations, from drug and medical device manufacturers to automobile companies in an area of law known as Mass Torts. He and his team utilize the research and trial presentation skills honed over thirty-six years to hold these companies responsible for their wrongs, and to make them more responsible in their future behavior.

O'Mara was a legal analyst for WKMG Channel 6, an Orlando, Florida television station. After the Zimmerman case was over, he was hired as a legal analyst by CNN, a position he has held for over two years.

=== George Zimmerman trial ===
O'Mara gained national attention while serving as the defense attorney for George Zimmerman, who was found not guilty of second-degree murder in the shooting death of Trayvon Martin.

In September 2013, after a domestic altercation between George and Shellie Zimmerman, O'Mara said he was continuing to represent George Zimmerman in a defamation lawsuit against NBCUniversal but was not representing him in the "domestic altercation case or his impending divorce case".
