= Lilia Luciano =

Puerto Rican journalist (born 1984)

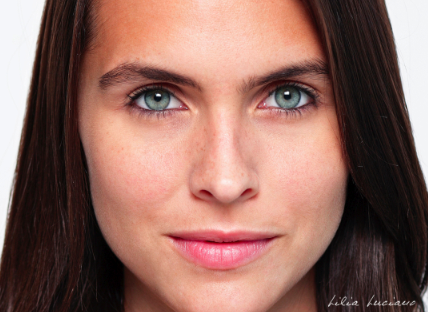
- Born: October 12, 1984 (age 42); San Juan, Puerto Rico
- Citizenship: United States; Puerto Rico
- Education: Tufts University; University of Miami
- Occupations: Journalist, columnist, film producer
- Years active: 2004–present
- Employer: CBS News
- Notable work: CBS News 24/7 (the network's streaming news service), where she serves as an anchor.; CBS Mornings; CBS Evening News; CBS News Sunday Morning; CBS News Radio
- Spouse: Luis Alayo (m. 2007–2009)
- Website: lilialuciano.com

Lilia Luciano (born 12 October 1984) is a journalist, filmmaker, podcaster and public speaker born and raised in Puerto Rico. She is currently a national correspondent and anchor at CBS News based in New York and host of the iHeart Radio podcast, El Flow. Before CBS News she worked as the investigative reporter at ABC 10 in Sacramento and was the chief investigative correspondent on Discovery Channel's Border Live. Her coverage of the mass shooting in Uvalde, Texas earned her and her CBS News team an Emmy Nomination for Outstanding Breaking News Coverage in 2023.

In 2019, she was awarded a Walter Cronkite Award for Excellence in Journalism as a special commendation for enterprise for her four-part documentary series, Puerto Rico Rises, which she directed and produced for ABC Sacramento, a TEGNA station. She has also won five Regional Emmy Awards. In 2018, her coverage of the Northern California Wildfires of 2018 received a regional Edward R. Murrow Award for Continuous Coverage. Luciano has won four Regional Emmy Awards. In 2019, she won the Emmy for her special TEGNA series "Crisis at the Border," and for her team's coverage of the Northern California Wildfires. In 2018, she won for California Wildfires coverage and for her documentary Puerto Rico Rises. In 2013, Luciano was also awarded GLAAD's Outstanding Digital Journalism Article media award for her coverage of homophobia in U.S. Hispanic media.

Before CBS News Luciano worked as investigative reporter at ABC 10 in Sacramento, California. She is the director and producer of Wars of Others, an HBO Latino documentary film about the consequences of the U.S. War on Drugs on Colombian farmers and the founder of CoInspire, an interview series about entrepreneurship in partnership with Rokk3r Labs. She has worked as a host and contributor at various Vice platforms in English and Spanish. Previously, she worked as a national news correspondent for NBC News's The Today Show, Nightly News with Brian Williams and MSNBC. She is a TEDx speaker and contributing columnist for HuffPost writing both in English and Spanish about issues concerning the Hispanic community, the War on Drugs and Human Rights. She servers the advisory council of United Nations Foundation's Girl Up initiative. She has served as a moderator at the Oslo Freedom Forum Human Rights conferences since 2016.

== Journalism ==
As a Los Angeles based correspondent at CBS News, Luciano has led the network's coverage of California and Oregon wildfires, BLM protests in Portland, immigration at the U.S.-Mexico border, the deadly crowd surge at Travis Scott's Astroworld festival, she covered the historic 2021 tornadoes in Kentucky, the oil spill in Southern California, among other national breaking news stories. Some of her feature stories include interviews with EGOT winner Rita Moreno, basketball legend Magic Johnson, and Oscar-winning director Jimmy Chin for CBS Mornings and CBS Sunday Morning.

Luciano also produced and hosted Fighting for Paradise: The Future of Puerto Rico, a CBS News documentary streaming on Paramount Plus and CBSN.

As an investigative reporter at ABC 10, Luciano has uncovered patterns of corruption in family court through an ongoing multipart series. She has run investigations on sex trafficking, low teacher diversity, campaign financing, police shootings, including daily coverage of the shooting of Stephon Clark in 2018. Her HBO documentary film, released in 2016 uncovers the social, environmental and health impacts of aerial spraying in Colombia.

As a VICE News host, she investigated the oil and gas industry's impact on Louisiana's loss of coastal land. At VICELAND's Black Market Dispatches, Luciano embedded with a caravan of gasoline smugglers, hiding in a racing car filled with 400 gallons of contraband gasoline.

== Recognition ==
In 2018, Luciano was awarded a National Walter Cronkite Award for Excellence in Journalism for her Documentary Puerto Rico Rises., as well as a Regional Edward R Murrow Award for Continuous Coverage of the Northern California Wildfires. Luciano has earned 5 Northern California Emmys. The stories nominated include coverage of immigration, asylum seekers, the California homeless crisis, California Wildfires and her documentary about colonialism and Hurricane Maria in Puerto Rico.

== Education ==
Born in San Juan, Puerto Rico, Luciano attended Tufts University in Massachusetts to study pre-medicine. In 2003, she transferred to the University of Miami; she graduated in 2007 with a bachelor's degree in economics and broadcast journalism.

== Early years ==
While at the University of Miami, Luciano interned with Telemundo, where she produced and anchored a finance and economics segment for Telemundo Internacional. After graduating from The University of Miami, Luciano was hired by Univision Networks as correspondent and co-anchor for evening newscast En Vivo y Directo.

== Television ==
She was a chief investigative correspondent for Discovery Channel's Border Live show, embedding in communities, and with border enforcement agencies along the U.S.-Mexico border. She was also TEGNA-owned ABC 10's investigative reporter, a position that earned her regional and national awards in journalism. She investigated politics, crime, family court, immigration, housing, education, homelessness, police shootings, drug policy, wildfires, and other climate disasters, including an award-winning documentary about Hurricane Maria in Puerto Rico.

Luciano directed Guerras Ajenas, an HBO Latin America Documentary about the consequences of U.S. drug policy in Colombia. She also worked as a host for multiple Vice platforms, including Viceland's World of Sports, Black Market Dispatches and Vice News.

Luciano joined NBC News in December 2010 from Univision network where she served as co-host of a live daily program and as a correspondent for the top-rated show Aquí y Ahora. Previously, she was a co-host from 2006 to 2010 at Escandalo TV (Scandal TV), a spicy Spanish gossip show at TeleFutura Network.

In August 2011, Lilia Luciano covered Hurricane Irene from Nassau, Bahamas for NBC's Nightly News with Brian Williams, Today Show, MSNBC, The Weather Channel, CNBC and Telemundo. She went on to cover the storm's trail of devastation in North Carolina.

During the summer of 2011 Luciano covered the Casey Anthony first degree murder trial in Orlando, Florida for MSNBC and the Today Show. Luciano reported live from the Orange County courthouse throughout the six-week trial. At midnight on July 17, she gave a special breaking news report on MSNBC to announce Anthony's release from prison.

In January 2012, Luciano was the only national correspondent from the major networks covering the murder trial of Joran Van der Sloot in Lima, Peru for both Today Show, and Telemundo, obtaining exclusive interviews with the victim's family and government authorities in Lima.

On February 22, 2012, Luciano reported for Today, MSNBC and Comcast Sports on the first degree murder trial of University of Virginia Lacrosse captain George Huguely, convicted in the death of his girlfriend Yeardly Love.

Luciano was one of the national television reporters on the scene in Sanford, Florida covering the Trayvon Martin story.

On May 2, 2012, it was announced that Luciano was no longer at NBC News, after it was found that the audio portion of George Zimmerman's 9-1-1 call, reporting a potential burglary, was edited in a manner that made Zimmerman sound racist by making an unprompted statement that Martin was black instead of answering the 911 dispatcher's questions. NBC dismissed the producer responsible for editing the piece and also dismissed Luciano for the oversight. All of Luciano's reports on the Trayvon Martin story which contained the misleading edit were removed from the Today website.

NBC News president Steve Capus told Reuters that the edit, made by a Miami-based producer, was "a mistake and not a deliberate act to misrepresent the phone call." The network claimed that it was done in order to meet a maximum time requirement for the piece, a common pressure in morning television. The producer was subsequently fired and NBC News apologized for the error, though not on the air, stating it was an "editing error in the production process."

On December 6, 2012, Luciano was named as a defendant in a defamation lawsuit filed against NBC by George Zimmerman regarding their erroneous edit and airing of his 911 call to advance a false narrative. Zimmerman's criminal trial concluded with a "not guilty" jury verdict and acquittal on July 13, 2013, allowing his lawsuit to proceed. Zimmerman's lawsuit against NBC and his subsequent appeal were both dismissed in Florida courts.

== Non-profit work ==
Since 2013, Luciano has served on the Advisory Board of the United Nations Foundation Girl Up Campaign. She is a Today I am Brave Speaker series.

In 2010, she served as spokesperson to the Univision and Bill Gates Foundation's Education Campaign, "Es El Momento", as well as a supporter and collaborator with St. Jude Children's Research Hospital, and Walk Now for Autism.

== Feature Documentaries ==
Luciano is the director and producer of Guerras Ajenas, the first documentary film by HBO Latinoamérica.

== Other facts ==
In 2009, People en Español selected Luciano in their 50 Most Beautiful people issue. In 2010, Cosmopolitan Magazine featured Luciano on their November 2010 cover.
