= Trayvon Martin =

American teenager killed in a shooting (1995–2012)

- Martin at the Experience Aviation camp in 2009
- Born: Trayvon Benjamin Martin; February 5, 1995; Miami, Florida, US
- Died: February 26, 2012 (aged 17); Sanford, Florida, US
- Cause of death: Homicide (gunshot wound)
- Resting place: Dade Memorial Park
- Education: Miami Carol City Senior High School; Dr. Michael M. Krop Senior High School

Trayvon Benjamin Martin (February 5, 1995 – February 26, 2012) was an African American from Miami Gardens, Florida, who was fatally shot in Sanford, Florida, by George Zimmerman, a 28-year-old Hispanic-American. Martin had accompanied his father to visit his father's fiancée at her townhouse at The Retreat at Twin Lakes in Sanford. On the evening of February 26, 2012, Martin was walking back to the fiancée's house from a nearby convenience store. Zimmerman, a member of the community watch, saw Martin and reported him to the Sanford Police as suspicious. Several minutes later, an altercation occurred and Zimmerman fatally shot Martin in the chest.

Zimmerman was injured during the altercation with Martin. He said he shot Martin in self-defense, and was not charged at the time. The police said there was no evidence to refute his claim of self-defense, and Florida's stand-your-ground law prohibited them from arresting or charging him. After national media focused on the incident, Zimmerman was eventually charged and tried, but a jury acquitted him of second-degree murder and manslaughter in July 2013.

Following Martin's death, rallies, marches, and protests were held across the United States. In March 2012, hundreds of students at his high school held a walkout in support of him. An online petition calling for a full investigation and prosecution of Zimmerman garnered 2.2 million signatures. Also in March, the media coverage surrounding Martin's death became the first story of 2012 to be featured more than the presidential race, which was underway at the time. A national debate about racial profiling and stand-your-ground laws ensued. Rick Scott, the then governor of Florida, appointed a task force to examine the state's self-defense laws. Martin's life was scrutinized by the media and bloggers. The name Trayvon was tweeted more than two million times in the 30 days following the shooting. More than 1,000 people attended the viewing of his remains the day before his funeral, which was held on March 3 in Miami. He was buried in Dade-Memorial Park (North), in Miami. A memorial was dedicated to Martin at the Goldsboro Westside Historical Museum, a Black history museum in Sanford, in July 2013.

== Biography ==
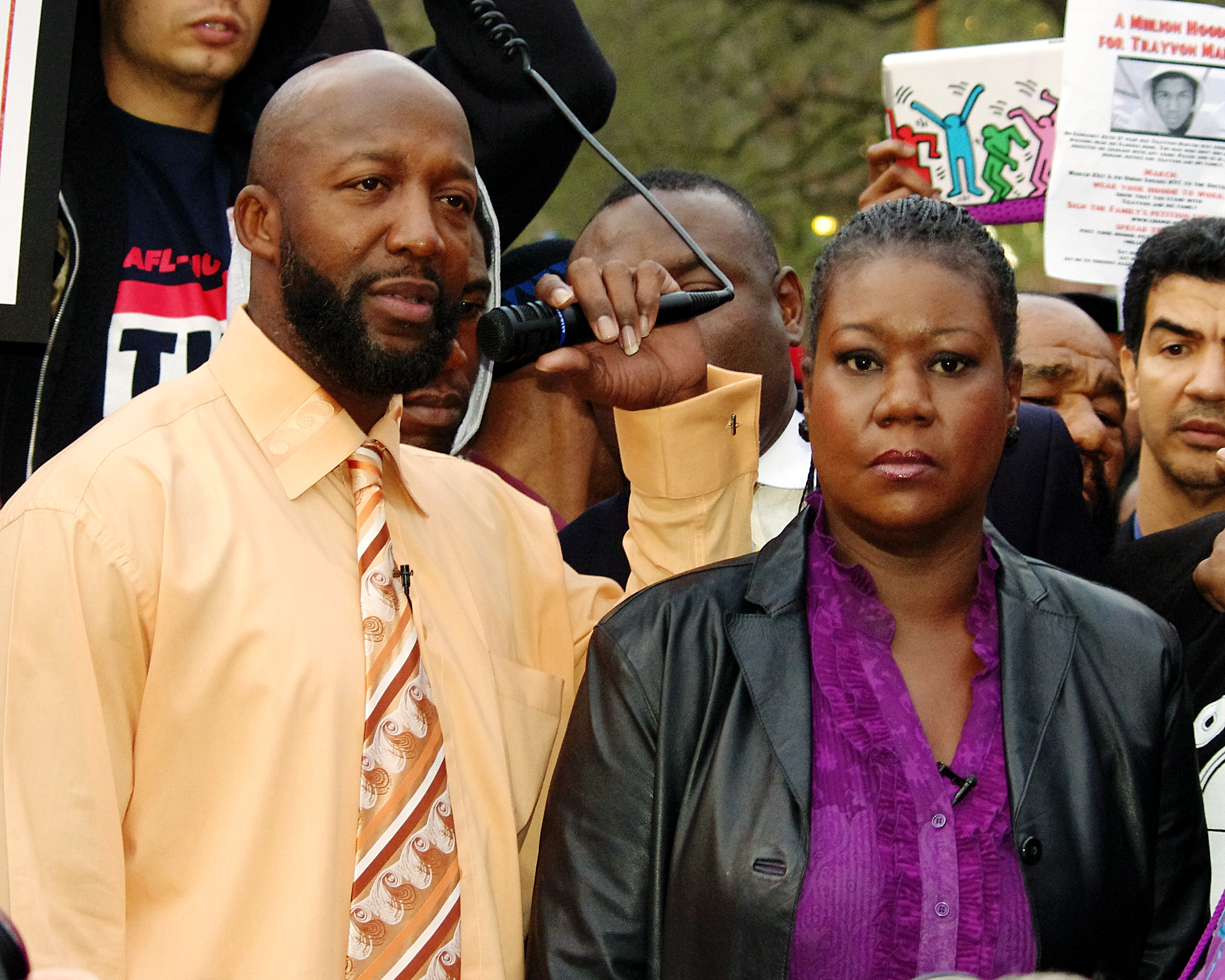
Tracy Martin and Sybrina Fulton at an event in 2012

Martin was born in 1995 in Miami, Florida, to Tracy Martin and Sybrina Fulton, who divorced in 1999. At the time of the shooting, Fulton was a program coordinator for the Miami Dade Housing Authority, and Tracy Martin was a truck driver; they lived near each other in Miami Gardens. Martin's older maternal half-brother, Jahvaris Fulton, was a college student at the time (who would later testify in the Zimmerman trial).

After being divorced, Martin's father married Alicia Stanley, who had two daughters from a previous marriage. They met when Martin was about three years old and were together for about 14 years. Stanley told CNN's Anderson Cooper that before she and Tracy Martin separated, Trayvon was with her 90% of the time, and that she went to all his football games and took care of him when he was sick. She said that Trayvon was a kind and loving person, not a "thug" as the media portrayed him. (Note: Alicia Stanley's interview aired on June 28, 2012 * Video of Stanley's interview on AC360° * Transcript of Stanley's interview on AC360°)

When Martin was nine years old, he pulled his father, who had been immobilized by burns to the legs, out of a fire in their apartment, saving his life. Martin enjoyed sports video games. He washed cars, babysat, and cut grass to earn his own money. Martin had played football at the park since he was five years old and his team was coached in part by his father. Another of Martin's former football coaches said Martin had been one of the best players on their football team (The Wolverines) that played at Forzano Park in Miramar, Florida. Martin played for the Wolverines from ages 8 to 13. He sometimes sat out when his father benched him "because he messed up in school". While in high school, Martin volunteered at Forzano Park, working in the concession stand and sometimes staying until 8:00 or 9:00 PM before going home. Martin's former football coach said he was a shy child and always walked with his hoodie and headphones on listening to music.

Martin attended both Norland Middle School and Highland Oaks Middle School in north Miami-Dade County, Florida. He attended Miami Carol City High School in Miami Gardens for his freshman and sophomore years before he transferred to Dr. Michael M. Krop Senior High School in north Miami-Dade in 2011. At the time of the shooting, Martin was a junior at Krop High School. Martin's cousin Stephen Martin, who had been in a park telling jokes with Trayvon the night before his death, said that he and Trayvon had been like brothers growing up. He recalled that Trayvon had been very skilled at assembling, repairing, and riding pocket bikes and dirt bikes. Miriam Martin, Trayvon's aunt and Stephen's mother, said her nephew had often stayed over to visit her family. She also said that Trayvon was fond of wearing a hoodie: "it could be 100 degrees outside and he always had his hoodie on."

Martin had wanted to fly or repair airplanes, and in mid-2009 enrolled in "Experience Aviation", a seven-week program in Opa-locka, Florida, run by award-winning aviator Barrington Irving. According to Irving, Martin was a polite youth "[who] reminded me of myself because I had a strong interest in football until I fell in love with aviation". After Martin graduated from the program, he spent the next summer as a volunteer, helping out new students in the aviation program. According to his parents, Martin had hoped to attend the University of Miami or Florida A&M University.

=== Later teenage years ===
Undated personal photo of Trayvon Martin wearing a hoodie as a teenager. This image was displayed by protesters and sold by merchants on hoodies, T-shirts, and keychains, prompting the family to trademark slogans using his name.

When Martin started high school, his goal of playing professional football was put aside in favor of a career working with airplanes. While in his freshman year at Carol City, Martin attended classes in the mornings at the high school and then went to George T. Baker Aviation School for the rest of his school day. Martin's ninth-grade teacher, who taught him three classes of Aerospace Technology at Baker Aviation School, said he was a normal student, well-behaved, who passed all his classes. According to another teacher at Carol City, math was his favorite subject, and she said she never saw Martin show disrespect. Some students at Carol City compared Martin's death to that of Emmett Till, one of the nation's most infamous civil rights cases.

Martin's mother had him transferred to Dr. Michael M. Krop High School, which has approximately 2,700 students, for his junior year. Fulton said that her son had an average performance in school, and she transferred him because she thought Krop High School was better and she wanted a different environment for him. While a student at Krop High School, Martin had behavioral issues. At the time of the shooting, he was serving a ten-day suspension for having a marijuana pipe and an empty bag containing marijuana residue. He had been suspended twice before, for tardiness and truancy and marking up a door with graffiti. The suspension for graffiti was in October 2011, when Martin was observed by a school police officer on a security camera "hiding and being suspicious" in a restricted area of the school. According to the officer, he later observed Martin marking up a door with "W.T.F." ("what the fuck?"). When his backpack was searched the next day by a Miami-Dade School Police officer, looking for the graffiti marker, the officer found a dozen pieces of women's jewelry, a watch, and a screwdriver that was described by the school police officer as a burglary tool. The jewelry found in his backpack included silver wedding bands and earrings with diamonds. When Martin was asked by the officer if the jewelry belonged to his family or a girlfriend, he said a friend had given it to him. When asked for the name of the friend, Martin declined to provide it. The school police impounded the jewelry and sent photographs of it to detectives at Miami-Dade to investigate it further. No evidence surfaced at that time that the jewelry was stolen. An attorney for Martin's family said the parents did not know about the jewelry or screwdriver. Martin was not charged with any crime related to these suspensions and did not have a juvenile record.

=== Digital footprint ===
Martin posted on Twitter under the username "Slimm", according to the Miami Herald. Martin tweeted his last message two days before he was killed. After his death, Martin's digital footprint was subject to media analysis, with The Herald noting, "But in the racially divisive media hype that has followed the teenager's controversial killing, pages of nonsensical Twitter updates written back when Trayvon’s biggest concerns were getting a call back from a girl are now being examined and scrutinized by bloggers around the nation." Martin frequently posted about food, girls, school, and sex, and quoted rap lyrics and made crude jokes. His email and Facebook accounts were hacked by a white supremacist, and selected tweets from his Twitter account were published on the conservative website The Daily Caller. Supporters of Zimmerman had pointed to Martin's tattoos, social media posts, and texts from his cell phone as evidence of Martin's violent nature and that there was an effort to keep this information from the public. A picture of Martin making an obscene gesture from his account was widely circulated, while pictures from his account of Martin with a birthday cake, fishing with his father, and dressed in a prom suit were not. The website Gawker obtained a screenshot of Martin's email account inbox before it was deleted, showing emails referring to SAT exams and scholarship opportunities.

During Zimmerman's trial, the judge granted defense lawyers access to Martin's cell phone, social media posts, and Facebook and Twitter accounts, saying that the defense team needed to be able to review the evidence for any indications of violent tendencies. Cell phone texts the defense wanted to use showed Martin had discussed about his fights, marijuana use, and guns, and that he had described himself as "gangsta". Benjamin Crump, the Martins' family attorney, said whether Martin had worn gold teeth or used an obscene gesture had nothing to do with his death. (Note: Transcript of Martin's cell phone texts from November, 2011 to February, 2012. at the Wayback Machine (archived June 10, 2015)) The judge eventually ruled that Martin's social media posts would not be mentioned during the trial, although his marijuana use could be. The defense did not present any of this information to the jury, and it was not entered into evidence.

Friends of Martin, who had known him from Highland Oaks Middle School and Carol City High School and corresponded with him over Twitter, said Martin was not prone to violence. One friend said he was the "walk away" type of guy: "he'd rather walk away than fight." Another friend from Twitter who had known him since middle school said he was funny and liked to joke around and make people laugh. At a banquet for Associated Press Broadcasters in Florida, Benjamin Crump, and Mark O'Mara, Zimmerman's defense attorney, both said the role that social media played immediately following Martin's death set a precedent. Crump said that social media had given people who normally would not have a voice in matters like this a chance to engage in the case. O'Mara said the misinformation that was tweeted following Martin's death "caused a firestorm that wasn't a full picture".

== Shooting ==
CCTV footage of Trayvon Martin, minutes before the shooting, purchasing a bag of Skittles and an Arizona Watermelon can.

Tracy Martin said he took his son to Sanford "to disconnect and get his priorities straight". Martin had been to Twin Lakes several times before with his father and sometimes played football with the kids in the neighborhood. On the night of the shooting, Tracy was out to dinner with his fiancée, Brandy Green, while Tracy's and Green's sons stayed at home, watching TV and playing video games. Trayvon went out, walking to a local 7-Eleven store where he bought Skittles candy and an Arizona watermelon drink.

As Martin was returning from the store to the Twin Lakes neighborhood, George Zimmerman, a volunteer Neighborhood Watch person, spotted Martin, who was 5 ft 11 in (1.80 m) tall and weighed 158 pounds (72 kg) at the time of his death. Zimmerman called Sanford police to report Martin, who he said appeared "suspicious". There was an altercation between the two individuals in which Zimmerman shot Martin, killing him. Zimmerman claimed self-defense and was eventually charged in Martin's death. On June 10, 2013, Zimmerman's trial began in Sanford, and on July 13, a jury acquitted him of second-degree murder and of manslaughter charges.

== Aftermath and media discourse ==
=== 2012 ===
Martin's parents, upset that an arrest had not been made in their son's death, contacted Martin's sister-in-law, an attorney who put them in touch with Benjamin Crump, a civil rights attorney from Tallahassee, Florida. Crump took their case pro bono and retained Natalie Jackson, an attorney familiar with Sanford and Seminole County who specialized in women's and children's cases, to help with the Martin case. On March 5, Jackson asked Ryan Julison to help as well. A publicist, Julison initially approached several national media contacts about covering the shooting. Over the next few days and weeks, the national media started reporting on the shooting, including: Reuters, CBS This Morning, ABC World News, and CNN. The Miami Herald reported that in the 30 days following the shooting, the name Trayvon was tweeted more than two million times.

On March 8, Kevin Cunningham, a social media coordinator who had read about Martin's death, created a petition on Change.org, which became the largest in the website's history a few weeks later with 2.2 million signatures. Cunningham said he started the online petition demanding that authorities prosecute Zimmerman, and when the number of signatures reached 10,000, he transferred the petition to Martin's parents after Change.org contacted him. Cunningham was the media coordinator for KinderUSA and said he fell in love with social media during the 2011 Egyptian revolution and was inspired by the killing of Khaled Mohamed Saeed. He thought Martin's death could be a similar situation where the death of one person could trigger a reevaluation of society and revolutionize the justice system and the culture.

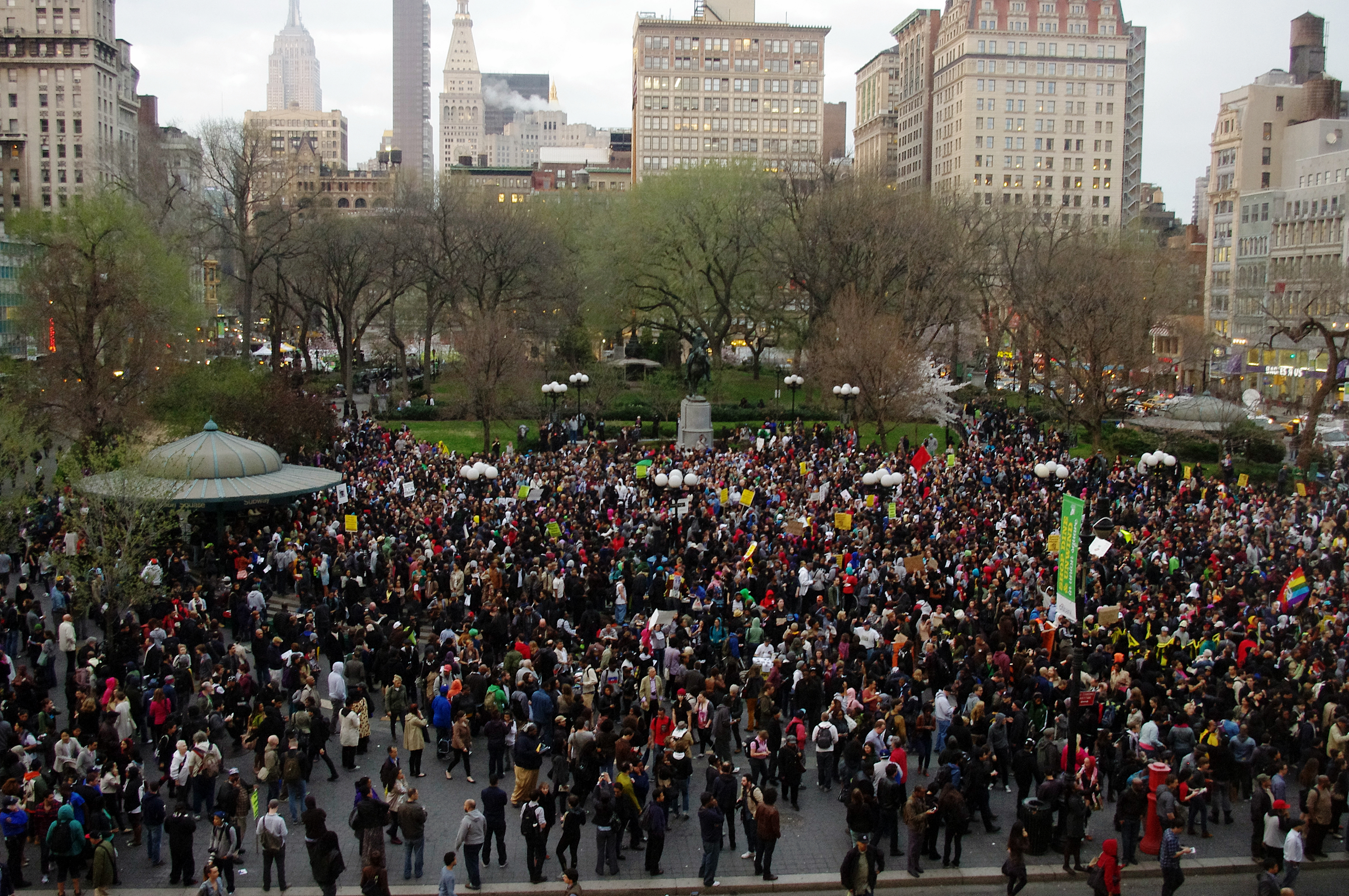
Photo from the "Million Hoodie March" in Union Square

After the death of Martin, the media focus on the case was instrumental in developing a national debate about racial profiling and self-defense laws, with marches and rallies held across the United States. One of the larger rallies, the "Million Hoodie March", was held in Manhattan's Union Square in New York City on March 21. People wore hoodies to symbolize their support for Martin and against profiling used against non-white youths in hoodies. According to Salon, close to five thousand people attended the March, while other media outlets estimated the supporters to be in the hundreds. Martin's parents spoke at the event, and many of the participants at the event were Occupiers who had been evicted the night before from Union Square and returned for the March.

At a White House press conference in March, President Obama was asked about the Martin shooting and said, "If I had a son he would look like Trayvon and I think they [his parents] are right to expect that all of us as Americans are going to take this with the seriousness it deserves." Mitt Romney, the Republican presidential candidate at the time, said that a full inquiry was needed so that "justice could be carried out with impartiality and integrity". The Project for Excellence in Journalism reported in March that media coverage of the Martin case had become the first news story in 2012 to be reported on more than the presidential race.

In June, Martin's parents and members of the Second Chance on Shoot First campaign delivered a petition with 340,000 signatures to the Citizen Safety and Protection task force asking for changes to the stand-your-ground law in Florida. Governor Rick Scott had established the task force after Martin's death to review and make recommendations about the law. Florida was the first state to pass a law that allowed an individual who felt threatened to stand their ground. Joëlle Anne Moreno, a former federal prosecutor, who was part of the task force said it was "clear that there was lots of confusion around the statute". Marion Hammer, a National Rifle Association of America (NRA) lobbyist and former NRA president who had helped write Florida's law, said the law was not about one incident and there was nothing wrong with the law. The task force eventually recommended against repealing the statute, saying Florida residents had a right to defend themselves with deadly force without a duty to retreat if they feel threatened. (Note: Second Chance on Shoot First is a coalition that includes New York City Mayor Michael Bloomberg, the NAACP and the National Urban League. * Final report and other documents from the Task Force on Citizens Safety and Protection) Stand-your-ground laws were not used as a legal defense in the trial of George Zimmerman and had no legal role in his eventual acquittal. In March 2012, Martin's parents created the Trayvon Martin Foundation, which is dedicated to helping families that have lost children to gun violence.

=== 2013 ===
Martin's parents and their legal team enlisted the public relations services of The TASC Group to manage media attention around Martin's death and Zimmerman's subsequent trial. In an interview with New York Times columnist Charles Blow in June, Martin's mother was asked about the texts recovered from her son's cell phone, which "appeared to show a boy who used marijuana, was involved in fights and had a handgun". She said that she was skeptical about the truthfulness of those claims and did not know if they were real or not. She wanted the world to remember him "as just an average teenager, somebody that was struggling through life, but nevertheless had a life".

Politicians, celebrities, musicians, civil rights leaders, and citizens all expressed their opinions on every form of media following the acquittal of Zimmerman. Four days after the acquittal, a group calling themselves the Dream Defenders began a sit-in at the Florida State Capitol to force a special legislative session on Florida's stand-your-ground law. After 31 days, their occupation of the Capitol ended without a special session being called. A group of Martin supporters walked from Jacksonville, Florida, to Sanford to highlight what they believed were injustices concerning Florida's stand-your-ground law. The six-day walk was called the "Walk for Dignity" and ended with a community forum being held and a dedication of the Trayvon Martin memorial at the Goldsboro Westside Historical Museum in Sanford. In Los Angeles, California, an area of a garden at Crenshaw High School was dedicated to Martin in celebration of the 50th anniversary of Martin Luther King Jr.'s "I Have a Dream" speech. A march was also held at the dedication to teach students how to express their First Amendment rights while standing their ground for youth Civil Rights, according to the school.

President Obama speaking in July 2013 about Trayvon Martin (Note: Transcript of President Obama's Remarks * Remarks by the President on Trayvon Martin Video of President Obama's Remarks * President Obama Speaks on Trayvon Martin)

In July, President Obama made comments about the death of Martin after the acquittal of Zimmerman. He said, "I think it would be useful for us to examine some state and local laws to see ... if they are designed in such a way that they may encourage the kinds of altercations and confrontations and tragedies that we saw in the Florida case, rather than defuse potential altercations." He stated that "The African-American community is also knowledgeable that there is a history of racial disparities in the application of our criminal laws, everything from the death penalty to enforcement of our drug laws". It was during these remarks when President Obama said, "Trayvon Martin could have been me 35 years ago."

=== 2014 and later ===
On July 19, 2014, Crenshaw High School in Los Angeles was scheduled to hold a "peace walk and peace talk" hosted by Martin's parents, Sybrina Fulton and Tracy Martin. On May 13, 2017, Martin posthumously received a bachelor's degree in aeronautical science from Florida Memorial University "in honor of the steps he took during his young life toward becoming a pilot". Martin's parents accepted the award for their son.

Frank Ocean's 2016 album, Blonde, gave homage to Martin among others in the album's lead single, "Nikes". In January 2017, Martin's parents (under Penguin Random House) published a book about Martin's life and death entitled Rest in Power: The Enduring Life of Trayvon Martin. In October 2020, a street in front of the Dr. Michael M. Krop High School in Miami that Martin attended was named "Trayvon Martin Avenue".

== See also ==
- Mothers of the Movement
