= The Retreat at Twin Lakes =

Gated community in Sanford, Florida, US

Coordinates: 28°47′33″N 81°19′50.5″W

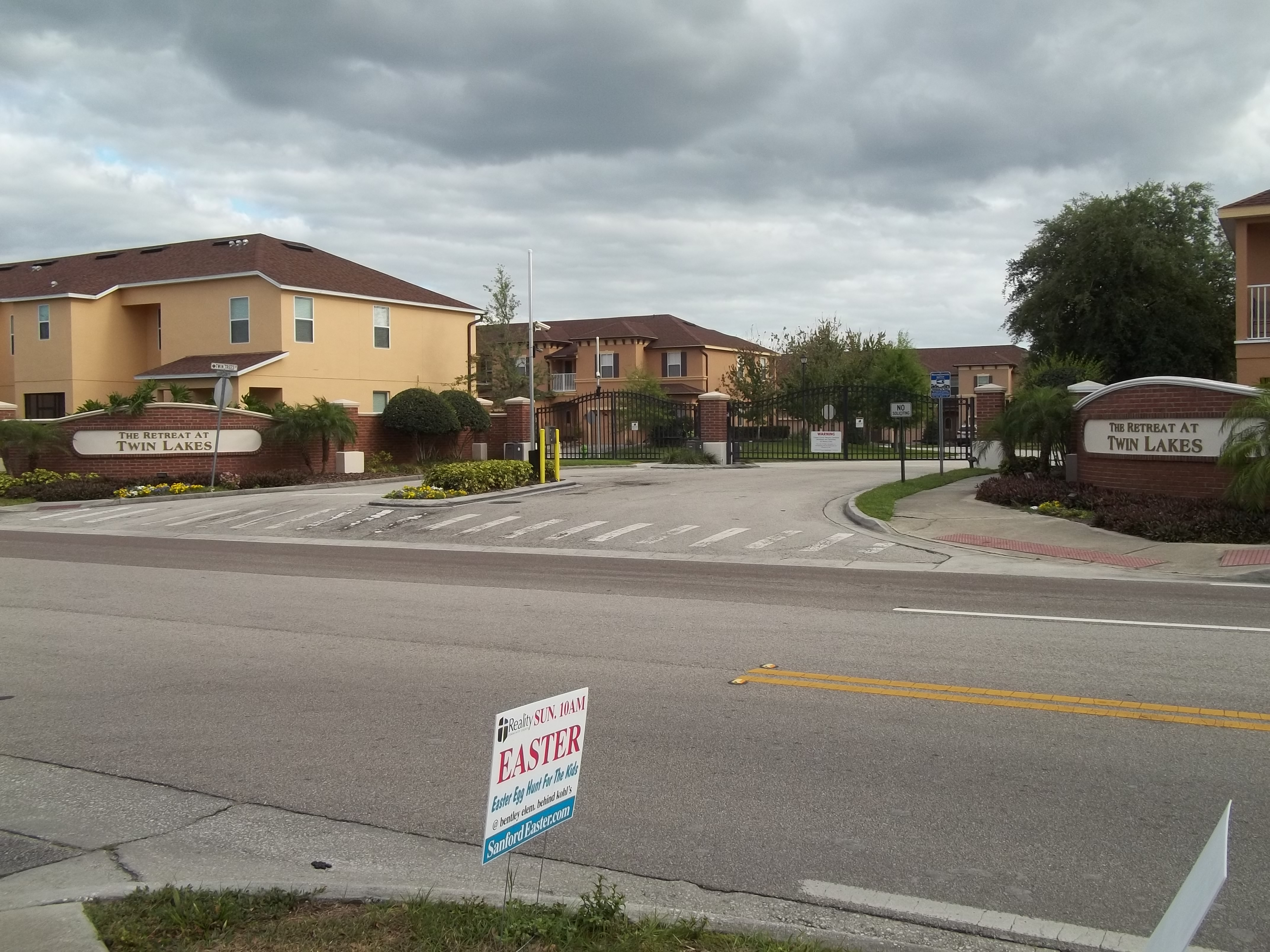
The Retreat at Twin Lakes, north entrance

The Retreat at Twin Lakes is a gated community in the US city of Sanford, Florida. The community initially consisted of 1,400-square-foot (130 m^{2}) townhouses which sold on average for $250,000, but had values below $100,000 by February 2012 due in large part to the 2008 financial crisis. Twin Lakes received national attention as the site of the killing of Trayvon Martin by George Zimmerman.

== History ==
In 2004, Engle Homes began construction on the 263 two-story townhouse development which is located 18 miles (30 km) northeast of downtown Orlando. The community, near Interstate 4 in a suburban section of Sanford, was marketed as "an oasis where nobody could park a car on the street or paint the house an odd color." The remaining lots were acquired by Lennar following the 2008 bankruptcy filing of Engle, and the neighborhood was finally built out in 2011.

George Zimmerman moved to the community in 2009. At that time, the Great Recession caused a "demographic transformation" of the gated community, where 1,400-square-foot (130 m^{2}) townhouses had once sold on average for $250,000. However, by February 2012, that value "...had fallen below $100,000." With the change came a "spate of burglaries" which were largely due to the "...large-scale foreclosures in the wake of the housing crash led investors to rent, rather than sell, the spaces, which brought a new, transient type of resident." These events were the background which led to the fatal shooting and the controversy of the stand-your-ground laws which were in effect in the entire state of Florida. After the shootings, the community was in the "national spotlight."

== Demographics ==
According to the Columbia Journalism Review, The Retreat at Twin Lakes has a demographic that mirrored that of the city it was in, which was "relatively diverse—50 percent white, 30 percent Hispanic, and 20 percent black." In 2010, the community reported 326 crime incidents which ranged from homicide to burglaries. According to another source, the community was one where "very few black teens like [Trayvon Martin] live."
