= George Zimmerman =

American killer of Trayvon Martin (born 1983)

- Born: George Michael Zimmerman; October 5, 1983 (age 43); Manassas, Virginia, U.S.
- Occupation: Insurance underwriter
- Known for: Fatally shooting Trayvon Martin
- Spouse: Shellie Nicole Dean (m. 2007; div. 2013)
- Parent(s): Robert Zimmerman Sr. Gladys Mesa

George Michael Zimmerman (born October 5, 1983) is an American who fatally shot Trayvon Martin, a 17-year-old African-American, in Sanford, Florida, on February 26, 2012. On July 13, 2013, he was acquitted of second-degree murder in Florida v. George Zimmerman. After his acquittal, Zimmerman was the target of a shooting stemming from a road rage incident, the perpetrator of which was convicted of attempted murder.

After the shooting, Zimmerman continued to generate controversy, such as painting the Confederate flag, mockingly posting images of Martin's body, selling the gun he used to kill Martin, and a number of other statements described as racist and Islamophobic.

== Background ==
George Michael Zimmerman was born on October 5, 1983, in Manassas, Virginia. He is the third of four children, and his siblings include a brother, Robert Jr., and two sisters, Grace and Dawn. His mother, Gladys Cristina (née Mesa) Zimmerman, was born in Peru. His maternal great-grandfather was of Afro-Peruvian descent. His father, Robert Zimmerman Sr., is a U.S. Army veteran with a military career of 22 years, first as an Army sergeant and then 10 years at the Department of Defense. Before retiring to Florida in 2002, Zimmerman Sr. had served as a magistrate in Fairfax County's 19th Judicial District.

Zimmerman identifies as Hispanic on voter registration forms. Zimmerman's family was known for being devoutly religious. He was raised as a Catholic and served as an altar boy from age 7 to 17. Zimmerman attended All Saints Catholic School in Manassas before going to public high school. At age 14, Zimmerman joined an after-school Junior Reserve Officers' Training Corps program because he had wanted to become a Marine. When Zimmerman was 15 years old, he held three part-time jobs on nights and weekends to save up for a car. Zimmerman graduated from Osbourn High School in 2001. According to the Seminole County voter records, Zimmerman registered as a Democrat in 2002. According to his brother Robert, Zimmerman voted for Barack Obama in the 2008 U.S. presidential election. Zimmerman later became a critic of Obama.

=== Move to Florida ===
After graduating from high school, Zimmerman moved to Lake Mary, Florida, a suburb of Orlando, where he was employed by an insurance agency. Zimmerman took classes at night to obtain a license to sell insurance. It was during this time when he became friends with Lee Ann Benjamin, a real estate agent, and her husband John Donnelly, a Sanford attorney. Benjamin and Donnelly would both testify on his behalf at his trial in the death of Martin.

=== Move to the Retreat at Twin Lakes ===
Zimmerman married Shellie Dean, a licensed cosmetologist, in 2007. Two years later, they rented a townhouse in the Retreat at Twin Lakes in Sanford, Florida. Zimmerman had previously been employed at a car dealership and a mortgage audit firm. Zimmerman enrolled in Seminole State College in 2009 and was working on an associate degree in criminal justice. In December 2011 he was allowed to participate in a school graduation ceremony, although he was a course credit shy of his degree. He was completing that credit at the time of the shooting. Zimmerman was employed as an insurance underwriter. In early 2011, Zimmerman participated in a citizen forum at the Sanford City Hall to protest against the beating of a black homeless man by the son of a white Sanford police officer. During the meeting, Zimmerman claimed he witnessed "disgusting behavior" while participating in a ride-along program with local police. However, the police department said later that it did not know when, if ever, Zimmerman was in that program.

== Trayvon Martin shooting and trial ==
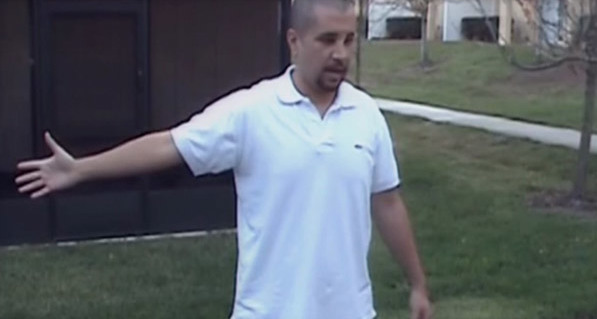
George Zimmerman, 2012

On February 26, 2012, Zimmerman fatally shot 17-year-old African-American high school student Trayvon Martin in The Retreat at Twin Lakes community in Sanford, Florida. Zimmerman was the neighborhood watch coordinator in his gated community; Martin was temporarily staying there at the time. The Twin Lakes Neighborhood Watch program was not registered with the National Neighborhood Watch Program, but was administered by the local police department. Following an earlier call from Zimmerman, police arrived within two minutes of a gunshot during an altercation in which Zimmerman fatally shot Martin, who did not possess any weapons. Zimmerman was subsequently taken into custody, treated for head injuries, and questioned for five hours.

The police chief said that Zimmerman was released because there was no evidence to refute Zimmerman's claim of having acted in self-defense. Under Florida's stand-your-ground statute, the police were prohibited by law from making an arrest. The police chief said that Zimmerman had a right to defend himself with lethal force. As news of the case spread, thousands of protesters across the United States called for Zimmerman's arrest and a full investigation. Six weeks after the shooting, amid widespread, intense, and in some cases misleading media coverage, Zimmerman was charged with murder by a special prosecutor appointed by Governor Rick Scott.

Zimmerman's trial began on June 10, 2013, in Sanford. On July 13, a jury acquitted Zimmerman of the charges of second degree murder and manslaughter. For three years, the U.S. Department of Justice (DOJ) investigated Zimmerman on civil rights charges. In February 2015, the DOJ concluded there was not sufficient evidence that Zimmerman intentionally violated the civil rights of Martin, saying the Zimmerman case did not meet the "high standard" for a federal hate crime prosecution. After DOJ said it would not charge him with a hate crime, Zimmerman said he felt free to speak his opinion "without fear of retaliation". Zimmerman criticized the government and President Obama. He believed Obama inflamed racial tensions. "He by far overstretched, overreached, even broke the law in certain aspects to where you have an innocent American being prosecuted by the federal government," Zimmerman said.

According to Zimmerman's brother, Robert Jr., in 2014, in the year following the trial, Zimmerman was both homeless and jobless. Robert Jr. said that, while he believed his brother's "state of mind" was better, Zimmerman was "a very traumatized person because he has had his liberty taken away from him". Between the shooting of Trayvon Martin and the trial, Zimmerman gained 100 to 125 pounds (45–57 kg) in about a 16-month period. He weighed over 300 pounds (136 kg) at the trial. His weight was discussed by Fox News and similar media with speculation as to how it might affect the jury's perceptions.

== Life after the trial ==
=== Car accident rescue ===
On July 17, 2013, four days after the trial verdict, Zimmerman and another man helped rescue a family of four from their overturned SUV after a single-car accident in Sanford, Florida.

=== Domestic violence arrests ===
In 2013, Zimmerman's estranged wife called 911 to report that Zimmerman had assaulted her father and was threatening her with a gun. Zimmerman was not charged over the incident. In November of that same year, Zimmerman was charged with felony aggravated assault after he allegedly pointed a shotgun at his girlfriend during a domestic violence incident. The case was later dropped. In January 2015, Zimmerman was again charged with domestic assault after allegedly throwing a wine bottle at a different girlfriend. Again the charges were later dropped.

=== Shooting by Matthew Apperson ===
On September 9, 2014, Zimmerman was named by police in a road rage incident in which another driver, later named by police as Matthew Apperson, claimed that Zimmerman followed and threatened him. Zimmerman later claimed in testimony that Apperson approached him over a rear tire leaking air, which Zimmerman was already aware of. He had explained this to Apperson before Apperson asked if Zimmerman knew he was "wrong for killing that little black boy". Zimmerman lost Apperson after the two stopped at a gas station and Zimmerman drove off.

On May 11, 2015, Apperson shot at Zimmerman while the two were driving in separate cars on a street in Lake Mary. Zimmerman was grazed by glass and metal shards when the bullet broke through his passenger-side window and was stopped by the metal window frame, causing minor facial injuries from flying glass and debris. Zimmerman flagged down a police officer and was taken to the hospital. Apperson maintained that Zimmerman was the aggressor and that Apperson acted in self-defense. Zimmerman also had a gun with him at the time of the incident, but Zimmerman's attorney said that "George absolutely denies having shown it, waved, displayed, pointed it." A Lake Mary police spokesperson stated that "the investigation has proven that George Zimmerman was not the shooter."

On May 15, 2015, Apperson was jailed in Sanford, Florida with a bond of $35,000. While free on bond, Apperson was accused, convicted and jailed for disorderly conduct, resulting in his bond being revoked. Lake Mary Police Department "learned that Apperson has exhibited unusual behaviors in which he had recently been admitted to a mental institution. It appears that Apperson has a fixation on Zimmerman and has displayed some signs of paranoia, anxiety, and bipolar disorder."

On September 22, 2015, a judge ruled Apperson would stand trial for second-degree attempted murder along with one count of aggravated assault and one count of shooting into an occupied vehicle. Apperson was convicted of attempted murder and aggravated assault with a firearm on September 16, 2016. On October 17, 2016, Apperson was sentenced to 20 years in prison on the charge of attempted second-degree murder. He was also given a 15-year concurrent sentence for aggravated assault stemming from the same incident.

=== Paintings ===
In December 2013, Zimmerman began selling paintings he had made. His first painting, of an American flag, sold for $100,099.99 on eBay in late December. On the auction page for the painting, Zimmerman wrote:

Everyone has been asking what I have been doing with myself. I found a creative way to express myself, my emotions, and the symbols that represent my experiences. My art work allows me to reflect, providing a therapeutic outlet, and allows me to remain indoors :-) I hope you enjoy owning this piece as much as I enjoyed creating it. Your friend, George Zimmerman.

It was later reported that the American flag painting was copied without attribution from a stock image taken from Shutterstock. In January 2014, the Associated Press and a Jacksonville, Florida photographer Rick Wilson demanded that Zimmerman halt the sale of one of his paintings because the news agency asserted it directly copied a photo owned by the AP. The photo and painting identically show Jacksonville-based prosecutor Angela Corey (whose office prosecuted Zimmerman for the shooting death of Martin) holding her thumb and fingers together. Zimmerman apparently made up the quote that he added to the painting: "I have this much respect for the American judicial system." The controversy was similar to that arising from the use of an AP photo by Shepard Fairey in his composition of the Barack Obama "Hope" poster. Led by attorney John Michael Phillips, the cease and desist halted the sale of this and other paintings by Zimmerman.

Painting of the Confederate battle flag, by George Zimmerman

In August 2015, Zimmerman began selling a limited number of prints of a painting of the Confederate battle flag in conjunction with gun seller Andy Hallinan of Florida Gun Supply, in Inverness, Florida. Hallinan is known for saying that Muslims were not welcome at his store, and that it was "Muslim free". Michael Walsh of Yahoo! News observed, "Zimmerman's latest painting brings together three highly controversial topics with which the nation is dealing: the deaths of young black men, the Confederate battle flag and discrimination against American Muslims."

Andrew Russeth of the New York Observer appraised Zimmerman's work as likened to paint by number. Jason Edward, a contributing editor at Art+Auction, referred to the paintings as "very primitive, the sort of thing an art critic wouldn't look at twice." Christian Viveros-Fauné, an art critic for the Village Voice, has referred to Zimmerman's artistic endeavors as constituting "murderabilia".

=== Twitter scandals ===
In late August 2015, controversy centering on Zimmerman arose when his Twitter profile picture of a Confederate flag "backed by an American flag" (in his words) became better-known. Frequently criticized posts of his from August included one in which Zimmerman called Obama an "ignorant baboon"; one in which he posted an image of Vester Lee Flanagan, an African-American former news reporter who shot and killed two ex-coworkers during a live broadcast, and wrote, "If Obama had a son..."; and another in which Zimmerman typed, in response to people who wanted him killed, that the United States understands "how it ended for the last moron that hit me" (in reference to Trayvon Martin).

In September 2015, Zimmerman retweeted a photo of Martin's slain body posted by another Twitter user, who had the caption: "Z-Man is a one man army". Several days later, Zimmerman posted a letter saying that the photo in the original tweet was marked as "sensitive" and was blocked, so he retweeted it because of the text message without seeing the photo. In December 2015, Zimmerman tweeted two photos of a topless woman he claimed was his ex-girlfriend, and accused her of cheating and of the theft of his firearm and money. He included her phone number and e-mail address on his tweet. Less than two hours later, Zimmerman's Twitter account was suspended by its administration, according to their policy against posting another person's private and confidential information, including e-mail addresses, phone numbers and familiar photos. Zimmerman's tweet included a statement against Muslims.

=== Gun sale ===
On May 11, 2016, Zimmerman posted what was planned to be the auction of the firearm he used to shoot Martin. The post, in which Zimmerman wrote that the gun was "an American Firearm icon", attracted controversy. Zimmerman subsequently explained that the Justice Department had recently returned the weapon to him. He said that he had the right as owner to sell it. Zimmerman said the proceeds of the weapon would go to combating the violence against police officers by members of the Black Lives Matter movement as well as "ensure the demise of Angela Corey's persecution career and Hillary Clinton's anti-firearm rhetoric". After selling the weapon, Zimmerman said that he had chosen to sell it directly as a result of Clinton "stumping around for a false campaign for the Trayvon Martin Foundation" and accused her of lying about the events of the shooting.

Though the auction was set to take place May 12, the weapon listing was removed before the auction was scheduled to begin. The original auction site, GunBroker.com, released a statement stating that they wanted no part in the listing or any of the publicity related to it. Zimmerman reposted the firearm on another site, United Gun Group. Within minutes, the site went down because of the intense traffic prompted by the listing. As bidding proceeded, purported bidders began using fake names such as "Donald Trump" and "Tamir Rice" to place large bids on the weapon, which were interpreted as a joke. Martin Shkreli expressed genuine interest so that he could either destroy the firearm or place it in a museum. Moderators on the bidding sites caught additional scam actions. On May 20, Zimmerman said he had accepted a bid of $250,000 for the weapon.

=== Bar incident and alleged use of racial slur ===
On November 11, 2016, it was reported that Zimmerman had been kicked out of a bar in Central Florida. A deputy had been called to the bar in order to investigate a claim of battery involving a female friend of Zimmerman, and was reviewing surveillance footage with the manager when Zimmerman began yelling at a waitress. According to the manager, this was one of several incidents started by Zimmerman, and that he wanted him removed for trespassing. The female employee told the police that she had attempted to collect the group's bill, before Zimmerman snatched the credit card from her hand and began yelling at her. The manager also claimed that Zimmerman used a racial slur. Zimmerman also claimed that Floyd L. Narcisse, a 38-year old black pastor, had hit him on the shoulder twice, although (according to the incident report) surveillance video and witness reports showed Narcisse tapping his shoulder in an attempt to speak with Zimmerman. The deputy then tried to get Zimmerman to fill out a sworn voluntary form, with Zimmerman then complaining about the officer and writing "I want to press charges. The narrative on the front is true and correct. Officer Nickell is an incompetent officer under qualified to flip burgers," and told the officer that he would sue the Seminole County Sheriff's office.

=== Stalking case ===
In May 2018, Zimmerman was charged with misdemeanor stalking. He was accused of threatening and harassing Dennis Warren, a private investigator hired by Cinemart Productions which was producing Rest in Power: The Trayvon Martin Story, a documentary about the killing of Trayvon Martin. In September 2017, Warren left a voicemail for Zimmerman asking for an interview in the documentary. Another producer of the documentary reported receiving threats from Zimmerman after reaching out to his family members. In a nine-day span, Zimmerman called Warren 55 times, left 36 voicemails, texted him 67 times and sent 27 emails. A Seminole County sergeant who reached out to Zimmerman about the allegations in January 2018 was berated and called a "whore" by Zimmerman. In November 2018, Zimmerman entered a plea of no contest, receiving 12 months of probation and a 10-year court order prohibiting contact with Warren.

=== Lawsuits ===
On December 4, 2019, Zimmerman sued the Martin family and others involved in the trial for $100 million on grounds of false evidence and abuse of process. The suit was dismissed by a judge in February 2022, who found no evidence to support any of Zimmerman's claims. On February 18, 2020, Zimmerman filed a defamation lawsuit for $265 million against Pete Buttigieg and Elizabeth Warren. The suit was dismissed in February 2021 on the grounds, as the judge stated, that Zimmerman had "failed to sufficiently allege an essential element of defamation."

== Popular culture ==
Zimmerman was satirized in the South Park episode "World War Zimmerman", which premiered on Comedy Central in the United States on October 9, 2013. It parodies World War Z and the George Zimmerman murder trials. In 2013, Public Policy Polling included Zimmerman as a potential Republican Party presidential candidate in an Alaska poll testing what person the state would support in the 2016 presidential election. Tom Jensen, director of Public Policy Polling, explained in an email that his firm had included Zimmerman because of his popularity among conservatives and curiosity as to "how he would do." In the survey, Zimmerman received 2% of support among Alaskans.
