= Stand-your-ground law =

Justification defense in a criminal case

A stand-your-ground law, sometimes called a "line in the sand" or "no duty to retreat" law, provides that people may use deadly force when they reasonably believe it to be necessary to defend against certain violent crimes (right of self-defense). Under such a law, people have no duty to retreat before using deadly force in self-defense, so long as they are in a place where they are lawfully present. The exact details vary by jurisdiction.

The alternative to stand your ground is "duty to retreat". In jurisdictions that implement a duty to retreat, even a person who is unlawfully attacked (or who is defending someone who is unlawfully attacked) may not use deadly force if it is possible to instead avoid the danger with complete safety by retreating.

Even areas that impose a duty to retreat generally follow the "castle doctrine", under which people have no duty to retreat when they are attacked in their homes, or (in some places) in their vehicles or workplaces. The castle doctrine and "stand-your-ground" laws provide legal defenses to persons who have been charged with various use-of-force crimes against persons, such as murder, manslaughter, aggravated assault, and illegal discharge or brandishing of weapons, as well as attempts to commit such crimes.

Whether a jurisdiction follows stand-your-ground or duty-to-retreat is just one element of its self-defense laws. Different jurisdictions allow deadly force against different crimes. Every state in the United States allows the use of deadly force against imminent deadly force, great bodily injury, and likely kidnapping or rape; some also allow it against threat of robbery and burglary.

== Jurisdictions ==
=== Canada ===
In Canada, there is no duty to retreat under the law. Canada's laws regarding self-defence are similar in nature to those of England, as they centre around the acts committed, and whether those acts are considered reasonable in the circumstances. Generally where retreat is available in the circumstances, the decision to stand your ground is more likely to be unreasonable. The sections of the Canadian criminal code that deal with self-defence or defence of property are sections 34 and 35, respectively. These sections were updated in 2012 to clarify the code, and to help legal professionals apply the law in accordance with the values Canadians hold to be acceptable.

A great deal of case law has emerged from different provincial superior courts regarding the interpretation of the elements of self-defence per ss. 34-35 of the Criminal Code. In Ontario, jurors are not permitted "...to consider whether an accused could have retreated from his or her own home in the face of an attack (or threatened attack) by an assailant in assessing the elements of self-defence.” In British Columbia, the leading case law of which predates the 2012 ss. 34-35 amendments, courts will permit juries to consider available lines of retreat in deciding whether an accused had no other option than to defend himself. However, the option of retreat is not considered a categorical exclusion from self-defence.

==== Alberta ====
The province of Alberta is unique among Canadian jurisdictions in affording civil immunity to occupiers who employ force, including lethal force, in defense of homes and other premises. In 2019, the Alberta legislature passed the Trespass Statutes (Protecting Law-Abiding Property Owners) Amendment Act, 2019, in response to rising rural crime, public concern with police inaction and several high-profile self-defense shootings the previous year. Especially influential was the case of Edouard Maurice, who wounded a trespasser and was served with a lawsuit after having criminal charges against him dropped.

The new Act amended the Occupiers Liability Act, 2000 and added the following sections:

(2) Where a trespasser is not a criminal trespasser, an occupier is not liable to the trespasser for damages for death of or injury to the trespasser unless the death or injury results from the occupier’s wilful or reckless conduct.

(3) Where a trespasser is a criminal trespasser, no action lies against the occupier for damages for death of or injury to the trespasser unless the death or injury is caused by conduct of the occupier that

(a) is wilful and grossly disproportionate in the circumstances, and

(b) results in the occupier being convicted of an offence under the Criminal Code (Canada) that is prosecuted by indictment.

(4) For the purposes of subsections (2) and (3), a trespasser is a criminal trespasser if the occupier has reasonable grounds to believe that the trespasser is committing or is about to commit an offence under the Criminal Code (Canada).

(5) For the purposes of subsection (3), an occupier is deemed not to be convicted of an offence until the period limited by law for the commencement of an appeal from the conviction has elapsed or the appeal taken from the conviction has concluded or been abandoned.

=== Czech Republic ===
Czech law abandoned the duty to retreat in 1852. Since then, the successive recodifications of criminal law lacked any such requirement. In order for a defense to be judged as legitimate, it may not be "manifestly disproportionate to the manner of the attack".

=== England and Wales ===
The common law jurisdiction of England and Wales has a stand-your-ground law rooted in the common law defense of using reasonable force in self-defense.

In English common law there is no duty to retreat before a person may use reasonable force against an attacker, nor need a person wait to be attacked before using such force, but one who chooses not to retreat, when retreat would be a safe and easy option, might find it harder to justify his use of force as 'reasonable'.

Any force used must be reasonable in the circumstances as the person honestly perceived them to be, after making allowance for the fact that some degree of excess force might still be reasonable in the heat of the moment.

In the home, the householder is protected by an additional piece of legislation in which it is specified that force used against an intruder is not to be regarded as reasonable if it is 'grossly disproportionate' (as distinct from merely 'disproportionate' force, which can still be reasonable).

=== France ===
Like England and Wales, France has a stand-your-ground law rooted in the defense of using reasonable force in self-defense.

Under article 122-5 of French Criminal Code, a person who, faced with an unjustified attack on himself or another, at the same time performs an act required by the need for self-defense of himself or another, is not criminally responsible, unless there is a disproportion between the means of defense used and the seriousness of the attack. There is no duty to retreat before a person may use reasonable force against an attacker, nor need a person wait to be attacked before using such force, but one who chooses not to retreat, when retreat would be a safe and easy option, might find it harder to justify his use of force by the need for self-defense.

Any force used must be reasonable in the circumstances as the person honestly perceived them to be, after making allowance for the fact that some degree of excess force might still be reasonable in the heat of the moment. The person who performs the act is presumed to have acted in self-defense: 1° when repelling, by night, the entry by break-in, violence or trickery in an inhabited place; 2° when defending himself against the authors of robbery or looting executed with violence.

There is an explicit exception however for homicide: one cannot argue that a homicide was in self-defense.

=== Germany ===
German law permits self-defense against an unlawful attack. If there is no other possibility for defense, it is generally allowed to use even deadly force without a duty to retreat. However, there must not be an extreme imbalance ("extremes Missverhältnis") between the defended right and the chosen method of defense. In particular, in a case in which firearms are used, a warning shot must be given when defending a mere material asset. If the self-defense was excessive, its perpetrator is not to be punished if he or she exceeded on account of confusion, fear or terror.

=== Ireland ===
Under the terms of the Criminal Law (Defence and the Dwelling) Act 2011, property owners or residents are entitled to defend themselves with force, up to and including lethal force. Any individual who uses force against a trespasser is not guilty of an offense if he or she honestly believes they were there to commit a criminal act and a threat to life. However, there is a further provision which requires that the reaction to the intruder is such that another reasonable person in the same circumstances would likely employ it. This provision acts as a safeguard against grossly disproportionate use of force, while still allowing a person to use force in nearly all circumstances.

The law was introduced in response to DPP v. Padraig Nally.

=== Italy ===
In 2019, the Italian senate passed a "legitimate defense" bill, protecting the right to self-defense for private citizens of Italy.

=== Poland ===
Stand-your-ground law applies to any kind of threat by an attacker that endangers the victim's safety, health, or life. The victim has no obligation to retreat, as said in a statement by the Supreme Court of Poland on February 4, 1972: "The assaulted person is under no obligation either to escape or hide from the assailant in a locked room, nor to endure the assault restricting his freedom, but has the right to repel the assault with all available means that are necessary to force the assailant to refrain from continuing his assault."

Section 2a of the Polish Penal Code introduced in 2017 codifies a limited castle doctrine, by excluding punishment if the defendant used excessive force while protecting one's home unless "exceeding the limits of necessary defense was gross".

If the self-defense was excessive, its perpetrator is not to be punished if he or she exceeded on account of fear or rage justified by the circumstances of the attack.

=== United States ===
==== Laws ====
Stand your ground law by US jurisdiction: Stand-your-ground by statute Stand-your-ground by judicial decision or jury instruction Middle-ground approach Duty to retreat except in one's home, vehicle or workplace Duty to retreat except in one's home or workplace Duty to retreat except in one's home

- Thirty-eight states are stand-your-ground states, all but eight by statutes providing "that there is no duty to retreat from an attacker in any place in which one is lawfully present": Alabama, Alaska, Arizona, Arkansas, Florida, Georgia, Idaho, Indiana, Iowa, Kansas, Kentucky, Louisiana, Michigan, Mississippi, Missouri, Montana, Nevada, New Hampshire, North Carolina, North Dakota, Ohio, Oklahoma, Pennsylvania, South Carolina, South Dakota, Tennessee, Texas, Utah, West Virginia, and Wyoming; Puerto Rico is also stand-your-ground. Of these, at least eleven include "may stand his or her ground" language (Alabama, Florida, Georgia, Idaho, Kansas, Kentucky, Louisiana, Oklahoma, Pennsylvania, South Carolina, and South Dakota.) Pennsylvania limits the no-duty-to-retreat principle to situations where the defender is resisting attack with a deadly weapon.
- The other eight states have case law/precedent or jury instructions so providing: California, Colorado, Illinois, New Mexico, Oregon, Vermont, Virginia, and Washington; the Commonwealth of the Northern Mariana Islands also falls within this category.
- Eleven states impose a duty to retreat when one can do so with absolute safety: Connecticut, Delaware, Hawaii, Maine, Maryland, Massachusetts, Minnesota, Nebraska, New Jersey, New York and Rhode Island. New York, however, does not require retreat when one is threatened with robbery, burglary, kidnapping, or sexual assault.
- Washington, D.C. adopts a "middle ground" approach, under which "The law does not require a person to retreat," but "in deciding whether [defendant] reasonably at the time of the incident believed that s/he was in imminent danger of death or serious bodily harm and that deadly force was necessary to repel that danger, you may consider, along with any other evidence, whether the [defendant] could have safely retreated ... but did not." Wisconsin also adopts a "middle ground" approach, where "while there is no statutory duty to retreat, whether the opportunity to retreat was available goes to whether the defendant reasonably believed the force used was necessary to prevent an interference with his or her person."
- There is no settled rule on the subject in American Samoa and the U.S. Virgin Islands.
- In all duty to retreat states, the duty to retreat does not apply when the defender is in the defender's home (except, in some jurisdictions, when the defender is defending against a fellow occupant of that home). This is known as a "castle doctrine".
- In Connecticut, Delaware, Hawaii, and Nebraska, the duty to retreat also does not apply when the defender is in the defender's place of work; the same is true in Wisconsin and Guam, but only if the defender is the owner or operator of the workplace.
- In Wisconsin and Guam, the duty to retreat also does not apply when the defender is in the defender's vehicle.
- Twenty-two states have laws that "provide civil immunity under certain self-defense circumstances" (Arizona, Arkansas, Colorado, Florida, Georgia, Idaho, Illinois, Kentucky, Louisiana, Maryland, Michigan, Montana, New Hampshire, North Carolina, North Dakota, Oklahoma, Ohio, Pennsylvania, South Carolina, Tennessee, West Virginia, and Wisconsin). At least six states have laws stating that "civil remedies are unaffected by criminal provisions of self-defense law" (Hawaii, Missouri, Nebraska, New Jersey, North Dakota, and Tennessee).

==== Controversy ====
Stand-your-ground laws are frequently labeled "shoot first" laws by opposition groups, including the Brady Campaign to Prevent Gun Violence. In Florida, self-defense claims tripled in the years following enactment. Opponents argue that Florida's law makes it potentially more difficult to prosecute cases against individuals who commit a crime and claim self-defense. Before passage of the law, Miami police chief John F. Timoney called the law unnecessary and dangerous in that "[w]hether it's trick-or-treaters or kids playing in the yard of someone who doesn't want them there or some drunk guy stumbling into the wrong house, you're encouraging people to possibly use deadly physical force where it shouldn't be used." A counterargument is that implementing a duty-to-retreat places the safety of the criminal above a victim's own life.

In Florida, a task force created by former Democratic state senator Chris Smith of Fort Lauderdale found the law to be "confusing". Those discussing issues with the group included Buddy Jacobs, a lawyer representing the Florida Prosecuting Attorneys Association. Jacobs recommended the law's repeal, stating that modifying the law would not fix its problems. In a July 16, 2013 speech in the wake of the jury verdict acquitting George Zimmerman of charges stemming from the shooting death of Trayvon Martin, Attorney General Eric Holder criticized stand-your-ground laws as "senselessly expand[ing] the concept of self-defense and sow[ing] dangerous conflict in our neighborhoods."

In 2014, Florida's legislature considered a bill that would allow people to show a gun or fire a warning shot during a confrontation without drawing a lengthy prison sentence. In 2017, there was a bill proposed in Florida's state legislature that would require the prosecution to prove that a defendant's use of self-defense was not valid. In 2018, the shooting of Markeis McGlockton led some civil rights activists and politicians to call for abolition of the statute.

==== Racial disparity ====
In 2012, in response to the Trayvon Martin case, the Tampa Bay Times compiled a report on the application of stand your ground, and also created a database of cases where defendants sought to invoke the law. The database included many cases that were not legally stand your ground, such as when the defender was in the home or had no safe opportunity to flee, so care must be taken in its evaluation in regards to stand your ground law. Their report found no racial disparity in Florida cases in which defendants claiming self-defense under the law are prosecuted, with Caucasian subjects being charged and convicted at the same rate as African American subjects, and results of mixed-race cases were similar for both white victims of black attackers and black victims of white attackers. Victims of African American attackers overall were more successful at using the law than victims of Caucasian attackers, regardless of the victim's race claiming self-defense, but analysis showed that black attackers were also more likely to be armed and to be involved in committing a crime, such as burglary, when shot.

A Texas A&M study found that when whites use the stand-your-ground defense against black attackers they are more successful than when blacks use the defense against white attackers. According to The Urban Institute in 2014, in Stand Your Ground states, white-on-black homicides were 354 percent more likely to be ruled justified than white-on-white homicides. A 2013 paper from The Urban Institute analysing FBI data found that in stand-your-ground states, the use of the defense by whites in the shooting of a black person was found to be justifiable 17 percent of the time, while the defense when used by blacks in the shooting of a white person was successful 1 percent of the time. In non-stand-your-ground states, the shooting of a black person by a white was found justified approximately 9 percent of the time, while the shooting of a white person by a black was found justified approximately 1 percent of the time. The paper's author noted that the data used do not detail the circumstances of the shooting, which could be a source of the disparity. They also noted that the total number of shootings in the FBI dataset of black victims by whites was 25. A 2015 study found that cases with white victims are two times more likely to result in convictions under Florida's stand your ground law than cases with black victims, although the study did not exclude many cases that were not legally stand your ground under the law.

==== Effects on crime ====
A 2018 RAND Corporation review of existing research concluded that "there is moderate evidence that stand-your-ground laws may increase homicide rates and limited evidence that the laws increase firearm homicides in particular." In 2019, RAND authors published an update, writing "Since publication of RAND's report, at least four additional studies meeting RAND's standards of rigor have reinforced the finding that "stand your ground" laws increase homicides. None of them found that "stand your ground" laws deter violent crime. No rigorous study has yet determined whether "stand your ground" laws promote legitimate acts of self-defense. A 2020 RAND Corporation review of existing research concluded: "There is supportive evidence that stand-your-ground laws are associated with increases in firearm homicides and moderate evidence that they increase the total number of homicides."

A 2017 study in the Journal of Human Resources found that Stand Your Ground laws led to an increase in homicides and hospitalizations related to firearm-inflicted injuries. The study estimated that at least 30 people died per month due to the laws. A 2013 study in the Journal of Human Resources found that Stand Your Ground laws in states across the U.S. "do not deter burglary, robbery, or aggravated assault. In contrast, they lead to a statistically significant 8 percent net increase in the number of reported murders." A 2016 study in the Social Science Journal found that stand-your-ground laws were not associated with lower crime rates. A 2016 study in the Journal of the American Medical Association compared homicide rates in Florida following the passage of its "stand your ground" self-defense law to the rates in four control states, New Jersey, New York, Ohio and Virginia, which have no similar laws. It found that the law was associated with a 24.4% increase in homicide and a 31.6% increase in firearm-related homicide, but no change in rates of suicide or suicide by firearm, between 2005 and 2014. It noted that, "[c]ircumstances unique to Florida may have contributed to our findings, including those that we could not identify," and "[o]ur study examined the effect of the Florida law on homicide and homicide by firearm, not on crime and public safety". The study was criticized by researcher and gun rights advocate John Lott, for studying only one state and focusing on a narrow definition of effectiveness. Studies conducted by Lott's Crime Prevention Research Center found that the loosening of restrictions on defensive gun use, including “stand your ground laws”, led to a decrease in crime overall. Self-defense law subject matter expert Andrew Branca was critical of the AMA study for not distinguishing between justifiable homicides and murder, and for relying solely on statutory laws while overlooking case law (i.e. Virginia) in determining the data set. The study's methodology was defended by Duke University professor Jeffrey Swanson for its use of other states as controls, saying "[t]hey look at comparable trends in states that didn't pass the law and don't see the effect.".

In a 2007 National District Attorneys Association symposium, numerous concerns were voiced that the law could increase crime. This included criminals using the law as a defense for their crimes, more people carrying guns, and that people would not feel safe if they felt that anyone could use deadly force in a conflict. The report also noted that the misinterpretation of clues could result in the use of deadly force when there was, in fact, no danger. The report specifically notes that racial and ethnic minorities could be at greater risk because of negative stereotypes.

A 2012 study examined whether a prominent Stand Your Ground shooting, Joe Horn shooting controversy, in 2007, which brought public attention to Texas' stand-your-ground law impacted crime. The study found that subsequent to the shooting, burglaries decreased significantly in Houston, but not in Dallas, over a 20-month period. A 2015 study found that the adoption of Oklahoma's stand-your-ground law was associated with a decrease in residential burglaries, but also that the law had "the unintended consequence of increasing the number of non-residential burglaries."

Florida's stand-your-ground law went into effect on October 1, 2005. Florida state representative Dennis Baxley, an author of the law, said that the violent crime rate has dropped since the enactment of the law, though he said there may be many reasons for the change. Others have argued that the law may lead to an increase in crime. Violent crime data for 1995–2015 has been published by the Florida Department of Law Enforcement.
