= Criminal Law Act =

Stock short title used for legislation

Criminal Law Act (with its many variations) is a stock short title used for legislation in the Kingdom of Great Britain and later in the United Kingdom, as well as in the Republic of Ireland and the Republic of Singapore. The term encompasses acts relating to the criminal law, including both substantive and procedural aspects of that law. The term sometimes tends to be used for Acts that do not have a single cohesive subject matter.

More recently, the Bill for an Act with this short title will have been known as a Criminal Law Bill during its passage through Parliament.

Criminal Law Acts may be a generic name either for legislation bearing that short title or for all legislation which relates to the criminal law.

See also Criminal Justice Act and Criminal Law Amendment Act.

== List ==
=== Kingdom of Great Britain ===
The Criminal Law Act 1772 (12 Geo. 3. c. 31), long titled, "An Act for the more effectual proceeding against persons standing mute on their arraignment for a felony, or piracy."
The Criminal Law Act 1776 (16 Geo. 3. c. 43), long-titled, "An act to authorise, for a limited time, the punishment by hard labour of offenders who, for certain crimes, are or shall become liable to be transported to any of his Majesty's colonies and plantations." The act temporarily suspends the Transportation Act 1717, instituting a penal policy of hard labour instead. The act is also referred to as the 'Hard Labour' Act or the 'Hulks Act.'
The Criminal Law Act 1778 (18 Geo. 3. c. 62), continues suspension under the Criminal Law Act 1776.
The Criminal Law Act 1779 (19 Geo. 3. c. 54), again continues suspension under the Criminal Law Act 1776.
The Criminal Law Act 1781 (21 Geo. 3. c. 68), long-titled, "An act to explain and amend an act, made in the fourth year of his late Majesty King George the Second, intituled, An act for more efficiently punishing stealers of lead and iron bars, fixed to houses, or any Fences belonging thereunto."
The second Criminal Law Act 1781 (21 Geo. 3. c. 69), long-titled, "An act to explain and amend an act, made in the twenty-ninth year of his late Majesty King George the Second, intituled, An act for more efficiently discouraging and preventing the stealing, and the buying and receiving of stolen lead, iron, copper, brass, bell-metal, and solder; and for more effectually bringing the offenders to justice."
The Criminal Law Act 1782 (22 Geo. 3. c. 40), long-titled, "An Act for punishing Persons wilfully and maliciously destroying any woolen, silk, linen, or cotton goods, or any Implements prepared for, or used, in the manufacture thereof; and for repealing so much of two acts, made in the twelfth year of King George the First, and in the sixth year of his present Majesty, as relates to the punishment of persons destroying any woollen or silk manufactures, or any Implements prepared for or used therein."
The second Criminal Law Act 1782 (22 Geo. 3. c. 58), long-titled, "An Act for the more easy discovery and effectual punishment of buyers and receivers of stolen goods."

=== United Kingdom ===
The Criminal Law Act 1826 (7 Geo. 4. c. 64)
The Criminal Law Act 1827 (7 & 8 Geo. 4. c. 28) (Repealed by the Criminal Law Act 1967, s.10(2) & Sch.3, Pt.III)
The Criminal Law Act 1967 (c. 58)
The Criminal Law Act 1977 (c. 45)

==== Scotland ====
The Criminal Law (Scotland) Act 1829 (10 Geo. 4. c. 38)
The Criminal Law (Scotland) Act 1830 (11 Geo. 4 & 1 Will. 4. c. 37)
The Criminal Law (Consolidation) (Scotland) Act 1995 (c. 39)

==== Northern Ireland ====
The Criminal Law Act (Northern Ireland) 1967 (c. 18 (N.I.))

=== Republic of Ireland ===
The Criminal Law (Jurisdiction) Act 1976 (No 14)
The Criminal Law Act 1976 (No 32)
The Criminal Law (Rape) Act 1981 (No 10)
The Criminal Law (Rape) (Amendment) Act 1990 (No 32)
The Criminal Law (Suicide) Act 1993 (No 11)
The Criminal Law (Sexual Offences) Act 1993 (No 20)
The Criminal Law (Incest Proceedings) Act 1995 (No 12)
The Criminal Law Act 1997 (No 14)
The Criminal Law (Insanity) Act 2006 (No 11)
The Criminal Law (Sexual Offences) Act 2006 (No 15)
The Criminal Law (Sexual Offences) (Amendment) Act 2007 (No 6)
The Criminal Law (Human Trafficking) Act 2008 (No 8)
The Criminal Law (Defence and the Dwelling) Act 2011 (No 35)

=== Republic of Singapore ===
The Criminal Law (Temporary Provisions) Act

== See also ==
List of short titles
