= McGlockton =

McGlockton is a surname. Notable people with the surname include:

- Chester McGlockton (1969–2011), American football player
- Markeis McGlockton (1990–2018), American shooting victim
