= Boca Ciega High School =

Location
- 924 58th Street South; Gulfport, Florida 33707-2548; United States
- Coordinates: 27.760712°N 82.711944°W

Information
- School type: Public, secondary
- Motto: Deeds are Ours–Results are God's
- Opened: September 1953
- School district: Pinellas County Schools
- Principal: Jennifer M.Gil
- Teaching staff: 67.00 (FTE)
- Grades: 9–12
- Gender: Coeducational
- Enrollment: 1,211 (2023-2024)
- Student to teacher ratio: 18.07
- Campus size: 40 acres (160,000 m^{2})
- Campus type: Suburban
- Colors: Gold, white and navy
- Fight song: "Colonel Bogey March"
- Nickname: Pirates
- Accreditation: Florida Department of Education
- Newspaper: Hi-Tide Online
- Yearbook: Treasure Chest
- Website: Boca Ciega High School

The Boca Ciega High School (BCHS), known locally as "Bogie", is an American four-year public high school in Gulfport, Florida, just south of the St. Petersburg city line, and is part of the Pinellas County Schools district. The school has a student enrollment of 1,724 and 87 teachers (FTE) (2018–19 school year).

The Boca Ciega students' nickname is the Pirates and its colors are gold, white, and navy (previously gold, white and red). Its interscholastic teams compete in the Pinellas County Athletic Conference.

BCHS juniors and seniors with a grade point average of 3.0 and higher may be eligible to earn high school and college credit through dual enrollment coursework at St. Petersburg College.

Opened in 1953, a new campus on the current site was completed in 2012.

== History ==
Ground was broken for a $1.34-million school in December 1952, the first new high school built in southern Pinellas County in 26 years. It was open-air with a central administration building and classrooms extending out in a series of parallel wings to take advantage of the Florida weather by providing maximum natural light and exposure for each classroom. In July 1953, the school board chose Boca Ciega (after the nearby bay) as the school's name over Gulfport, Sunshine City, Sun City, Central, Gulf Coast, 58th Street, and Southwest St. Petersburg. Prospective students chose gold (for the Sun) and white (for sand) as the school colors and "Rebels" as the nickname. In September 1953, BCHS opened with 964 students in grades 9–12. The first principal, Richard L. Jones, declared there would be no "rebels" at his school; in another vote, students chose "Pirates." Ironically, Rebels was later adopted as the nickname of the school's cross-town rival, Dixie Hollins High School. The school's alma mater (anthem) was arranged by George Shakley, with words by Kathryn Ludlum (revised by Robert Drick in 1976).

BCHS seal

On March 13, 1954, Christine J. Baker, choir director from 1953 to 1972, directed the first spring concert. She supervised several singing groups, notably the Baker's Dozen, who performed at the 1964 New York World's Fair after raising $12,000 to make the trip. The school band performed in Nassau, Bahamas on April 23, 1960, the first out-of-the-country performance by a St. Petersburg-area high school. In April 1969, the band visited Bogotá, Colombia. On July 11, 1976, the BCHS Jazz Band performed at the US Bicentennial celebration at Independence Hall in Philadelphia. The 1964 Mrs. America Pageant was held at the BCHS auditorium.

In 1967, a portion of the student body was transferred to the new Lakewood High School. Gordon Young became principal in 1968. Boca Ciega, by then only grades 10–12, had been an all-white school until 1967 when one black student was enrolled that year. Then in 1968, 85 black students were transferred from then-overcrowded Lakewood High. It led to the first of several racial disturbances at the school over the next five years, the first on April 23, 1969. Court-ordered desegregation took place in 1971, which sparked a week of racial disturbances in December. Hugh B. Kriever became principal in 1973. That year, racial violence again broke out at the school on February 5; and on April 11, which was later labeled by a hearing examiner as "a full-fledged racial riot".

In September 1970, BCHS students organized to fight for the abolition of the county-wide student dress and grooming code, which had been liberalized that spring through student pressure. The movement spread to other schools and the code was finally relaxed in January 1971.

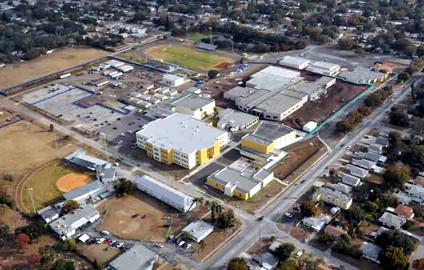
BCHS campus in 2011, looking southeast

John C. Demps was named principal in 1976. Drainage renovations were completed in 1980, improving swampy conditions on campus which had been prone to flooding. In 1986, BCHS received a $24,500 federal grant and implemented a campaign to restore the school's image and spirit. The buildings received a fresh coat of paint, and parents, students and staff re-discovered the words to the fight song thanks to Mary Ann Frey, a teacher who was a 1968 graduate. In January 1987, Barbara Paonessa became the first woman (and longest-serving) principal until May 2003. An Army Junior ROTC program was established in 1988.

Boca Ciega underwent a major renovation from 1990 to 1993, which included a new music building (named in memory of Baker), remodeling the gymnasium (named in memory of basketball coach Kenneth T. Robinson), restructuring the administration building and installing central air conditioning. Classrooms were restored, asbestos floor tiles were removed and carpeting installed. The auditorium and library were updated. In the fall of 1997, the 20,000-square-foot (1,900 m^{2}) Center for Wellness and Medical Professions magnet facility opened. John M. Leanes served as principal from 2004 until his retirement in April 2007, followed by Paula-Gene Nelson.

Michael Vigue became principal in October 2010. During the 2011–12 school year, students and teachers noted a reduction in student disturbances and credited Vigue, as well as the new enclosed buildings which limit walking outside in open-air hallways.

=== New campus ===
Construction of a new campus began in January 2008 on the existing site. While BCHS remained occupied and functional, demolition and new construction proceeded in phases throughout the campus. The new school was built using the Daggett Model School concept and features different buildings, or "learning communities", for each grade. The existing gym; field house; and music, and medical magnet buildings were renovated. A new 103,000-square-foot (9,600 m^{2}) administration, media center, cafeteria and classroom building opened on October 28, 2011. New softball and baseball fields were also built.

The 266,600-square-foot (24,770 m^{2}) facility, built on a 40-acre site, can accommodate up to 2,550 students. The $67 million cost made it the most expensive high school project in Pinellas County history.

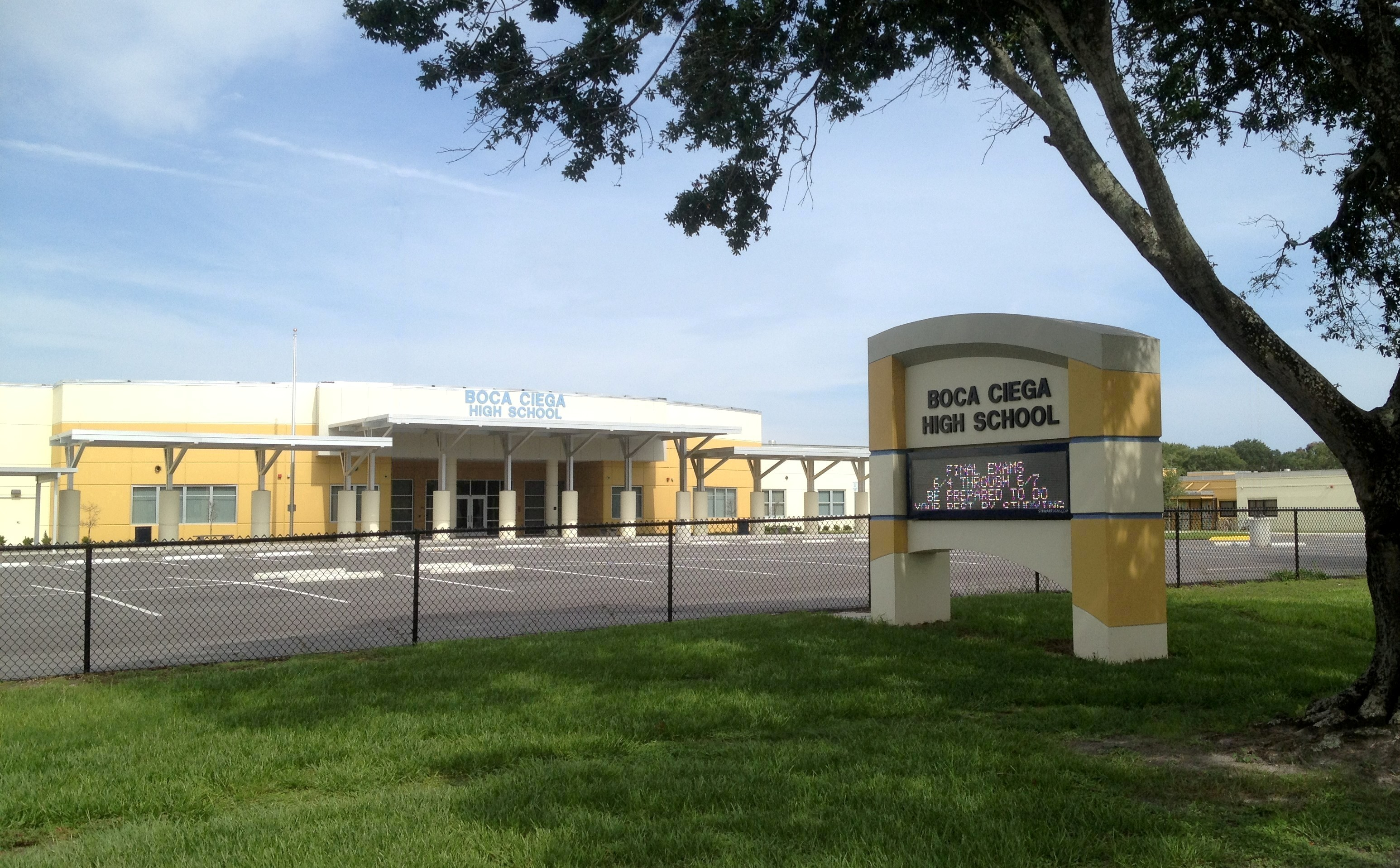
Administration building and main entrance

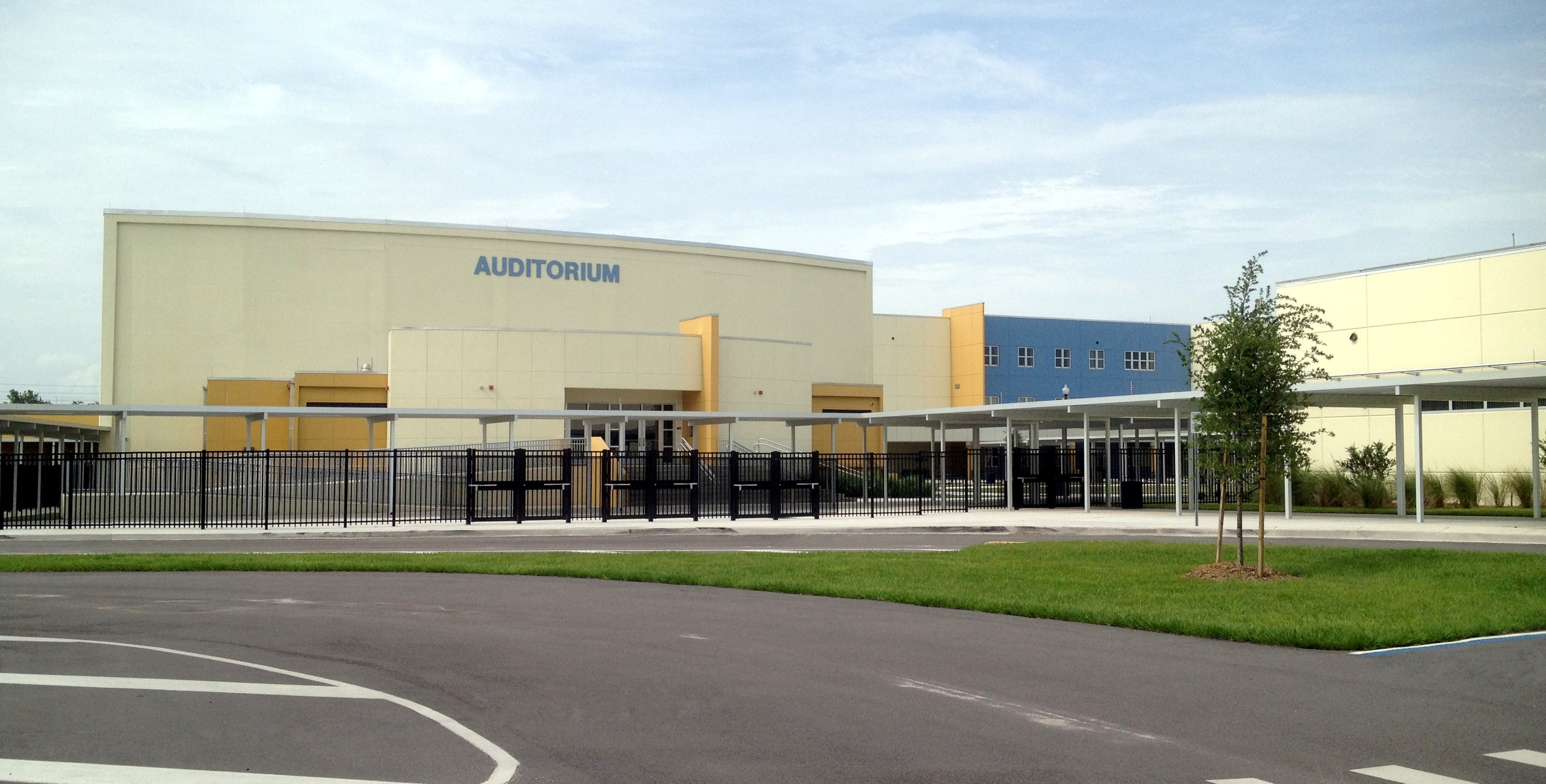
Auditorium

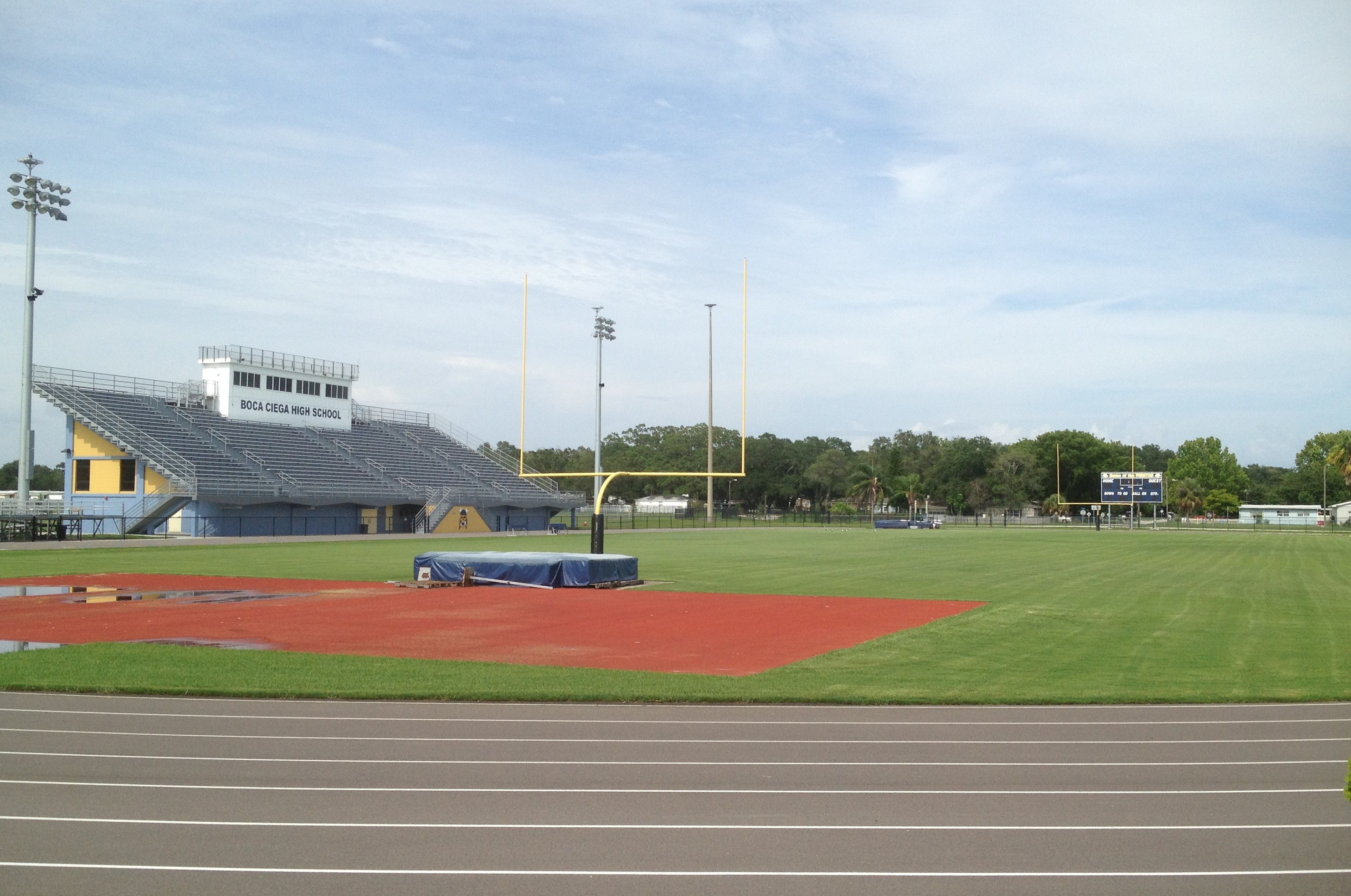
Grandstand, track and football field

== Athletics ==
In its inaugural 1953 football game, BCHS defeated Gulf High School of New Port Richey 24–6. The first homecoming events were held November 18, 1954. The next night, BCHS lost to Jacksonville's DuPont High in football 33–13. In the first athletic meeting between the two schools in January 1954, St. Petersburg High School defeated Boca Ciega 43–39 in basketball as 2,100 fans packed St. Pete High's gym.

A field house and 2,250-seat bleachers were added to the football field in 1962 and were ready for the 1963 season. During August 1966, the Miami Dolphins practiced at BCHS before their first season in the NFL while using St. Pete Beach as their training camp.

In November 1987, the football stadium was dedicated in memory of Charles C. Beauchamp, who died in 1967 from injuries playing baseball for BCHS. A Sports Hall of Fame was established in December 1993.

From 1992 to 2011, the Lady Pirates basketball team reached the playoffs for 19 seasons, the third-longest streak in the state; including two consecutive Class 5A state championships.

A youth football and cheerleading league team, the Gulfport Pirates, began play at BCHS in 2012.

As part of the recent renovations, new baseball, softball, and tennis fields were also completed in time for spring season 2013.

=== Championships ===
(Reference: Florida High School Athletic Association Championship Record Books)

- 1957: Basketball Western Conference champions
- 1958–61: Baseball 2A District 5 champions
- 1959: Football city champions
- 1961: Football city champions
- 1971: Football city champions, conference co-champions and 4A district champions; 9–2 record
- 1986: Boys basketball 3A state champions
- 1994: Boys basketball 4A state champions
- 1995: Girls basketball 5A state champions
- 1996: Girls basketball 5A state champions
- 2007: Football 4A district champions
- 2008: Girls basketball conference and regional champions (5A state Final Four)
- 2009: Girls basketball conference and regional champions (5A state Final Four)
- 2010: Girls basketball conference and regional champions (5A state Final Two); 30–2 record
- 2010: Boys bowling handicap and scratch champions
- 2011: Girls basketball district champions (sixth straight season)
- 2015: Boys soccer district champions (District 3A)
- 2015: Boys baseball district champions (District 5A)

== Notable alumni ==
Boca Ciega has an estimated 28,000 graduates.

Notable alumni include:

- Angela Bassett (1976), actress
- Josh Bellamy (2007), former wide receiver for the Chicago Bears
- Barbara Bosson (1957), actress
- Darrell Clanton, country music artist
- Darren Howard, former NFL player
- Rick Kriseman, politician
- Hal Lanier, former Major League Baseball player
- Markeis McGlockton (drop out), shooting victim
- Dallas Moore, (born 1994), professional basketball player
- Jamar Newsome (2011–14), wide receiver for the Kansas City Chiefs
- Speedy Smith (born 1993), basketball player for Hapoel Jerusalem of the Israeli Basketball Premier League
- Ricky Steamboat (1971), former professional wrestler

== In popular culture ==
The 1982 film, Porky's, was based on incidents in the early 1960s at BCHS and writer-director Bob Clark's alma mater, Fort Lauderdale High School.
