= Jamar Newsome =

American football player (born 1987)

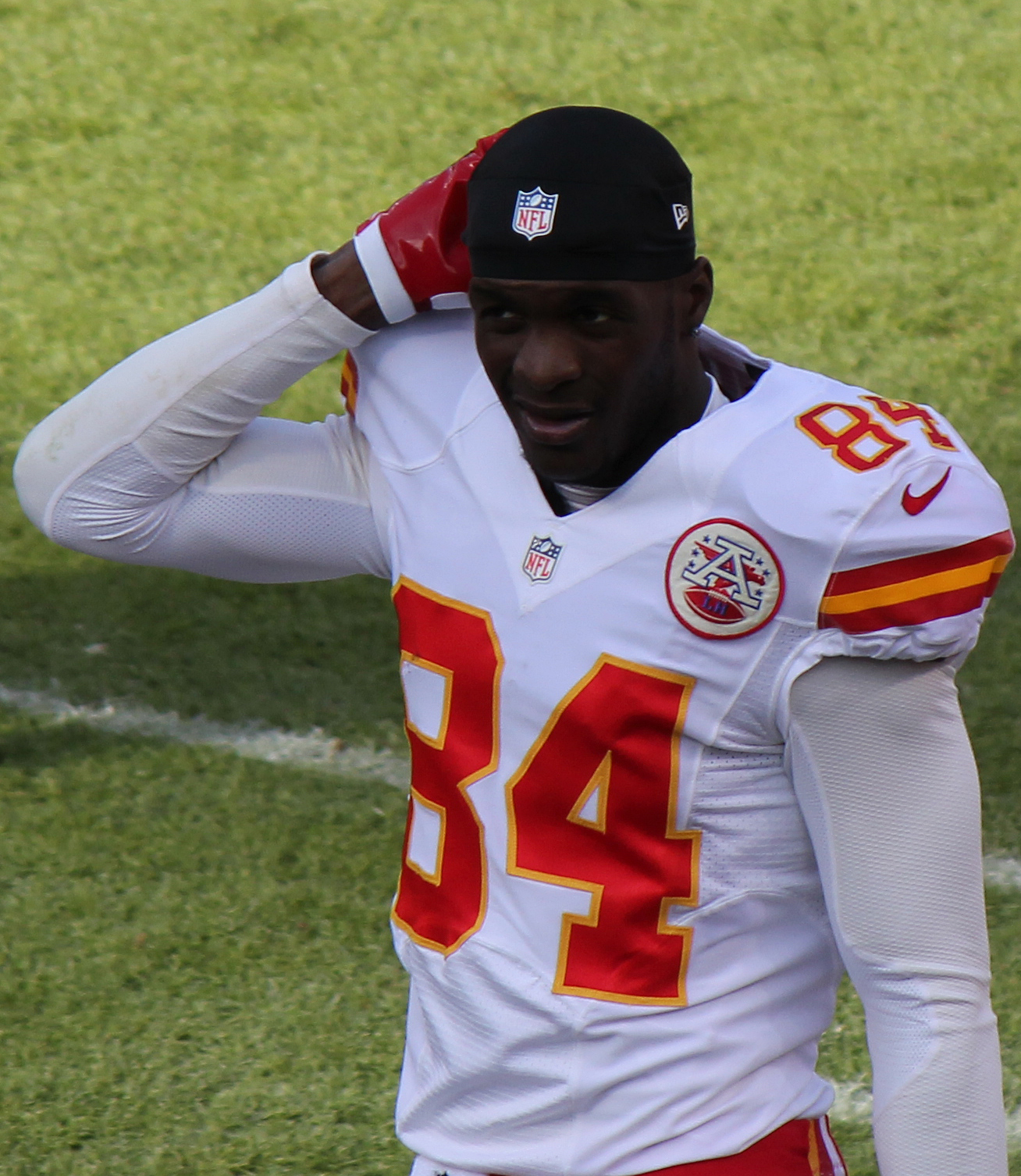
- Newsome in 2012.

No. 14, 84, 85
- Position: Wide receiver

Personal information
- Born: November 5, 1987 (age 39); St. Petersburg, Florida, U.S.
- Listed height: 6 ft 1 in (1.85 m)
- Listed weight: 206 lb (93 kg)

Career information
- High school: Boca Ciega (Gulfport, Florida)
- College: UCF
- NFL draft: 2011: undrafted

Career history
- Jacksonville Jaguars (2011); Pittsburgh Steelers (2011)*; Kansas City Chiefs (2011–2013); Dallas Cowboys (2013–2014)*
- * Offseason or practice squad member only

Career NFL statistics
- Receptions: 5
- Receiving yards: 73
- Receiving average: 14.6
- Stats at Pro Football Reference

Jamar Newsome (born November 5, 1987) is an American former professional football player who was a wide receiver in the National Football League (NFL). He was signed by the Jacksonville Jaguars as an undrafted free agent in 2011. He played college football for the UCF Knights. He has also played for the Pittsburgh Steelers, Kansas City Chiefs, and Dallas Cowboys.

== Professional career ==
=== Jacksonville Jaguars ===
After going undrafted in the 2011 NFL draft, Newsome was signed by the Jacksonville Jaguars. After starting the first two games of the season, Newsome was waived by the Jaguars. He was signed to the teams' practice squad the following day.

=== Pittsburgh Steelers ===
On November 2, 2011, Newsome was signed to the Pittsburgh Steelers' practice squad and was released by the team on December 1.

=== Kansas City Chiefs ===
On December 4, 2011, Newsome was signed to the Kansas City Chiefs' practice squad. On November 24, 2012, Newsome was signed to the Chiefs' active roster. Newsome played in six games and started two regular-season games for the Chiefs, catching five passes for 73 yards.

=== Dallas Cowboys ===
On September 17, 2013, Newsome was signed to the Dallas Cowboys' practice squad. The Cowboys released him during the 2014 preseason.

== Personal life ==
Jamar is a member of the Lambda Omega chapter of Kappa Alpha Psi at the University of Central Florida. Newsome graduated from UCF with a bachelor's degree in criminal justice. Also, Newsome maintains a master's degree in public administration with a specialization in criminal justice from Indiana Wesleyan University.

== Post NFL ==
=== United States Secret Service ===
As of October 2016, Newsome is a Special Agent with the United States Secret Service.
