= Killing of Sara-Nicole Morales =

2021 shooting in Florida, United States

- Sara-Nicole Morales
- Date: November 20, 2021
- Time: 5:19 p.m. (Eastern Standard Time)
- Location: Orange City, Florida, United States; 28.9588°N 81.2858°W
- Type: Shooting following road rage incident
- Deaths: 1
- Charges: None - shooting was found to be justifiable homicide

On November 20, 2021, 35‑year‑old Sara‑Nicole Morales was shot and killed in the front yard of her mother's house in Orange City, Florida, United States. While returning home from her job at a Volusia County library, she had become embroiled in a road rage incident with a local motorcyclist, during which she had intentionally struck his vehicle with hers, an act witnessed by two nearby motorists. The three notified police and followed her to the house, where she confronted them with her fiancé's pistol. The motorcyclist drew his own gun and shot her three times.

Morales, who was reported by her mother to be five months pregnant, was pronounced dead following arrival at a nearby hospital. The shooter, who had a concealed carry permit, was taken into police custody and released pending the investigation. Authorities were unable to confirm her pregnancy during the autopsy. Four months later the local prosecutor's office announced it had found the shooting justified as self-defense and would not be filing charges.

== Background ==
Sara-Nicole Morales (born April 7, 1986), had worked as a server in area restaurants until she got a job as a library assistant with the county in 2019, which she described as one of her dream jobs. At the time of her death she was engaged and reported by her mother to be pregnant; she had an 11-year-old daughter from a previous relationship.

== Incident ==
Around 5:10 p.m. on November 20, 2021, Morales was driving her blue Kia back from the DeLand Regional Library south on Volusia Avenue (U.S. routes 17 and 92) to her Orange City home. At one intersection another Orange City resident, a 40-year-old man who had gone out for a ride on his motorcycle, came up behind her when she stopped at a red light. Afterwards, he told police later, she attempted to cut him off.

The motorcyclist said he drove past her driver's side window and waved his hand to express his astonishment, then decided to hasten back to his home. As he sped away, Morales in turn overtook him, then swerved abruptly into his lane, striking his vehicle in the process. The collision caused visible damage to the saddlebags on the back of his motorcycle and nearly caused him to crash, but he was able to keep his cycle upright and was not injured. One witness claimed that as Morales drove away he saw the motorcyclist kick her car, though that was never confirmed by police.

Two other motorists, one also on a motorcycle, witnessed the collision. They likewise believed it had been intentional. They joined the first motorcyclist in confronting Morales the next time traffic stopped, at the light at Wisconsin Avenue in Orange City, and asking that she stop to exchange information and await the police, whom one had already notified. Instead, she turned towards her residence on East Wisconsin.

Orange City police were dispatched to the scene in response to the hit-and-run reported to them. Morales's mother, Doreen Flaherty, says her daughter had called from her car to complain that she was being followed by three men and to have her gun ready when Morales got home. Upon reaching Flaherty's house, Morales left the car, swearing loudly, and entered, where she called 9-1-1 to report the men following her, who arrived soon afterwards and remained in the street, at the foot of Flaherty's driveway, to await the police. Flaherty also took out her own gun, which she says was unloaded, and stepped outside the front door.

Before police arrived, Morales got her fiancé's handgun—which her mother says did not have a bullet chambered as Morales was not strong enough to pull back the slide—and went out to confront the men outside. She waved her hands and shouted "You're three men. You followed me. Leave me alone!" as she waved the gun around and pointed it at the man whose motorcycle she had hit. One of the accident witnesses recalled that he raised his hands and began shouting at everyone to calm down. Fearing Morales was about to shoot at him, the first motorcyclist drew the .45-caliber pistol he had a permit to carry concealed and fired eight times from 15 feet (5 m) away.

Five of those rounds struck Morales; dispatchers heard the shots in the background of their conversation with one of the witnesses to the original accident who was still on the phone. He described the shooting at the time as self-defense. Responding officers were informed that the incident was more serious as it involved a person with a gunshot wound. They arrived shortly afterwards and took the man, who begged them not to shoot him as he believed Morales was going to kill him with her gun, into custody.

Morales was still breathing, and was taken to Halifax Hospital where she was pronounced dead shortly after arrival due to the heavy blood loss. The man who shot her was described by police as cooperating with their investigation and they had not charged him pending a decision by the state's attorney's office, so he was released. Police found five of the ejected shell casings from his gun near where he had stood, and marks on Morales's Kia that appeared to correspond to the damage to the saddlebags on the man's motorcycle.

== Aftermath ==
In the days after the shooting, the Orange City police released audio of the 9-1-1 calls made from the scene and bodycam footage of the immediate aftermath. The 9-1-1 calls recorded the gunshots fired immediately after Morales had confronted the men.

Flaherty said that if her daughter had deliberately struck the motorcycle with her car, it would have only happened because she felt threatened. Similarly, her fiancé believed she would have only confronted the men for the same reason. "She is not the kind to give trouble or just go about pulling a gun on people ... She must have been really scared having her mother and her 11-year-old daughter at home." Later Flaherty said that she believed her daughter took out the gun meaning only to get the men to "back off" and would not have fired it even if it had been loaded.

While Flaherty allowed that "a gun means business ... I understand that", and told Inside Edition that her daughter should not have gone outside to begin with, she faulted the men for needlessly escalating the situation. "How bad was this accident that they needed to chase her down like they did?" she asked. "They had already given her license plate to 9-1-1, yet continued to chase her ... They came flying down this road. Who does that? Who does that?" The man who killed Morales refused to comment when contacted by a local newspaper; he had earlier told WOFL he felt he "had no choice" but to shoot at the time.

The county closed the two libraries where Morales had worked, in Pierson as well as DeLand, to give employees who had known her time to grieve, as well as counselors if they wanted. "We are all shaken up by the incident", said deputy county manager Suzanne Konchan. "As we grieve the loss of one of our own, we stand together in wholeheartedly supporting one another during this difficult time." A family friend established a GoFundMe page to support Morales's daughter; other library employees donated to it and bought Christmas gifts for the girl.

Neither Morales nor the man who shot her had any prior criminal arrest history. A check of their records found only traffic offenses. He had received a speeding ticket in 2019, and she had received three tickets in 2006: two moving violations and another for failing to display her registration.

The incident received national and international coverage. "As tragedies go", wrote The Economist, "it was an all-American story". The magazine used the story to discuss research from Everytown for Gun Safety showing that shootings related to road-rage incidents had doubled since 2016, particularly in states like Florida which have permissive concealed-carry laws; whereas such shootings remained rare in states with more restrictive laws.

== Disposition ==
Shortly after the shooting, a police spokesman said he did not expect that charges would be brought against the shooter. In early March 2022, the state's attorney's office for the 7th Circuit made that official. "[We have] completed a comprehensive review of this case. The Orange City Police Department concluded after a thorough investigation that the suspect would not be charged with a crime," they said in a news release. "While the facts in this case are truly heartbreaking, the law does not authorize filing of any criminal charges. Our sincerest thoughts and prayers go out to the Morales family."

== See also ==
Other cases in Florida where armed civilians asserted self-defense after fatal shootings:

- Killing of Trayvon Martin, 2012 incident where shooter was acquitted at trial
- Killing of Markeis McGlockton, 2018 case where shooter was convicted of manslaughter
