= John Reddihough =

British judge (born 1947)

John Hargreaves Reddihough (born 1947) is a British judge.

John Reddihough's early education was at Manchester Grammar School. He graduated from the University of Birmingham with an LLB degree in law in 1968. He was called to the Bar at Gray's Inn in 1969.

Reddihough was a recorder from 1994 to 2000. He was a circuit judge on the Midland & Oxford Circuit from 2000 to 2001 and on the North East Circuit from 2001 to 2009. He was the resident judge at Grimsby Combined Court Centre from 2001 to 2009. John Reddihough became a circuit judge on the South East Circuit in 2009.

John Reddihough was judge in the controversial case of Munir Hussain in 2009. An advocate of criminal rights, he jailed a victim of crime who fought back against a criminal who had just beaten up his son in front of him.
