= Wakulla Correctional Institution =

Prison in Florida, United States

Coordinates: 30°15′43″N 84°10′41″W

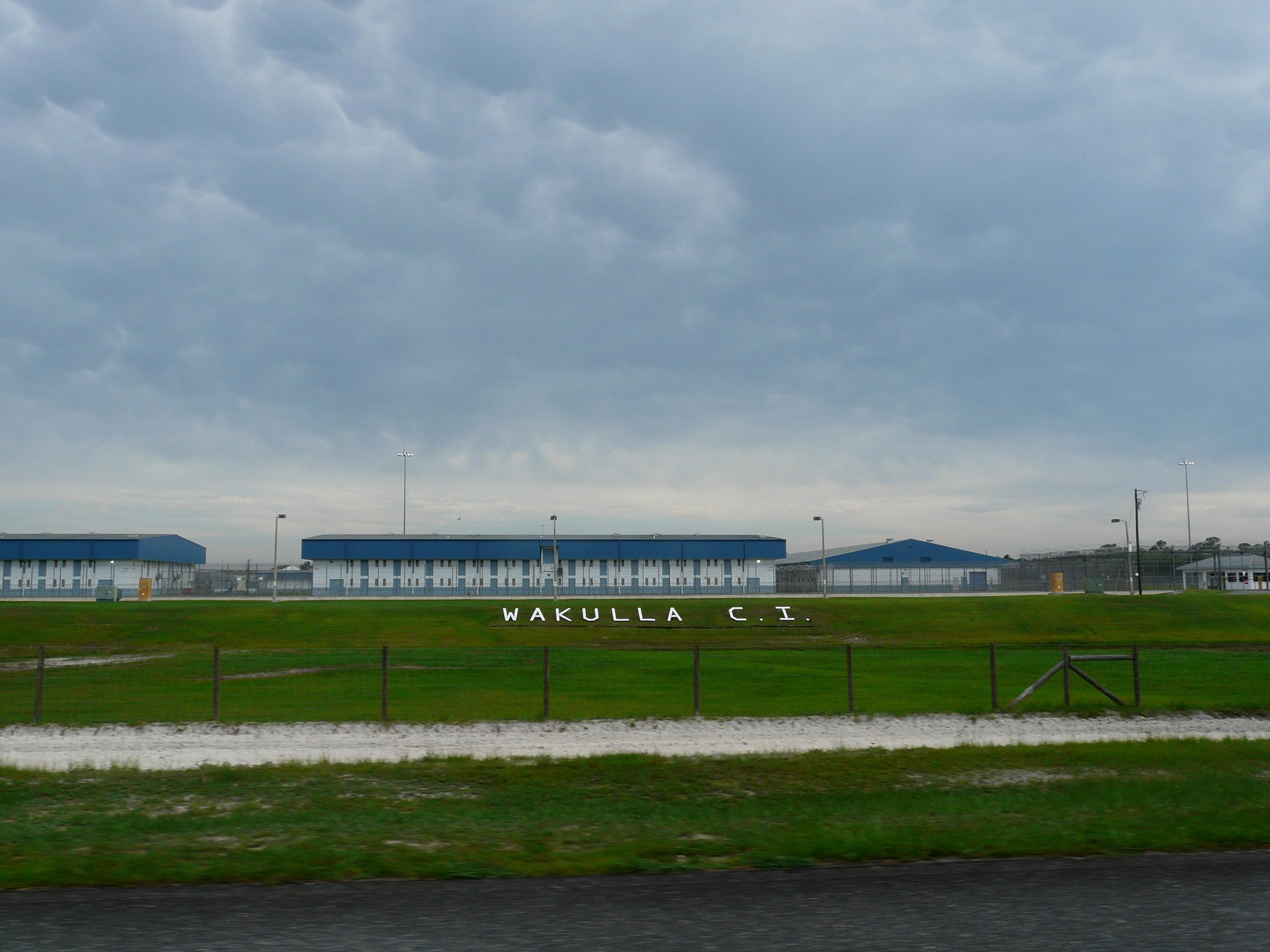
- Interactive map of Wakulla Correctional Institution
- Location: 110 Melaleuca Drive Crawfordville, Florida
- Status: mixed
- Capacity: 1397 + 1532 in Annex = 2929 total
- Opened: 1996
- Managed by: Florida Department of Corrections

Wakulla Correctional Institution is a prison located 20 miles (32 km) southeast of Tallahassee, Florida. It is located in Wakulla County, and served by the Crawfordville, Florida post office.

The attached Wakulla Correctional Institution Annex was established in 2008. It holds inmates of a higher level of classification and does not share the same faith and character-based mission as the main unit.

Wakulla Correctional Institution is the location of the Fallen Officer Memorial of the Florida Department of Corrections. The names of the fallen officers are engraved onto the memorial each year during an annual wreath laying ceremony with a portrait of the fallen placed on the wall inside of the adjacent building.

== Notable inmates ==
- Dedrick Williams - Convicted for the murder of XXXTentacion.
- Michael Drejka - Convicted for the killing of Markeis McGlockton.
- Nathaniel Brazill - Convicted to 28 years in prison for fatally shooting one of his schoolteachers, Barry Grunow, at Lake Worth Middle School, on May 26, 2000.
