= Munir Hussain case =

British businessman and community leader

Munir Hussain is a British businessman and community leader who was sentenced to 30 months imprisonment following an attack on an intruder who had broken into his home and threatened him and his family.

== Confrontation with intruders ==
On 3 September 2008, during Ramadan, Munir Hussain (then 53), his wife, and three children then between 15 and 21, returned home to their house in High Wycombe, Buckinghamshire, England, from their mosque, when they were confronted and tied up by three masked intruders.

Their younger son Samad (15) broke free, fleeing upstairs pursued by two of the masked men, and managed to raise the alarm. Meanwhile, Munir turned on the remaining intruder, Walid Salem. Munir chased him off the premises and was joined by his brother Tokeer Hussain, who lived a few doors away.

Munir and Tokeer brought Salem to the ground in a neighbour's front garden. Salem was then subjected to a ferocious attack which left him with a brain injury and a fractured skull. Witnesses said about four Asian men were seen battering Salem with implements including a hockey stick and cricket bat. One witness pleaded with the attackers to stop, telling them that they were going to kill the man on the ground, but she was disregarded.

== Case ==
At Reading Crown Court on 14 December 2009, Judge John Reddihough sentenced Munir Hussain to 30 months in prison whilst sentencing Tokeer to 39 months in prison (full transcript of judgement.). Tokeer was given a harsher sentence because the judge said he had not faced as much provocation as his brother.

Judge Reddihough:The prosecution rightly made it plain that there was no allegation against you, Munir Hussain, in respect of the force you used against Salem in defending your own home and family or of the force used by either of you in apprehending Salem. However, the attack which then occurred was totally unnecessary and amounted to a very violent revenge attack on a defenceless man. It may be that some members of the public or media commentators will assert that Salem deserved what happened to him, and that you should not have been prosecuted and need not be punished. The courts must make it clear that such conduct is criminal and unacceptable ... If persons were permitted to take the law into their own hands and inflict their own instant and violent punishment on an apprehended offender rather than letting the criminal justice system take its course, then the rule of law and our system of criminal justice, which are hallmarks of a civilised society, would collapse.

On 20 January 2010 the Court of Appeal reduced Munir's sentence to one year, suspended for two years, which meant he was immediately freed. Tokeer's sentence was reduced to two years, but not suspended, which meant he remained in prison. This ruling was criticised by some lawyers as paying too much attention to media attention and public outcry, and they claimed that the law worked well as it stood. Others, including Chris Grayling, the Conservative shadow Home Secretary, considered that the law should be changed.

It was later claimed that the motive for the break-in was not burglary, but that a man who (wrongly) believed his wife had had an affair with Munir Hussain had hired the three intruders to carry out an 'honour' attack. The wife stated there was no affair and that her only relationship with Munir was a business one, but her husband had become jealous because she had been happy at work. The wife is under police protection. The reports came as a surprise to the Hussains who believed the motive was robbery. However, during the Hussains' first trial, John Price QC, prosecuting, noted:

John Price QC:Whatever the motivation for the attack, it was something of a personal kind. ... It didn't seem it had been done out of a desire to steal anything, rather that it was directed at the people who lived there.

On 29 March 2010 at Reading Crown Court, Wahleed Hussain, Munir's nephew, was freed after the jury were unable to reach a verdict over a charge of grievous bodily harm with intent relating to the attack on Salem. After the trial had ended (the last involving members of the Hussain family) Munir Hussain spoke out against his treatment:

Munir Hussain:The justice system has failed us and it has failed the country, as we should never have been charged.

== Contentious issues ==
The contentious issue is the reasonableness of the force used, related to the delay between Munir Hussain's breaking free and the attack on Walid Salem, and the degree of force used. Judge Reddihough made this clear in his original judgement, and the then director of public prosecutions, later leader of the Labour Party and Prime Minister, Keir Starmer QC, said after the conviction of Munir.

Keir Starmer QC:There are many cases, some involving death, where no prosecutions are brought ... We would only ever bring a prosecution where we thought that the degree of force was unreasonable in such a way that the jury would realistically convict. So these are very rare cases and history tells us that the current test works very well.

The appeal succeeded (partially) because

Paul Mendelle QC:The court of appeal relied upon his [Munir's] impeccable character and the fact it was a provoked unplanned attack, and the very strong psychiatric evidence in this case.

== Intruders ==
In September 2009, Walid Salem, then 57, was given a two-year non-custodial supervision order to the charge of false imprisonment of the Hussain family, as he was considered unfit to plead due to brain damage caused by the attack by Munir and Tokeer Hussain.

== Other cases ==
Other notable cases involving the use of force by victims:

- Tony Martin (farmer)
- Death of John Ward
- Fred Hemstock
- Omari Roberts
