= Criminal Law (Sexual Offences) Act 2006 =

The Criminal Law (Sexual Offences) Act 2006 is an Act of the Oireachtas (Irish parliament) which was passed in response to the Supreme Court decision in CC v. Ireland [2006] IESC 33 which struck down as unconstitutional a seventy-year-old provision on statutory rape. The Act provides for a defence of honest mistake where, if a defendant can satisfy the court that he or she honestly believed that the person with whom the sexual activity was committed, was of consenting age at the time (which the Act now sets as seventeen years old for both sexes). The lack of such a defence in section 1(1) of the Criminal Law Amendment Act 1935 caused the Supreme Court to declare that section void.

The Act also provides for the first time that a woman could commit statutory rape, and merged the previously separate offences which related to heterosexual and homosexual statutory rape into two offences which cover both. However, as an exception to the otherwise gender neutral provisions of the Act, girls under the age of seventeen cannot be found guilty of an offence under the Act.

== See also ==
- Criminal Law Act
