= Statutory rape =

Sexual activity with a person under the age of consent

In some jurisdictions, statutory rape is sexual activity in which one of the individuals is below the age of consent, the age required to legally consent to the activity. Although the term statutory rape usually refers to adults engaging in sexual contact with minors under the age of consent, it is a generic term, and very few jurisdictions use it in the language of statutes. In statutory rape, overt force or threat is usually not present. Statutory rape laws presume coercion because a minor or mentally disabled adult is legally incapable of giving consent to the act.

== Age of consent ==
In many jurisdictions, the age of consent is interpreted to mean mental or functional age. As a result, victims can be of any chronological age if their mental age makes them unable to consent to a sexual act.

== Specific laws depending on countries ==
=== Denmark ===
The law reads in Danish:

§ 222. Den, som har samleje med et barn under 15 år, straffes med fængsel indtil 8 år, medmindre forholdet er omfattet af § 216, stk. 2. Ved fastsættelse af straffen skal det indgå som en skærpende omstændighed, at gerningsmanden har skaffet sig samlejet ved udnyttelse af sin fysiske eller psykiske overlegenhed.

Stk. 2. Har gerningsmanden skaffet sig samlejet ved tvang eller fremsættelse af trusler, kan straffen stige til fængsel indtil 12 år.

Which translates roughly to:

§ 222. One who has sexual intercourse with a child under the age of 15, shall be punished by imprisonment for up to 8 years, unless the situation is covered by § 216 paragraph 2. In determining the penalty, it shall be an aggravating circumstance if the perpetrator has gained intercourse by exploiting their physical or mental superiority.

Paragraph. 2. If the offender has gained intercourse by coercion or threats, the penalty may be increased to imprisonment for up to 12 years.

The content of § 216 paragraph 2 specifies the penalty can be increased to 12 years, if the child is under the age of 12.

=== Ireland ===
In May 2006, the Irish Supreme Court found the existing statutory rape laws to have been unconstitutional, since they prevented the defendant from entering a defence (e.g., that he had reasonably believed that the other party was over the age of consent). This has led to the release of people held under the statutory rape law and has led to public demands that the law be changed by emergency legislation being enacted. On 2 June, 2006, the Irish Supreme Court upheld an appeal by the state against the release of one such person, "Mr A". Mr A was rearrested shortly afterwards to continue serving his sentence.

=== Italy ===
In Italy the age of consent is 14. A Romeo and Juliet rule applies for an age difference of one year. However, if the older person has a position of authority over the younger, such as a relative, teacher, parish priest, or doctor, the age of consent is 16.

=== The Netherlands ===
- Article 244
  A person who, with a person younger than 12 years, performs indecent acts comprising or including sexual penetration of the body, will be punished with imprisonment up to twelve years or a fine up to that of the fifth category.
- Article 245
  A person who, out of wedlock, with a person who has reached the age of 12 but has not reached 16 years, performs indecent acts comprising or including sexual penetration of the body is liable to a term of imprisonment up to eight years or a fine up to that of the fifth category.

Note on marriage;

- Article 245, dealing with sex with persons between 12 and 16 years, only applies outside of marriage, however a marriage with someone under 16 requires authorisation from the minister of justice, which can only be obtained if there are "compelling reasons" for such a marriage.

Notes on the Dutch law;

- Sexual penetration is not only sexual intercourse. The object does not even necessarily have to be a penis or another body part. Giving cunnilingus, receiving fellatio and active French kissing can be considered rape as well.
- A fine is seldom given to a case of severe crimes, such as statutory rape. In nearly all cases the committer is condemned to prison.
- Fines are divided into categories. The higher number the category is, the higher is the fine. The maximum fine of the fifth category is €83,000.
- "Consent" of the minor and the use or absence of violence is not a criterion. If the other is minor, it is statutory rape. The maximum punishment depends on whether the victim is younger than 12 years (then it is up to 12 years' imprisonment) or older than 12 years (the imprisonment will be up to 8 years).

=== United Kingdom ===
For England and Wales, the legal framework of the Sexual Offences Act 2003 differentiates between sexual contact with children under 13, and sexual contact with those at least 13 but under 16.

Sexual penetration of a child under 13 is termed rape of a child under 13, an offence created by section 5 of the act, which reads:

(1) Rape of a child under 13

A person commits an offence if—

(a) he intentionally penetrates the vagina, anus or mouth of another person with his penis, and

(b) the other person is under 13.

The explanatory notes read: "Whether or not the child consented to this act is irrelevant". The term rape is used with regard to children under 13; consensual sexual penetration of a child above 13 but under 16 is defined as sexual activity with a child, and punished less severely (section 9, which requires the perpetrator to be 18 or over). A minor can also be guilty of sexual contact with another minor (section 13), but the explanatory notes state that decisions whether to prosecute in cases where both parties are minors are to be taken on a case-by-case basis. The Crown prosecution guidelines state "[I]t is not in the public interest to prosecute children who are of the same or similar age and understanding that engage in sexual activity, where the activity is truly consensual for both parties and there are no aggravating features, such as coercion or corruption."

Northern Ireland follows a similar legal framework, under the Sexual Offences (Northern Ireland) Order 2008. This act overhauled the sexual offences laws in Northern Ireland, and fixed the age of consent at 16 in line with the rest of the UK; prior to this act it was 17.

In Scotland, the Sexual Offences (Scotland) Act 2009 also fixes an age of consent of 16, and is also two-tiered, treating children under 13 differently than children 13–15. Section 18, rape of a young child, applies to children under 13. Before the enactment of this act, Scotland had very few statutory sexual offences, with most of its sexual legislation being defined at common law, which was increasingly seen as a problem in particular for the issue of consent. The creation of a two-tier age limit was deemed very important during the drafting of the act.

=== United States ===
==== Terminology ====
Statutory rape generally refers to sexual activity that is unlawful because a participant is below the legally prescribed age of consent, without requiring proof of force or lack of consent. The statutory terms used to formally define the offense vary significantly by jurisdiction. Statutes may define the offense as sexual assault, rape of a child, corruption of a minor, unlawful sex with a minor, carnal knowledge of a minor, sexual battery,, carnal knowledge, child sexual abuse or child molestation may also be used. Sexual contact with a younger child may be treated as a more serious crime, whether under the same or separate statutes.

==== Rationale of statutory rape laws in the United States ====
Statutory rape laws are based on the premise that an individual is legally incapable of consenting to sexual intercourse until that person reaches a certain age. The law mandates that even if the individual willingly engages in sexual intercourse, the sex is not consensual.

Another rationale comes from the fact that minors are generally economically, socially, and legally unequal to adults. By making it illegal for an adult to have sex with a minor, statutory rape laws aim to give the minor some protection against adults in a position of power over the youth.

Another argument presented in defence of statutory rape laws relates to the difficulty in prosecuting rape (against a victim of any age) in the courtroom. Because forced sexual intercourse with a minor is considered a particularly heinous form of rape, these laws relieve the prosecution of the burden to prove lack of consent. This makes conviction more frequent in cases involving minors.

The original purpose of statutory rape laws was to protect young, unwed females from males who might impregnate them and not take responsibility by providing support for the child. In the past, the solution to such problems was often a shotgun wedding, a forced marriage called for by the parents of the girl in question. This rationale aims to preserve the marriageability of the girl and to prevent unwanted teenage pregnancy.

Historically, a man could defend himself against statutory rape charges by proving that his victim was already sexually experienced prior to their encounter (and thus not subject to being corrupted by the defendant). A requirement that the victim be "of previously chaste character" remained in effect in some U.S. states until as late as the 1990s.

==== Consensual teenage sex ====
Consensual teenage sex is common in the United States. A 1995 study revealed that 50% of U.S. teenagers have had sexual intercourse by the age of sixteen. It is estimated that there are more than 7 million incidents of statutory rape every year. However, it is clear that most incidents are not prosecuted and do not lead to arrests and convictions. Laws vary in their definitions of statutory rape.

==== Female-on-male statutory rape ====
Until the late 1970s, sex involving an adult female and an underage male was often ignored by the law, due to the belief that it often constitutes sexual initiation of the younger male. In 2005, the Office of Juvenile Justice and Delinquency Prevention estimated that 5% of statutory rape victims were male, and that 94% of the perpetrators in these cases were female; 73% of the female perpetrators were aged 21 or over, while 76% of the male victims were aged 15 or younger.

A 2006 review of scientific research found that the majority of men who had sex with women as underaged boys hold a positive reaction about the relationship, with a third of them being neutral and less than 5% being negative toward it. However, these men expressed slightly higher levels of psychological distress than men who had not had these experiences. The authors suggested that societal views may disincline men from recognising negative or abusive elements of the relationships. In contrast, women who were involved with adult men when they were underage mostly had negative reactions once they left the relationship, seeing them as sexual deviants who could not find willing same-age partners and who instead exploited young girls.

U.S. courts have held that male victims of statutory rape are liable for child support for any children resulting from the crime, uniformly taking the view that the criminal act of the mother is irrelevant to a child support obligation. One case which established this principle was *Hermesmann v. Seyer, in Kansas in 1993. In many cases, the males were not characterised as victims, but as willing participants. Courts often rely on the consent of the victim to the sexual intercourse when imposing child support orders, even though within the context of statutory rape prosecutions minors are deemed legally incapable of giving consent. County of San Luis Obispo v. Nathaniel J. examined the case of a 15-year-old male victim and a 34-year-old female perpetrator where the sexual assault resulted in the birth of a child. When questioned, the male victim stated that the sex was "a mutually agreeable act". The 34-year-old perpetrator was prosecuted and convicted of unlawful sex with a minor. However, the lawsuit in question demanded child support from the male victim for the child who was born. The court found that the boy was "not an innocent victim", and had responsibilities to the child despite the fact that he had been the victim of a sexual assault and had not been of the age of consent. The court ruled that the victim would be responsible for child support once he reached the age of majority.

==== Same-sex statutory rape ====
In some jurisdictions, relationships between adults and minors are penalised more when both are the same sex. For example, in the US state of Kansas, if someone 18 or older has sex with a minor no more than four years younger, a Romeo and Juliet law limits the penalty substantially. As written, however, this law did not apply to same-sex couples, leaving them subject to higher penalties than opposite-sex couples for the same offence. This resulted in higher statutory rape convictions, larger fines, and sex offender registration for teens involved in same-sex statutory rape. The Kansas law was successfully challenged as being in conflict with the U.S. Supreme Court rulings Lawrence v. Texas and Romer v. Evans. The Lawrence precedent did not directly address equal protection, but its application in the case of State v. Limon (2005) invalidated age of consent laws that discriminate based on sexual orientation in Kansas.

== Romeo and Juliet laws ==
Teenagers often engage in sexual conduct as part of an intimate relationship. This may occur before either participant has reached the age of consent, or after one has but the other has not. In the latter case, in most jurisdictions, the person who has reached the age of consent is guilty of statutory rape. In some jurisdictions, if two minors have sex with each other, they are both guilty of engaging in unlawful sex with the other person. The act itself is prima facie evidence of guilt when one participant is incapable of legally consenting.

Many jurisdictions have passed so-called "Romeo and Juliet laws" which serve to reduce or eliminate the penalty of the crime in cases where the couple's age difference is minor and the sexual contact would not have been rape if both partners were legally able to give consent. Such laws vary, but can include:

- Rephrasing the definition of the offence itself to completely exclude situations where the difference in age is less than a specific time period.
- Providing an affirmative defence to statutory rape based on the small difference in the participants' ages, or on evidence of a pre-existing sexual relationship between the accused and the perceived victim that did not constitute statutory rape (e.g. both parties were underage when the relationship started).
- Reducing the severity of the offence from a felony to a misdemeanor, which prevents loss of civil rights and reduces available penalties.
- Reducing the penalty in such cases to a fine, probation or community service.
- Eliminating the requirement that the convicted participant register as a sex offender, or reducing the duration of such registration from life to one, five or ten years.
- Allowing a convicted party to petition for expungement after serving any adjudged sentence.

Such laws generally apply to a couple whose ages differ by less than a specified number of years. They are, however, generally unavailable in any case where the older participant has an authoritative position over the younger regardless of relative age, such as a teacher/student, coach/player or guardian/ward relationship, or if any physical force was used or serious physical injury resulted. This is normally accomplished by making acts involving these circumstances separate crimes to which the "Romeo and Juliet" defence does not apply.

An example is Texas Penal Code, Section 22.011(e). It provides an affirmative defence to a charge of sexual assault if all of the following apply;

- The accused was not more than 3 years older than the perceived victim
- The perceived victim was older than 14 years of age at the time of the offence (age of consent in Texas is 17 years)
- The accused was not at the time registered or required to register for life as a sex offender
- The conduct did not constitute incest
- Neither the accused nor perceived victim would commit bigamy by marrying the other (in other words, neither was married to a third person)

A similar affirmative defence exists in the Texas Penal Code for the related crime of "continuous sexual abuse of a young child or children". Any defence under either law, however, does not apply to the separate crime of "improper educator/student relationship" (sexual relations between a licensed teacher or school employee and a student of the same school), or for "aggravated sexual assault" (the forcible rape statute of Texas law).

Some countries other than the United States also have Romeo and Juliet laws. Ireland’s 2006 law has been contested because it treats girls differently from boys. In Canada, the age of consent is normally 16, but there are two close-in-age exemptions: sex with minors aged 14–15 is permitted if the partner is less than five years older, and sex with minors aged 12–13 is permitted if the partner is less than two years older. Other countries state that the sexual conduct with the minor is not to be punished if the partners are of a similar age and development: for instance, the age of consent in Finland is 16, but the law states that the act will not be punished if "there is no great difference in the ages or the mental and physical maturity of the persons involved". Another approach takes the form of a stipulation that sexual intercourse between a minor and an adult is legal under the condition that the latter does not exceed a certain age. In Slovenia, the age of consent is 15, but the activity is only deemed criminal if there is "a marked discrepancy between the maturity of the perpetrator and that of the victim".

== See also ==
- Age-of-consent reform
- Jailbait
- Pitcairn sexual assault trial of 2004
- Rape by gender
- Types of rape
