= Josh Bellamy =

American football player (born 1989)

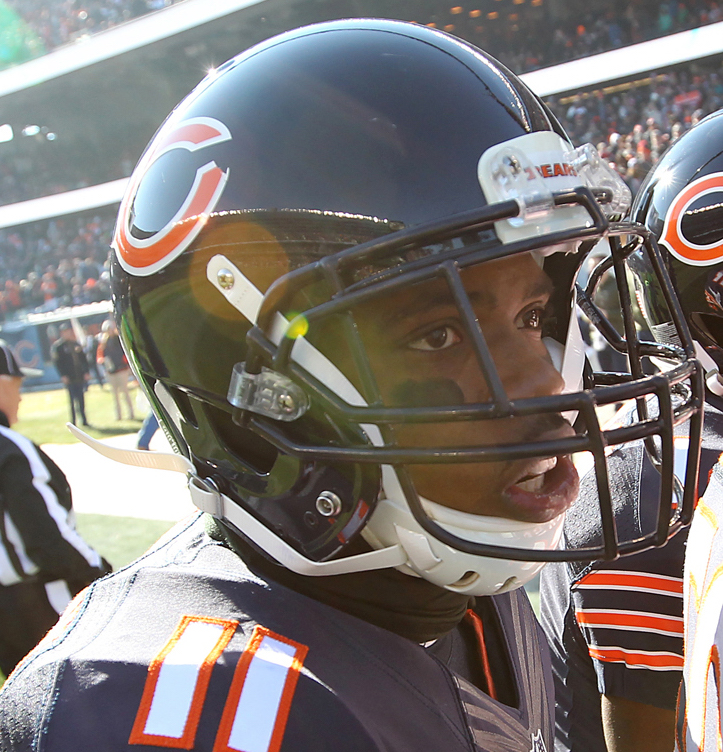
- Bellamy with the Chicago Bears in 2015

No. 11, 17, 15
- Position: Wide receiver

Personal information
- Born: May 18, 1989 (age 37); St. Petersburg, Florida, U.S.
- Listed height: 6 ft 0 in (1.83 m)
- Listed weight: 208 lb (94 kg)

Career information
- High school: Boca Ciega (Gulfport, Florida)
- College: Louisville
- NFL draft: 2012: undrafted

Career history
- Kansas City Chiefs (2012); San Diego Chargers (2013)*; Washington Redskins (2013); Chicago Bears (2014–2018); New York Jets (2019)
- * Offseason or practice squad member only

Career NFL statistics
- Receptions: 78
- Receiving yards: 1,019
- Receiving touchdowns: 5
- Return yards: 128
- Stats at Pro Football Reference

Joshua Joevan Bellamy (born May 18, 1989) is an American former professional football player who was a wide receiver in the National Football League (NFL). He played college football at Butte Community College before transferring to Louisville, and signed with the Kansas City Chiefs of the National Football League (NFL) as an undrafted free agent in 2012. He also played for the Washington Redskins, Chicago Bears, and New York Jets.

== Early life ==
Bellamy attended and played high school football at Boca Ciega High School.

== College career ==
Bellamy played college football for the Louisville Cardinals under head coach Charlie Strong. He finished his senior season with 24 receptions, 280 receiving yards, and two receiving touchdowns. Before transferring to Louisville, he played for Butte Community College in Oroville, California, and led them to an undefeated JUCO national championship.

=== College statistics ===
Year	School	Conf	Class	Pos	G	Rec	Yds	Avg	TD
2010	Louisville	Big East	JR	WR	13	29	401	13.8	5
2011	Louisville	Big East	SR	WR	13	24	280	11.7	2
Career	Louisville					53	681	12.8	7

== Professional career ==
=== Kansas City Chiefs ===
On April 30, 2012, Bellamy signed with the Kansas City Chiefs as an undrafted free agent. On August 31, 2012, he was released from the roster. On September 1, 2012, he was signed to the practice squad. On December 8, 2012, he was promoted to the active roster.

He was released by the team on August 31, 2013.

=== San Diego Chargers ===
On September 10, 2013, Bellamy was signed by the San Diego Chargers to their practice squad. On November 19, 2013, he was released by the Chargers.

=== Washington Redskins ===
On November 21, 2013, two days after his release from the Chargers, Bellamy was signed by the Washington Redskins to their practice squad. On November 26, 2013, Bellamy was promoted to the 53-man roster. He was released by the team on April 5, 2014.

=== Chicago Bears ===
Bellamy was acquired off waivers by the Chicago Bears on April 8, 2014. The Bears signed him to the team's practice squad on September 1, 2014, after waiving him earlier for final roster cuts. He was activated on September 13, 2014.

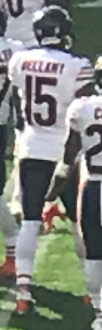
Bellamy with the Bears in 2018

On September 20, 2015, Bellamy caught his first career touchdown against the Arizona Cardinals. On October 11, 2015, Bellamy caught a career-high 6 receptions against the Kansas City Chiefs. On November 22, 2015, Bellamy caught 4 passes for a then career-high 57 yards against the Denver Broncos. On December 6, 2015, Bellamy had his first start, against the San Francisco 49ers, catching a pass for 16 yards.

On April 18, 2016, Bellamy signed his exclusive rights tender offer. He re-signed with Chicago on a one-year deal worth $760,000. On November 27, 2016, Bellamy caught four passes for 41 yards against the Tennessee Titans, but struggled with drops as the Bears lost 27–21. On December 4, 2016, Bellamy caught four passes for a career-high 93 yards against the San Francisco 49ers.

On March 6, 2017, Bellamy re-signed with the Bears. He caught a 46-yard touchdown against the Green Bay Packers on November 12, his second-longest touchdown of his career. On December 16, Bellamy caught five passes for a season-high 70 yards against the Detroit Lions. He played 15 games with seven starts, finishing with a career-high 24 receptions for 376 yards, good for second on the team behind Kendall Wright.

He re-signed with the Chicago Bears for the 2018 season on a one-year contract worth $1,906,000. On September 30, 2018, Bellamy caught his first touchdown of the season in the 48–10 victory over the Tampa Bay Buccaneers. On December 15, Bellamy was fined $10,026 for a chop-block on Los Angeles Rams lineman Aaron Donald.

In Week 16 against the San Francisco 49ers, Bellamy was ejected after fighting cornerback Richard Sherman. They started fighting after 49ers safety Marcell Harris made a late hit on quarterback Mitchell Trubisky and wide receiver Anthony Miller joined the effort. In addition, Sherman and Miller were also ejected from the game. Before Bellamy was ejected, he had just one reception for 6 receiving yards. The Bears would go on to win 14–9.

Bellamy ended the year with 14 receptions for 117 yards and a touchdown. In the Bears' Wild Card Round playoff defeat to the Philadelphia Eagles, he recorded a 34-yard catch that set up the Bears' lone offensive touchdown of the game.

=== New York Jets ===
On March 15, 2019, Bellamy signed a two-year, $5 million contract with the New York Jets. He was placed on injured reserve on November 5 due to a shoulder injuries; he had two catches for 20 yards on the season.

Bellamy was placed on the reserve/physically unable to perform list on May 5, 2020, ending his 2020 season. He was released on September 8, 2020.

== Fraud charges ==
On September 10, 2020, Bellamy was arrested and charged for his alleged participation in a scheme to file fraudulent loan applications worth over $24 million via the Paycheck Protection Program. He was convicted and sentenced to 37 months in federal prison on December 10, 2021. He is among the most well-known people convicted of loan fraud.
