= Killing of Markeis McGlockton =

2018 manslaughter in Clearwater, Florida

- Map of Clearwater, Florida
- Location: 27.98981°N 82.78758°W; Circle A Food Store in Clearwater, Florida, U.S.
- Date: July 19, 2018; 3:30 p.m. EDT (McGlockton shot); 4:04 p.m. EDT (McGlockton declared dead)
- Attack type: Shooting, manslaughter
- Injuries: Drejka (bruise)
- Victim: Markeis Deon McGlockton
- Perpetrator: Michael Andrew Drejka
- Motive: Parking space dispute
- Verdict: Guilty
- Convictions: Manslaughter
- Sentence: 20 years in prison

On July 19, 2018, Markeis McGlockton, 28, was fatally shot by Michael Drejka in a parking lot outside a convenience store in Clearwater, Florida. After McGlockton entered the store, Drejka approached McGlockton's car to confront the driver, McGlockton's girlfriend, for parking in a disabled parking space without a placard. McGlockton, alerted to the argument, exited the store and shoved Drejka to the ground. Drejka immediately drew his handgun, and fired once while McGlockton was backing away. McGlockton later died from his injuries at a local hospital.

Drejka, a 47-year-old man, was not initially charged for the killing by the Pinellas County Sheriff's Office, with Sheriff Bob Gualtieri citing Florida's stand-your-ground law as the reason. The investigation was then handed over to the Sixth Judicial Circuit Court of Florida State Attorney Bernie McCabe, who charged Drejka with one count of manslaughter on August 13, 2018. Drejka pleaded not guilty to the charge. His trial began on August 19, 2019. Drejka was convicted of manslaughter on August 23, 2019, and was sentenced to imprisonment for twenty years on October 10, 2019. The incident was widely reported by news media as another instance of Florida's stand-your-ground law, and generated significant attention and protests because Drejka was white and McGlockton was black with similarities to the killing of Trayvon Martin six years prior which generated international attention and debate.

== Parties involved ==
=== Markeis McGlockton ===
Markeis Deon McGlockton (March 28, 1990 – July 19, 2018) grew up in Clearwater, Florida, and formerly lived in St. Petersburg. Within Pinellas County Schools, McGlockton attended middle school in St. Petersburg; and attended Boca Ciega High School but later dropped out.

In 2009, McGlockton met Britany Jacobs through a friend while she was a student at Dunedin High School. The couple had three children together during his lifetime. Jacobs publicly revealed her pregnancy with their fourth child in December 2018.

McGlockton used to work at Burger King. He later worked nights as a clerk at a 7-Eleven until his death. While Jacobs worked in the daytime as a certified nursing assistant, McGlockton was a stay-at-home dad for their children.

Michael Andrew Drejka
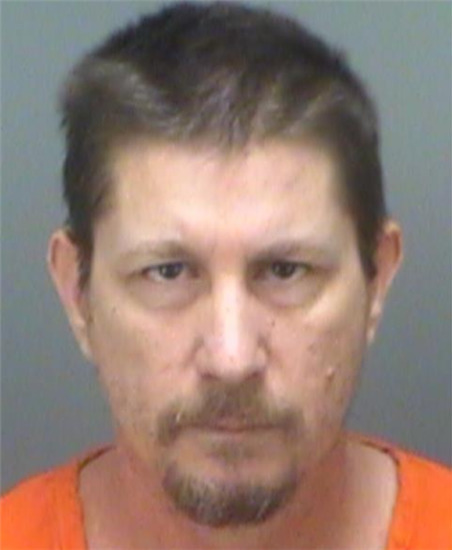
- Born: August 5, 1970 (age 56); Delaware, U.S.
- Status: Incarcerated
- Conviction: Manslaughter
- Penalty: 20 years imprisonment

Details
- Victims: Markeis McGlockton, 28
- Date: July 19, 2018
- Country: United States
- State: Florida
- Weapon: Pistol
- Imprisoned at: Wakulla Correctional Institution Annex

=== Michael Drejka ===
Michael Andrew Drejka (born August 5, 1970) originally lived in Delaware. His father was a Delaware State Trooper. He had a concealed carry license. Drejka worked for Asplundh Tree Expert Company as a tree-trimmer and often performed cleanup work. He quit the tree-trimming business in 2007 and lived with his girlfriend Cara Lynne Brooks. In 2010, Drejka moved to Pinellas County, where he got married. He reported himself as retired.

== Shooting ==
On the afternoon of July 19, 2018, McGlockton, along with the McGlockton's three children, picked up Jacobs from her employer in a 2016 Chrysler 200. Jacobs took the wheel and drove the family to the Circle A Food Mart so McGlockton could buy snacks for the children. Jacobs illegally parked the vehicle in a handicapped parking space located on the side of the building while McGlockton went into the store with their five-year-old son, Markeis Jr.

While Jacobs was sitting inside the vehicle with the McGlockton's other two children (aged three years and four months), Drejka pulled up in his Toyota 4-Runner, also parking illegally. Drejka got out of his SUV and searched for a disabled parking placard on Jacobs' vehicle. Not finding one, video surveillance shows Drejka starting a confrontation with Jacobs. McGlockton was checking out when he was told by another customer what was happening outside.

Around 3:30 pm, McGlockton strode out of the store, shoved Drejka to the ground, and kept walking towards him. Three seconds later, Drejka, while sitting, pulled out a .40-caliber Glock, which he steadied with both hands. McGlockton immediately backed up when confronted with the firearm. As McGlockton backed up to his vehicle he began to turn towards the front of the store and away from Drejka. Drejka then fired a single shot striking McGlockton in the left side of his chest almost under his armpit. After being shot, McGlockton ran back into the store and collapsed in front of his son. Paramedics arrived 19 minutes later and rushed McGlockton to Morton Plant Hospital, where he was pronounced dead at 4:04 pm.

=== Location ===
The shooting occurred at Circle A Food Store located on Sunset Point Road in Clearwater. The convenience store has been locally owned by Abdalla "Ali" Salous for twenty years. He was not present in the store at the time of the shooting. Salous previously had issues with Drejka at his business. Both Drejka and McGlockton were regular customers at the store. Salous said that Drejka came to his store daily to buy Monster drinks. A month after the shooting, Salous said the incident hurt the business, but added the public should not be afraid simply because of the assailant's actions. After Drejka was released from jail on bond, Salous stated that Drejka was banned from the property. Drejka was represented by criminal defense attorneys John Trevena and Bryant Camareno.

== Investigations ==
=== Pinellas County Sheriff's Office ===
The incident took place in an unincorporated area of Clearwater, falling outside the local police department's jurisdiction; thus the investigation was conducted by the Pinellas County Sheriff's Office, rather than the Clearwater Police Department.

==== Drejka questioned and released ====
Following the shooting, Drejka reportedly put the gun in his SUV as he waited for law enforcement to arrive. Drejka cooperated with deputies on the scene, and was transported to the North District Station in nearby Dunedin, Florida, for further questioning by detectives. Deputies took possession of his gun.

While being questioned by detectives, Drejka stated that he was in fear of physical harm and had acted in self-defense when he shot McGlockton. He claimed that they did not exchange words with each other and that he thought McGlockton had stepped toward him before he fired his gun. Drejka said he would not have shot at McGlockton if he had stayed still or retreated. Drejka was asked to re-enact the incident, with a detective filling in for McGlockton.

Drejka told detectives that he had carried a gun since the age of 22. He revealed that the gun he used to shoot McGlockton formerly belonged to a Delaware police officer. The interview lasted six hours.

==== Gualtieri cites stand-your-ground ====
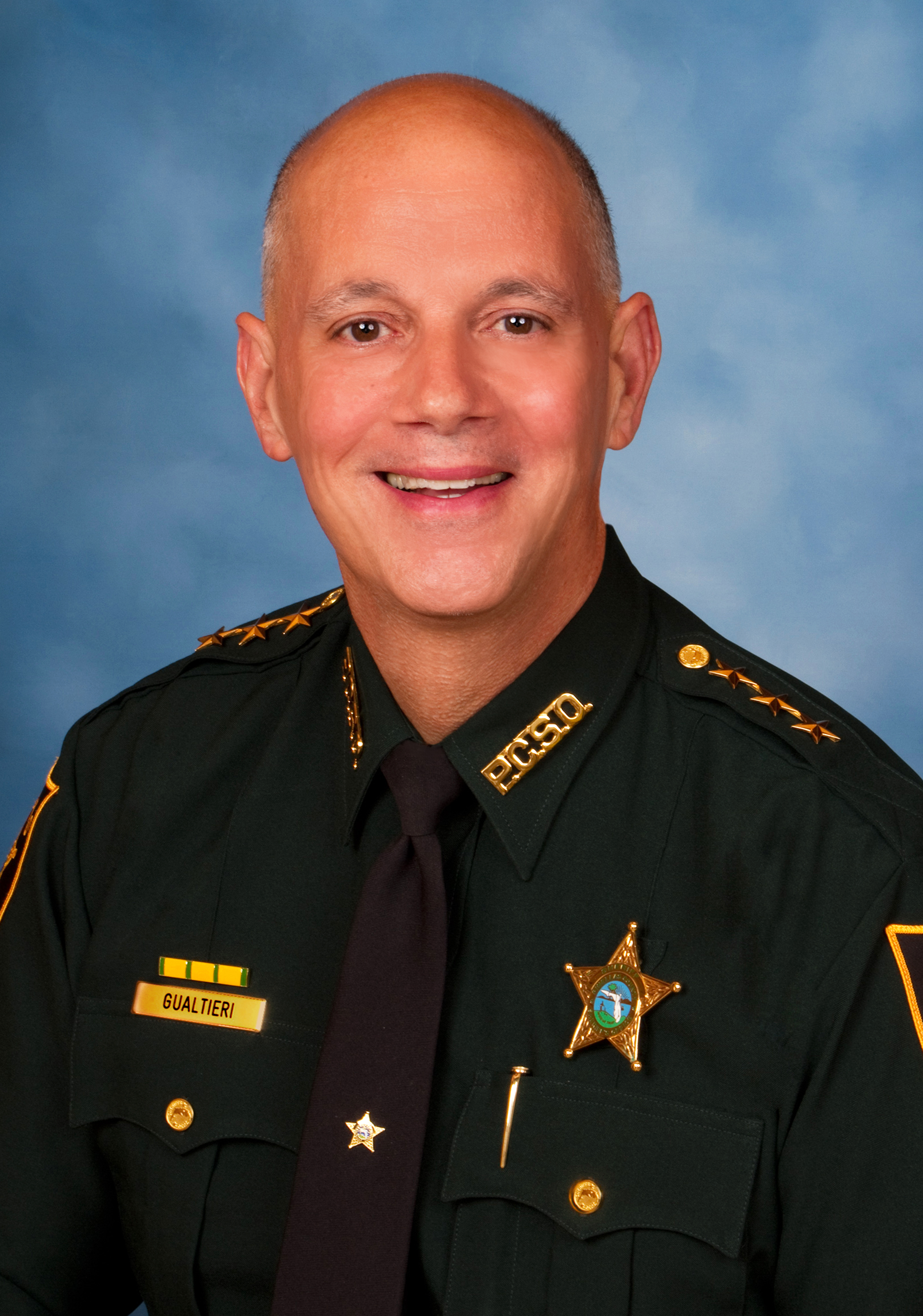
Sheriff Bob Gualtieri

On July 20, 2018, the day after the shooting, Sheriff Bob Gualtieri held a 30-minute press conference in which he announced that his agency would not charge Drejka for the shooting death of McGlockton. At the press conference, Gualtieri walked through the events leading up to the shooting and revealed the surveillance video to the media. He started by saying "I'm a big believer in this adage that just because you can, doesn't mean you should. This case may be an example of that. Nonetheless, we don't build it, we just sail it. What I mean by that is: I don't make the law, I enforce the law." Gualtieri cited Florida Statute 776.032 and stated that his office was precluded from making an arrest, due to Drejka's claim of self-defense through Florida's stand-your-ground law. Gualtieri said the investigation would continue before being turned over to the local state attorney's office.

In a second 55-minute press conference on July 31, Gualtieri defended his decision not to arrest Drejka. The Pinellas County Ministerial Alliance and NAACP Clearwater were scheduled to stand with Gualtieri during this press conference, but backed out a half hour before it began.

=== State Attorney's investigation ===
On August 1, 2018, Sheriff Gualtieri announced that the investigation had been turned over to State Attorney Bernie McCabe for review. The following day, McCabe said there was no time frame for how long it would take to complete the investigation.

On August 10, Detective George Moffett sent a capias request to State Attorney McCabe recommending charges of manslaughter with a firearm against Drejka. Moffett cited three drivers who alleged that Drejka threatened them with a gun in past incidents. Drejka was formally charged with a single count of manslaughter on August 13. Drejka pleaded not guilty to the charge on August 17.

=== Witness accounts ===
A man who witnessed the argument between Drejka and Jacobs walked into the store to report it, which led to McGlockton confronting Drejka. After McGlockton was shot, deputies interviewed multiple witnesses at the scene. Two 9-1-1 calls from witnesses were released by the Pinellas County Regional 911 Center on August 16. There were over 100 witnesses in the case.

==== Britany Jacobs ====
Jacobs was a major eyewitness in the case. She explained her decision to park her vehicle in the handicapped space; although video surveillance shows there were other spaces available, Jacobs told prosecutors that two pickup trucks blocked her from accessing those spaces. Jacobs claimed that Drejka began yelling and motioning at her. Jacobs said that she told Drejka to mind his own business. According to Jacobs, McGlockton told Drejka to "stay away from my girl" as he flung Drejka to the ground. When McGlockton was shot, she attempted to apply pressure to his wound with a shirt. Jacobs claimed the bullet struck McGlockton in the left side of the abdomen, contrary to Sheriff Gualtieri's account that he was shot in the chest.

=== Drejka's account of events ===
Within a day of the shooting, Drejka had a sign posted outside his home that read: "NO COMMENT". Drejka refused to speak to the press for over a month following the shooting; until late-August his only public account of events came from statements he made while being questioned by detectives.

==== First media interview ====
On August 31, 2018, Drejka sat down with WTSP reporter Reginald Roundtree for a jailhouse interview. Early in the interview, Drejka spoke about his early life and work profession; the financial and physical hardships he and his wife were facing; and threats made to them immediately after the shooting. Regarding McGlockton's shove, Drejka said he thought he was "tackled". Drejka stated he was in fear for his life and felt that he followed the stand-your-ground law.

Drejka said abuse of handicapped parking spaces is a sensitive issue to him, as his mother-in-law and deceased high school girlfriend were handicapped. Drejka denied he was a racist. While Drejka would not change his actions, he did apologize for the results of actions to McGlockton's family.

Drejka's wife was subsequently interviewed by Roundtree, with her face hidden by a gray curtain to protect her identity.

== Public response ==
=== Activism and protests ===
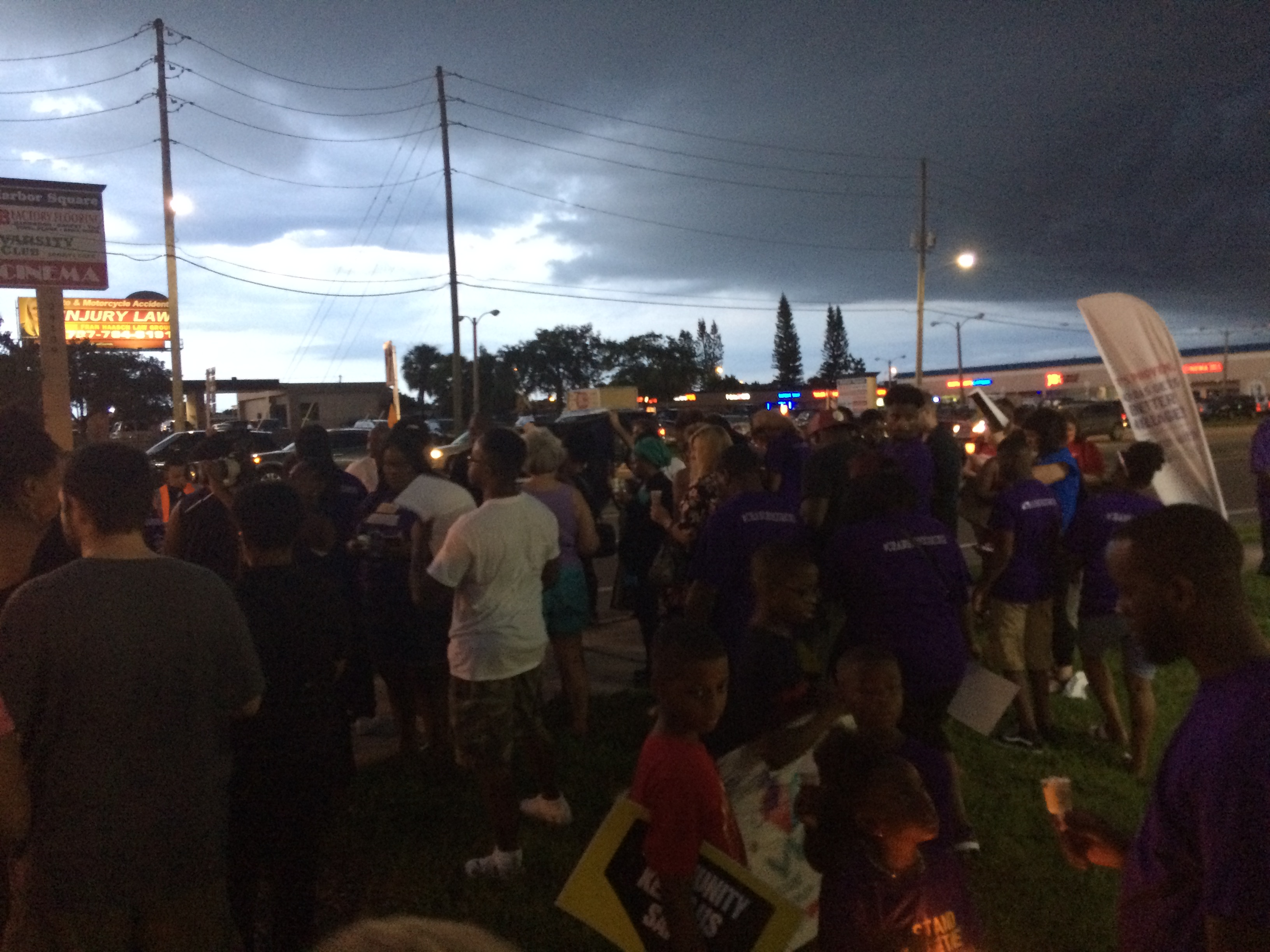
Marchers at Justice for Markeis, held on July 19, 2019

The first protest related to the shooting occurred on July 21 at the Circle A Food Store.

A vigil for McGlockton was held at Mt. Carmel Baptist Church the following afternoon, followed by a mass march from the church to the Circle A that evening.

On July 25, community activists held a fish fry at Circle A to raise money for McGlockton's family. On the morning of July 27, a protest was staged at State Attorney Bernie McCabe's office. An activist group in Jacksonville held a vigil for McGlockton and other victims of gun violence at the John A. Delaney Student Union later that night.

On July 29, members of Allendale United Methodist Church in St. Petersburg created a prayer circle in the middle of a busy intersection to protest the shooting.

On August 5, Al Sharpton and Benjamin Crump led the Markeis McGlockton Rally for Justice at St. John Primitive Baptist Church. The Tampa chapter of Black Lives Matter organized a rally outside the church that was held at the same time. On September 19, a vigil was held at Wright Park in Clearwater. Supporters gathered with McGlockton's family and friends at the same park to celebrate what would have been Markeis's 29th birthday. On the one-year anniversary of McGlockton's death anniversary, a memorial and vigil titled Justice for Markeis: A Legacy Never Forgotten was held at Mt. Zion United Methodist Church.

Color of Change created an online petition directed to State Attorney McCabe, calling for the arrest of Michael Drejka. The petition received over 10,000 signatures by July 25, and had reached over 45,000 signatures when Drejka was charged with manslaughter on August 13. On July 31, the organization opened a state-level political action committee as part of an effort to repeal Stand-Your-Ground in Florida.

While advocating in favor of Florida Amendment 4 in 2018, Marissa Alexander mentioned the McGlockton case as an example of the state's criminal justice issues.

=== Call for a DOJ investigation ===
On July 27, Democratic Party U.S. Senator Bill Nelson from Florida sent a letter to Attorney General Jeff Sessions and Acting Assistant Attorney General for Civil Rights John M. Gore, requesting the Department of Justice Civil Rights Division Criminal Section to open an investigation into the shooting death of McGlockton. The letter was signed by Nelson and four fellow Democratic lawmakers: Senators Kamala Harris from California and Cory Booker from New Jersey; and U.S. Representatives Charlie Crist and Alcee Hastings, who both represent Florida in the 13th district and 20th district, respectively.

The NAACP, along with its Florida State Conference and Clearwater/Upper Pinellas County Branch, called for a DOJ investigation as well.

=== Criticism of Gualtieri's decision ===
Sheriff Gualtieri received bipartisan criticism over his interpretation of Stand-Your-Ground and his decision to not arrest Drejka. Marion Hammer, former president and lobbyist for the National Rifle Association of America, stated that nothing in the law prevents a sheriff from making an arrest based on probable cause. Republican Party Florida State Senators Dennis Baxley and Rob Bradley, along with Florida State Representative Bobby Payne, were also critical of Gualtieri's assertion.

Five Democratic gubernatorial candidates disagreed with Sheriff Gualtieri's decision, as did Ron DeSantis, the Republican front-runner. The Pinellas County Green Party issued a statement, telling Gualtieri to "get the hell out of Pinellas!"

Within a week of the shooting, protesters created chants and T-shirts calling for Gualtieri's removal from office. McGlockton's father expressed regret voting for Gualtieri. In a statement made after Drejka was charged by the State Attorney's Office, members of Black Lives Matter pledged to "continue examining the racist policies and practices of Sheriff Gualteri and the entire structure that allows for this type of vigilantism to flourish."

==== Al Sharpton ====
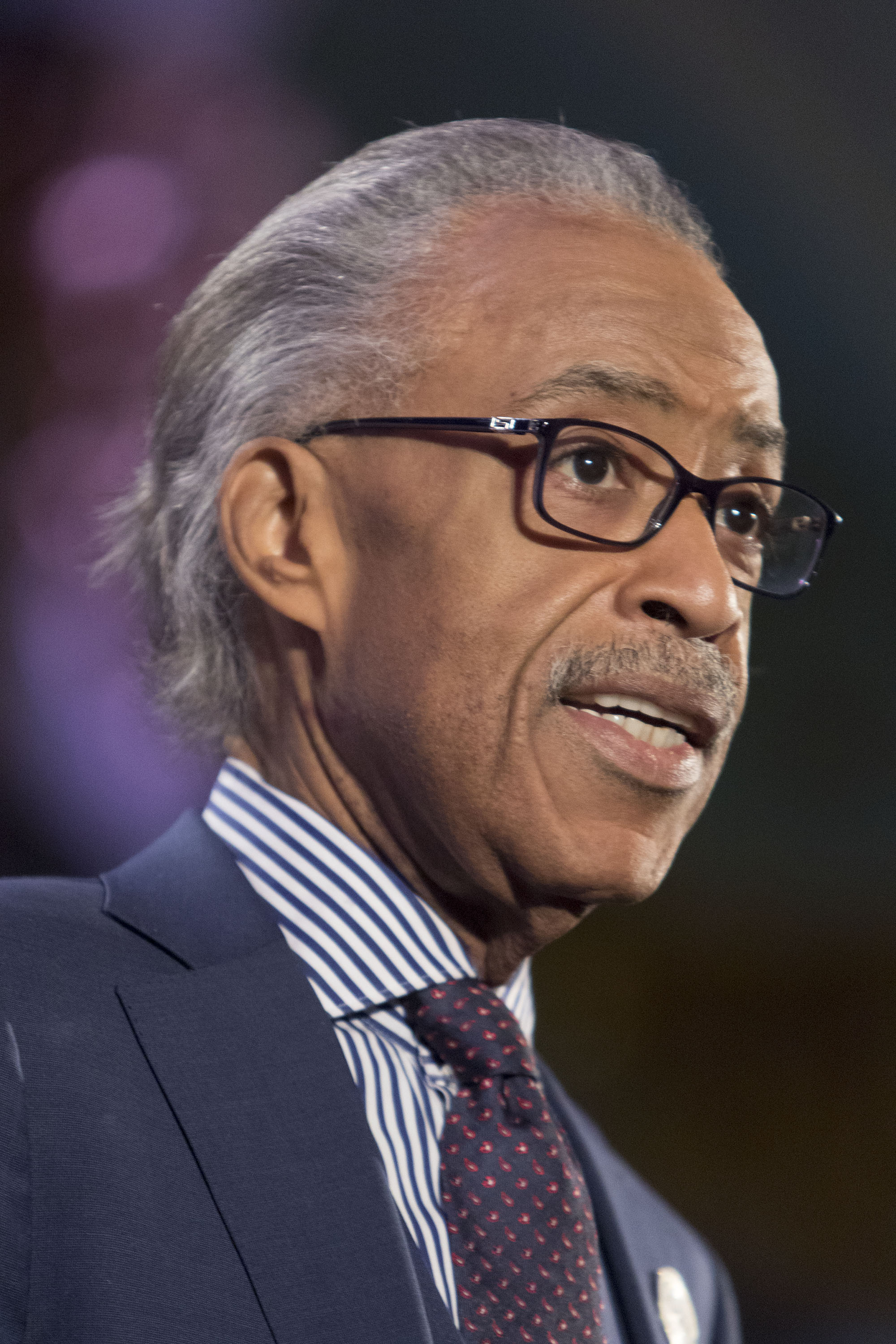
Reverend Al Sharpton

During his speech at the Markeis McGlockton Rally for Justice, Sharpton told the crowd "It is not the sheriff's job to determine whether Stand-Your-Ground applies. That ought to be decided in a courtroom and the state attorney's office." Sharpton suggested there was racial bias in the case, saying "If you got to the scene, Mr. Sheriff, and Markeis had been standing over the white man, you would have cuffed him and taken him in jail."

Sharpton then criticized Gualtieri: "(Drejka) killed an unarmed black man who was standing up for his family. Lock him up, or give up your badge." Sharpton received a standing ovation from the crowd for the comment. Lock him up, or give up your badge was the top headline on the front page of Tampa Bay Times the following day. The paper's Kirby Wilson listed Sharpton's quote at No. 17 in "18 Tampa Bay quotes that captured 2018".

During an unrelated press conference the day after the rally, Sheriff Gualtieri initially said he had no comment on the event. When asked by a reporter about Sharpton's criticism of him, Gualtieri responded: "It's a bunch of rhetoric. I don't pay much attention to it to tell you the truth. I wasn't there, and I don't really care what Al Sharpton has to say. Go back to New York. Mind your own business."

Sharpton responded to Gualtieri's remarks, comparing them to "those of sheriffs out of the 1960s that used to call civil rights leaders invited in by victims, “outside agitators.” I came at the invitation of the family & literally thousands of people in his county. Additionally, five candidates for governor joined me because he did not take care of his business. It would not be necessary for me to do so if he took care of his own, and until he does I will keep coming to Clearwater."

In a subsequent interview, Gualtieri said about his previous remarks: "I can see where it may not have been the best thing to say, to not do what he was doing, which was to ramp it up. But also I think people like him, who are doing that, need to get called out on it, and people need to say, and not be afraid to say, we're not going to tolerate that here, either. I might say the same thing again."

=== Politicians ===
The shooting death of McGlockton prompted responses from politicians. Following Drejka's arrest, Tampa Bay Times reported the shooting had become highly politicized.

Khary Penebaker, Democratic National Committee Representative from Wisconsin, wrote on Twitter: "Markeis McGlockton is dead & his shooter walks free, what the NRA wanted".

Cynthia McKinney, former Democratic U.S. Representative from Georgia and 2008 presidential nominee of the Green Party, asked her followers on Twitter: "What does this look like to you?"

Doctor Ron Daniels, the 1992 presidential nominee of the Peace and Freedom Party, urged the black community to boycott Florida.

David Jolly, former Republican U.S. Representative from Florida, said "You've seen response from elected officials who maybe believe he should have handled it differently but still generally support the sheriff. He has broad support across Pinellas County and across very diverse constituencies. This will be one of the chapters, but I don't think it will be the defining moment."

==== Florida candidates in 2018 elections ====
"I believe people are going to have Markeis McGlockton on their minds when they vote in November."

— Benjamin Crump,
Tampa Bay Times, August 8, 2018.

The shooting occurred a month before the primary elections held in Florida on August 28. General elections were held on November 6. Candidates in statewide and local elections expressed their thoughts on the shooting, with some outlining their positions on stand-your-ground laws.

Congressman Charlie Crist briefly addressed the shooting at a Clearwater town hall meeting on July 29, noting his call for a federal investigation into McGlockton's death.

During the primary race for U.S. Senator of Florida, outgoing Republican Governor Rick Scott expressed sorrow for the family of McGlockton while campaigning at an event in Lakeland, Florida; he placed emphasis on Florida's crime rate, which he claimed to be at a 47-year low. During his governorship, Scott had been criticized for his inaction regarding stand-your-ground cases. Scott's opponent, incumbent Democratic Senator Bill Nelson led a call for a federal investigation into the shooting, but did not immediately comment on SYG during this election cycle.

During the primary race for Governor of Florida, five major Democratic candidates — Andrew Gillum, Chris King, Gwen Graham, Jeff Greene and Philip Levine — pledged to repeal SYG if they were elected governor. King spoke about his opposition to the law on July 23. At a press conference in Clearwater on July 26, King said he believed race was a factor in the killing. King was in attendance at McGlockton's funeral.

Gillum addressed the shooting at length during a town hall meeting in Clearwater on July 29.

The following day, Gillum called on Governor Scott to declare a state of emergency and suspend SYG until the Florida Legislature can offer clarity on how and when the law should be applied. On the morning of August 5, Al Sharpton interviewed Greene and Gillum about the case on PoliticsNation, prior to Sharpton's arrival in Clearwater for a McGlockton rally that afternoon. The campaigns of Greene, Levine, Gillum, Graham and King announced their intentions to attend the rally led by Sharpton. The five candidates spoke at the event and pledged to repeal SYG.

On August 8, Gillum participated in a protest at Governor Scott's office in Tallahassee, where he staged a sit-in and sang "We Shall Overcome", which his campaign livestreamed on Facebook. Gillum later took a meeting with Jack Heekin, Scott's deputy chief of staff, as Scott was in Colombia that day. Also on August 8, King released a campaign ad titled "Change Hearts", which features his remarks from the August 5 rally.

Republican gubernatorial candidate Adam Putnam defended Sheriff Gualitieri's decision to not arrest Drejka, but later supported State Attorney McCabe's decision to charge Drejka with manslaughter. Putnam continued to support SYG but was open to making technical changes to help direct law enforcement officials when deciding on a relevant case. Ron DeSantis, a supporter of SYG, initially remained silent about the case. In a statement published by Politico on August 6, DeSantis defended the law but criticized Sheriff Gualtieri, stating he believed Gualtieri did not analyze it properly. Putnam then expressed his support for Gualtieri, noting that DeSantis had no endorsements from Florida sheriffs and accused DeSantis of siding with Sharpton and liberal Democrats.

In an opinion piece published the day before the primary election, Peter Schorsch of Orlando Rising listed the McGlockton shooting as one of the twenty-five defining moments of the gubernatorial primary. In a Rolling Stone profile about Andrew Gillum published six days before the general election, Jamil Smith wrote that Gillum made Markeis McGlockton "a staple of his stump speech."

During the primary race for Florida Attorney General, Democrats Sean Shaw and Ryan Torrens both stated they planned to work towards their goal of repealing SYG. Shaw met with the McGlockton family and provided his thoughts and prayers to them. Republicans Ashley Moody and Frank White both said they did not want to see the law change, though Moody showed sympathy for McGlockton's family.

== Alleged ethical issues ==
=== Allegations against Drejka ===
According to documents from the Pinellas County Clerk of the Circuit Court and Comptroller, Drejka has been named the accused aggressor in four prior road incidents ranging from 2012 to 2018. In three of these cases, prosecutors allege Drejka threatened drivers with a gun. Drejka has denied these allegations. Investigators documented the first three cases in police reports; the fourth incident, which allegedly occurred at the same location where Drejka shot McGlockton, was shared with authorities after McGlockton's death. State prosecutors sought to use Drejka's past incidents against him during his trial.

Alleged victim(s)	Alleged cause of dispute	Alleged gun threat	Year	Location	Details of allegation	Ref.
18-year-old male driver and passenger	Stopping at yellow light	Yes	2012	Clearwater, Florida (State Road 580 and U.S. 19)	Claim Drejka pointed a gun and followed them. They take down his license plate number and contact authorities. Drejka claims the driver cut him off and says he honked his horn and yelled at them but denies pointing his gun and following them. The driver and passenger decline to press charges.	
Female driver and three passengers	Driving too slowly	Yes	2012	Clearwater, Florida (Highland Avenue)	Claim Drejka threatened them with a gun. They report the incident to a Largo police officer, who pulls Drejka over. Drejka claims the driver drove too slowly in a 15-mph school zone and says he honked his horn at them but denies pointing his gun. The officer declines to arrest Drejka since the victims drove off.	
A mother with two children	Nearly making contact	No	2013	Palm Harbor, Florida (U.S. 19 Alternate and Pennsylvania Avenue)	Claims she was waiting for Drejka to pass while in the center lane waiting to turn. Drejka claims the woman nearly hit him and admits to brake-checking her, causing her to rear-end him. A Florida Highway Patrol trooper accuses Drejka of aggressive driving and cites him for the collision.	
Ricky Kelly, a male truck driver	Parking in handicapped space	Yes	2018	Clearwater, Florida (Circle A Food Store on Sunset Point Road)	Claims Drejka confronted him over parking his employer's tanker truck in the handicapped space. He accuses Drejka of threatening to shoot him and using a racial slur. The store owner Salous intervened and ordered Drejka to stop or else he would call the police, to whom Drejka replied, "I can't help myself, I keep getting myself into trouble." After the incident Drejka calls the company the driver works for and complains to the owner John Tyler, reportedly saying the driver was "lucky I didn't blow his head off." The driver reports this incident to the police in July after the shooting of Markeis McGlockton at the same location.	

== Media coverage ==
The story broke in the Tampa Bay market within hours of the shooting. When Sheriff Gualtieri declined to arrest Drejka, New York Post covered the story that day, while The New York Times covered it the following day. The story was reported on multiple television network news programs (ABC News, CBS News, and NBC News), with video of the altercation aired repeatedly. The story also received coverage on cable news networks such as CNN, MSNBC, and Fox News. On the following Monday, Jacobs appeared on ABC's Good Morning America and Nightline. Jacobs and Crump appeared on Anderson Cooper Full Circle the evening after State Attorney McCabe charged Drejka. The story was also covered nationally by The Washington Post, The Hill, The Young Turks, HuffPost, and Vox. The story was featured in African-American publications such as Blavity, Ebony, The Root, The Burning Spear, and The Grio. The story was covered internationally by BBC News, The Week, The Independent, and PerthNow. The New Zealand Herald ran the Washington Post article on their website.

The shooting is the subject of the first episode of the BET docu-series Finding Justice (2019). The episode, titled "Stand Your Ground", premiered on March 10, 2019.

== Trial, conviction and aftermath ==
On December 14, 2018, Judge Joseph Bulone set the trial of Michael Drejka to begin on August 19, 2019. Drejka was no longer using a "Stand Your Ground" defense. On August 23, Drejka was found guilty of manslaughter with the use of a firearm. On October 10, 2019, Drejka was sentenced to 20 years in prison with credit of 92 days for time served. He had faced up to 30 years in prison. McGlockton's family asked for the maximum, while the defense asked for house arrest and probation. The judge spared Drejka from the maximum sentence due to his cooperation with the police and his lack of prior convictions, but said that he was a wannabe cop and tough guy who tried to self-appoint himself as a handicapped parking space monitor.

McGlockton's father, Michael McGlockton, said "You deserve to die in prison. In the Bible, it says that in order to get into heaven we must forgive those who trespass against us. At this point in my life, I am not there yet. And if it just so happens that the Lord chooses to take me before I come to terms with this, then I will see you in hell, where you and I will finish this. Mark my words."

McGlockton's mother said she didn't hate Drejka, but would never forgive him. "Markeis was loved by so many and because of you, Michael Drejka, my son is now a memory," said McGlockton's mother, Monica Moore-Robinson.

He is imprisoned at Lancaster Correctional Institution, near Trenton, Florida, where he was attacked and reportedly wounded by another inmate on February 11, 2020. In December 2021, a three-judge panel of the Florida Second District Court of Appeal upheld the conviction and the sentencing.

== See also ==
- Crime in Florida
- Killing of Trayvon Martin, 2012 incident in Florida where civilian shooter was acquitted on self-defense grounds
- Killing of Sara-Nicole Morales, 2021 incident in Florida where no charges were brought against a motorcyclist who shot and killed a woman who was pointing a gun at him from her front lawn after she committed a hit-and-run
