= Criminal Law (Defence and the Dwelling) Act 2011 =

Irish law

Oireachtas
- Long title: An Act relating to the liability of a person regarding the use of force by him or her in his or her dwelling or in a dwelling in which he or she is a lawful occupant against a person who enters the dwellin; to amend the Non-Fatal Offences Against the Person Act 1997; and to provide for related matters.
- Citation: 2011, No. 35
- Territorial extent: Ireland
- Signed by: Michael D. Higgins
- Signed: 19 December 2011
- Commenced: 13 January 2012

Amends
- Non-Fatal Offences Against the Person Act 1997
- Status: Current legislation

The Criminal Law (Defence and the Dwelling) Act 2011 is an act of the Oireachtas which clarifies the law around self-defence in the home after the case around the death of John Ward. The act explicitly enshrines the castle doctrine into Irish law. It was first used as a defence in 2018.

== Provisions ==
The provisions of the act include:

- Explicitly laying down that it is not an offence for a person in their dwelling, (Note: A dwelling is understood as including "a building or structure (whether temporary or not) which is constructed or adapted for use as a dwelling and is being so used", a "vehicle or vessel (whether mobile or not) which is constructed or adapted for use as a dwelling and is being so used", and any part of such places, as well as the areas immediately surrounding them.) or who is a legal occupier in a dwelling, to use force in order to protect themselves or their property where they believe that the other person is trespassing and means to commit a crime.
- Ensuring that the castle doctrine does not apply to a member of the Garda Síochána acting in their official capacity, any person assisting a member of the Gardaí, or a person lawfully performing a function permitted by law.
- Allowing a person to stand their ground and ensuring that nothing within the act should compel them to abandon their dwelling.
- Absolving those who use force as outlined in the act to repel a trespasser of liability in tort cases arising from their actions.
- Amending Section 18 of the Non-Fatal Offences Against the Person Act 1997 so as to apply the Children Act 2001 to it and to clarify other points of law.
