= Death of John Ward =

2004 Irish legal case involving use of force in defence of property

Death of John "Frog" Ward
- Date: 14 October 2004
- Time: 12:30 GMT
- Location: near Cross, County Mayo; 53.52191°N 9.19961°W
- Cause: Suspected burglary
- Motive: Defence of property
- Perpetrator: Pádraig Nally
- Deaths: John "Frog" Ward

On 14 October 2004, Pádraig Nally, an Irish farmer living near the village of Cross in County Mayo, Ireland shot dead Irish Traveller John Ward, who had been trespassing on his property. In November 2005 Nally was sentenced to six years' imprisonment for manslaughter. His conviction was quashed in October 2006 and, after a retrial in December 2006, he was found not guilty of manslaughter. The case prompted the Irish government to change the law regarding the use of force by homeowners in defence of their property.

== Background ==
Pádraig Nally was a 60-year-old batchelor who lived alone on his rural 65 acre farm in the Funshinaugh area. Several burglaries had occurred on his farm in the early 2000's and Nally had become paranoid about being attacked in his home, often sitting for hours in a shed armed with a shotgun rather than sleeping in his remote farmhouse. In late September 2004, a man who Nally assumed to be an Irish Traveller made an unannounced visit to the farm, purportedly to ask about directions to a local lake. However, Nally noticed there was no fishing rods in the man's car and became suspicious of his true intentions.

John "Frog" Ward, was a 43-year-old Traveller originally from Ballyshannon. A father of 11 children, in the early 2000's he lived in Sligo Town with six of his sons sleeping in the back of a Hiace van and the rest of the family living in a caravan. The Wards eventually moved to a halting site on the outskirts of Galway City. Ward had an extensive criminal record, with approximately 80 convictions from 38 separate court appearances and had convictions for burglary, larceny and assault. Ward had also twice been committed to hospital for psychiatric treatment. In 1999, he threatened a barman with a Stanley knife. Ward attacked a car with a slash hook while a woman and two children were inside. Ward had threatened Gardaí in an incident in May 2002 and with a slash, in April 2002. At the time of his death he was facing charges of attacking Gardaí with a slash hook. The Prime Time Special (RTÉ flagship current affairs programme) brought forward new evidence showing that John Ward had a long criminal record dating back over 30 years and revealed that four bench warrants for John Ward's arrest were outstanding at the time of his death.

== Day of shooting ==
On the morning of 14 October 2004, Ward was released from the psychiatric ward of University Hospital Galway, where he had discussed his previous involvement in bare-knuckle boxing while being treated for mental health issues. He then made his way to Cross, County Mayo in a car driven by his 18-year-old son Tom Ward, and directed him to Nally's farm.

At around lunchtime, Nally heard a car arriving at his farm and went out to investigate. Tom Ward was in the driver's seat and when he saw Nally he began revving the engine loudly. When asked why he was there, Tom Ward claimed he wanted to buy a car on Nally's property for scrap metal and that his father had gone round the back of the house to take a closer look. Nally then went to the back of the building to find John "Frog" Ward exiting his house from the kitchen door. Nally immediately recognised him as the Traveller who made a suspicious visit a few weeks previously, and quickly went to a shed to retrieve his shotgun. When confronting Ward, the gun had a negligent discharge resulting in wounds to Ward's right hand, and a violent struggle ensued where Nally was forced to use a plank of wood to defend himself. Nally then retreated to the shed to reload his single barrel shotgun, and worrying Ward was running off to get reinforcements from more Traveller's he shot him dead. As he did not have a telephone, Nally then drove a neighbours house to alert the Garda Síochána and thereafter surrendered himself at his farm.

When interviewed by Detective Sergeant James Carroll under caution, Nally claimed Ward had grabbed him by the throat and attempted to kick him in the testicles, which left him with no choice but to beat him into submission. Nally also stated that he was worried Ward's son would join in the attack and was fear of his life when he reloaded the shotgun to shoot Ward a second time.

== Murder trial ==
The Central Criminal Court decided to hear the Nally case in Castlebar, making it the first murder trial in Mayo for almost a century; the jury was chosen from a pool of more than 200 locals. Travellers' support groups criticised the bias because of the jury's composition, arguing that the murder trial should have been afforded a more independent and objective forum. A member of the Law Reform Commission concurred that there was strong case to have such trials take place in Dublin. Nally pleaded not guilty to murder and manslaughter charges.

=== Prosecution evidence ===
According to state pathologist Marie Cassidy, Ward was shot twice on 14 October 2004. The first shot injured Ward in the hand and hip. The second shot was fired from above and Ward was in a crouched position at the time. The person who shot him was standing over him and the shot was fired at close range. Nally would later say in evidence he was afraid Ward would kill him, which was why he fired the second shot (to frighten him [Ward]). The court heard that a post-mortem examination and toxicology tests on Mr Ward's body found traces of cannabis, opiates and tranquillisers. It was also emphasised that Mr Ward had been receiving hospital treatment and was on medication for a condition.

Tom Ward, the chief witness for the prosecution, was himself serving an eleven-month sentence at the time of the trial, for possessing a knife and for theft. According to Tom, on the day in question he and his father were simply driving around the Mayo / Galway border area when they spotted an old car beside Nally's house, and as they traded second hand cars they decided to cold call to see if they could purchase it from the house owner. His father got out of the vehicle to knock on the door to see if anyone was home, when suddenly Pádraig Nally appeared beside the car and demanded to know what Tom was doing there. On being informed his father wanted to buy one of his cars, Nally walked off in the direction John Ward had gone, and Tom Ward thereafter heard a gunshot. We asked directly by the defense if they had in fact arrived at Nally's farm with the intention of carrying out a burglary, Tom Ward denied the accusation.

Under further cross-examination, Tom Ward also denied a suggestion that his father was a bare knuckle boxer, and he said he had no knowledge of a suggestion his father had threatened a Garda with a slashhook. Tom Ward said that on the evening of 13 October 2004 he had bought the car he and his father had travelled in to Pádraig Nally's house the following day. He said he had bought it from other Travellers, but he declined to give the court any names. Ward also admitted buying and selling around 15 different cars in the 6 months before the fatal shooting of his father, but denied changing vehicles often in an effort to prevent his identification while looking for properties to burgle. Pádraig Nally's barrister had earlier stated a car bearing a similar description had previously been seen in the vicinity of Cross a short distance from where a chainsaw was reported stolen.

=== Defence submissions ===
The court heard that Nally had become increasingly agitated and worried that his property would be targeted by local thieves as a number of farms in the area had recently been burgled. His own home had been broken into in 2003 and a chainsaw stolen from one of his sheds in February 2004. Other items had disappeared from around his house and farm. This caused him to be unable to sleep properly. Following the break-in in February 2004 he had kept a gun in a garage and had started to keep registration numbers of strange cars travelling through the district. Friends and neighbours noted Nally had become preoccupied with looking after his farm and terrified that the robbers would return. He told the jury he was at the end of his tether and, according to counsel, was "agitated and fearful, even paranoid" about his safety. "Did he suddenly, after 60 years, become a murderer?" asked Brendan Grehan, Nally's lawyer, describing his client as a law-abiding member of his community who acted in self-defence.

Nally alleged he had met John "Frog" Ward previously when Ward had called to his house two weeks before 14 October and had enquired if it would be a good day for fishing. Ward, said Nally, had no fishing tackle with him and this led him to be suspicious of Ward. He did not like the look of him.

The defence argued provocation, as Nally could have reasonably assumed John Ward had been responsible for the theft of the chainsaw and perhaps the numerous other thefts since, as Mr. Nally recognised the vehicle outside his home on 14 October as that bearing the description of the one seen in the vicinity of his home the day his chainsaw was stolen (in 2003). The provocation was, seemingly, the fact that Nally's house had been burgled some time previously, that Ward had called to his house some weeks previously and had acted suspiciously and that Ward was on his premises on 14 October, without authorisation.

=== Verdict and sentencing ===
Nally was acquitted of murder, but convicted of manslaughter. The judge, Mr Justice Paul Carney, refused to allow the jury to consider a full defence argument of self-defence.

On 11 November 2005, Nally was sentenced to six years in prison for the manslaughter of Ward. Mr Justice Paul Carney remarked: "This is undoubtedly the most socially divisive case I have had to try. It is also the most difficult one in which I have had to impose sentence.". The judge said he would take into consideration Nally's unblemished past, his low risk of re-offending, his willingness to show remorse for his crime and the fact that the prosecution's case was based largely on testaments given by the farmer.

== Appeal ==
Nally was refused leave to appeal by the Central Criminal Court against his conviction and six-year jail sentence.

The case was then appealed to the Court of Criminal Appeal. Nally's lawyers had argued at his appeal that the trial judge had erred in law by not allowing the jury to consider a defence of full self-defence and by not allowing it to find Nally not guilty. He had directed that the jury had to find Nally guilty of murder or guilty of manslaughter, and ruled that an acquittal verdict based on the evidence would be perverse.

In October 2006, the Court of Criminal Appeal quashed Pádraig Nally's conviction for manslaughter and ordered a retrial. The Court said that the jury should not have been denied the opportunity to return a verdict of not guilty, even if such a verdict may have flown in the face of the evidence.

== Retrial ==
Pádraig Nally's retrial took place in December 2006. Similar evidence was submitted to the court, including evidence of Ward's character and previous convictions and both Nally's and Ward's mental states on the day in question. The jury of eight men and four women acquitted Nally of manslaughter and he walked free. Ward's widow Marie, who had since married an asylum seeker from West Africa, announced she would be taking a civil action for damages in the wake of the verdict.

== Legacy ==
In 2009, the government announced its plan to introduce a new law of self-defence in 2010 upon recommendation by the Law Reform Commission which would codify the existing common law position on the use of force in defence of property. The Criminal Law (Defence and the Dwelling) Act 2011 was enacted on 19 December 2011.

Although widely heralded as "allowing" homeowners to exercise reasonable force in defending their home, the Act in fact did nothing to change the legal position as it existed at the time of Nally's trial, other than to place the previous common law jurisprudence on a statutory footing.

== See also ==
- Castle doctrine
- Defence of property
- Joe Horn shooting controversy
- 1984 New York City Subway shooting
- Tony Martin (farmer)
- Munir Hussain case
