= The Trace (website) =

American journalism outlet

- Formation: 19 June 2015
- Tax ID no.: 47-4175513
- Location: New York City
- Owner: Trace Media Inc.
- Managing director: James Burnett
- Editor in chief: Tali Woodward
- Executive editor: Craig Hunter
- President: John Feinblatt
- Staff: 29 (2026)
- Website: www.thetrace.org

The Trace is an American non-profit journalism outlet devoted to gun-related news in the United States. It was established in 2015 with seed money from the largest gun control advocacy group Everytown for Gun Safety, which was founded by former New York City mayor Michael Bloomberg, and went live on 19 June of that year. The site's editor in chief is Tali Woodward, and it shares its president, John Feinblatt, with Everytown for Gun Safety.

== History ==
John Feinblatt said the idea for The Trace stemmed from the difficulties faced by Everytown for Gun Safety, where he serves as President, to obtain "information about gun violence." He used the example of the Tiahrt Amendment (named after its author U.S. Representative Todd Tiahrt (R-KS)), a provision of the 2003 DOJ appropriations bill that prohibited the ATF's National Tracing Center from sharing its firearms trace database with anyone besides law enforcement agencies or prosecutors in a criminal investigation. The Amendment also "blocks any data legally released from being admissible in civil lawsuits against gun sellers or manufacturers," and was supported by the National Rifle Association of America (NRA). Everytown for Gun Safety, and other organizations say that gun trace data is "important information needed for solving crimes such as "tracing guns from the point of sale to their use in violent crimes".

Former New York City mayor Michael Bloomberg had founded Everytown for Gun Safety "which was created after the Sandy Hook Elementary School shooting in 2012 where more than 20 people died, most of them young children. The editorial news director at the time, James Burnett said, "We do bring a point of view to the issue of gun violence: We believe there is too much of it. But our focus is on a related problem: the shortage of information on the subject at large."

== Partners ==
The Trace partners with other national and local media organizations, including The Atlantic, Slate, Lenny The Daily News, Vice, The Guardian, Tampa Bay Times, Newsweek, The Huffington Post, TIME Fusion, The Undefeated, Politico Magazine, Essence, The Chicago Sun-Times, and The New Yorker.

In a partnership with The Atlantic, The Trace investigated the reasons the Centers for Disease Control and Prevention (CDC), which has an annual budget of over $11 billion, stopped doing research on gun violence. In a Trace interview, Mark L. Rosenberg, a founder of the CDC's National Center for Injury Prevention and Control, the division of the agency responsible for doing gun violence research, Rosenberg said that it was "the leadership of the CDC who stopped the agency from doing gun violence research. The Injury Center, established by Rosenberg and five colleagues in 1992, had an annual budget of c. $260,000 focused on "identifying the root causes of firearm deaths and the best methods to prevent them". Rosenberg told The Trace in 2016, "Right now, there is nothing stopping them from addressing this life-and-death national problem." It was previously assumed that the research was not being done because of a sentence in the 1996 Dickey Amendment, which was supported by the NRA, and inserted into the 1996 appropriations bill which stated "none of the funds made available for injury prevention and control at the Centers for Disease Control and Prevention may be used to advocate or promote gun control". In 1997, "Congress redirected all of the money previously earmarked for gun violence research to the study of traumatic brain injury." David Satcher, who was the CDC head from 1993 to 1998, advocated for gun violence research until he left in 1998. In 1999 Rosenberg was fired. Over a dozen "public health insiders, including current and former CDC senior leaders" told Trace interviewers that CDC senior leaders took an overly cautious stance in their interpretation of the Dickey amendment. They could have done much more.

== Themes ==
The Trace keeps track of NRA spending on elections. The NRA broke its own record of $31.7 million in 2014 with $36.3 million in 2016 in support of Donald Trump's candidacy for president.

== Dispute with Students for Concealed Carry ==
An investigation by Adam Weinstein, published in The Trace in 2015, described Students for Concealed Carry (SCC), an organization that supports campus carry, as being backed and influenced by the Leadership Institute (LI), an organization sponsoring conservative student activism, and Gun Owners of America, a gun-rights lobbying organization. SCC, in turn, denied being founded by or receiving regular funding from outside groups, claiming that the organization is student-run while also acknowledging ties to other gun-rights organizations and saying that some campus chapters received grants from the Leadership Institute.

== The Gunfighters ==
NPR described The Trace as an independent journalism organization "dedicated to covering America's gun violence crisis."

Mike Spies, who has been reporting on the gun lobby since 2015, wrote a series called "The Gunfighters", which investigated the influence of the National Rifle Association of America (NRA) on state gun policy and politics, including the NRA's promotion of a grading system for lawmakers from A+ to F (published in an article with the New York Daily News), and the role of the NRA and NRA lobbyists such as Marion Hammer in opposing proposed legislation requiring the safe storage of weapons and in promoting "stand-your-ground" legislation.

In articles in 2016, Spies described how the NRA began to use their scoring system to influence judicial nominations. The first attempt was during the confirmation proceedings of Supreme Court justice Sonia Sotomayor in 2009 at the request of Mitch McConnell and again in 2010 with Elena Kagan. In 2011, the NRA opposed Caitlin Halligan's nomination to the Court of Appeals for the D.C. Circuit and as a result, Senate Republicans blocked her confirmation. In 2016, the NRA opposed the nomination of Merrick Garland to the Supreme Court because he did not "respect the individual right to bear arms" - in 2007, Garland had "cast a vote in favor of allowing his court to review a crucial opinion by a three-judge panel that had found D.C.'s handgun ban unconstitutional." This article was cited in The Second Amendment and Gun Control: Freedom, Fear, and the American Constitution which presented both sides of the debate between those who "favour more gun controls and those who would prefer fewer of them."

== See also ==
- Institute for Nonprofit News (member)
