= Gun violence in U.S. schools =

Gun violence within schools in the U.S.A

Gun violence is the leading cause of death for children and teens under the age of 20 in the United States. Since the Columbine High School massacre in 1999, there have been 417 cases of gun violence in schools as of September 2024. The frequency of school shootings increased dramatically after 2018, with a slight decrease in 2020 during the early part of the COVID-19 pandemic.

At least 203 children, educators, and others have been killed in school shootings since 1999 and an additional 441 people injured as of September 6, 2024.

Efforts to end gun violence at schools have primarily focused on policy. Members of the Republican Party have primarily sought to arm school staff and expand conceal carry laws. Democratic Party members have focused on strengthening background checks required to purchase firearms. Both parties have also supported policy aiming to assist teens and firearm owners in mental health awareness and treatment. Various advocacy groups support expanded background checks as well as assault weapons bans, safe storage laws, and other policies.

The federal government of the United States does not track school shootings, but a number of private organizations do: most notably the Gun Violence Archive.

== Perpetrators ==
Perpetrators of school shootings tend to be male and have access to a loaded firearm. They are more likely than their peers to suffer from a mental illness (anxiety, depression, psychopathy), to have had a history of violence or delinquency, to have experienced a traumatic event in their childhood, and to report having been bullied by their peers. School shootings are more likely to occur in conservative communities with specific types of cultures around access to guns and masculinity. They are also more likely to occur in larger schools. Relatedly, perpetrators are likely to have moved from small schools with lower than average student/teacher ratios to larger schools with less support prior to the event. School shootings are more likely to occur in communities with higher economic stressors.

== Types and locations of school shootings ==
The Washington Post distinguishes between school shootings that are "targeted" (intentionally aimed at one or more victims), "indiscriminate" (not aimed at any particular victim), and those that are "unclassifiable." Approximately 63% were targeted, 22% were indiscriminate, and 13.2% were unclassifiable.

The United States Government Accountability Office divides these categories further. Their work finds that 31% of school shootings are "dispute/grievance related" (i.e. stemming from a conflict, fight, or gang-related issue), 16% are accidental (when a gun is brought to campus and accidentally discharges), 14% are intentional but indiscriminate in their choice of victims, 11% are suicides or attempted suicides, 9% are unknown regarding the perpetrators intent, 7% are targeting family members or dating partners, 5% are targeting an unrelated victim, 4% are connected to illegal activity such as drugs, and 3% are classified as "other" and don't fit the aforementioned categories.

Of school shootings that occur outside of the school structure, 43% are grievance-related. Of those that occur inside the school itself, 31% are accidental, 28% are targeted but indiscriminate in nature, 17% are suicides or attempted suicides, and 13% are dispute-related.

School shootings are more likely to occur in states with larger populations. California, Texas, and Florida have had the most incidents. When controlled for population, Kentucky, Maryland, and Alabama have the highest rates of death in school shooting incidents.

95% of school shootings have occurred at public schools. Approximately 73% were at high schools, 22% at middle schools, and 2% at elementary schools.

== Correlates of gun violence in schools ==
=== Demographic variables ===
95–96% of perpetrators of school firearm violence have been male. The median age of a perpetrator of a school shooting is 16.

People of all races commit gun violence in schools, however the nature of these incidents differ by race. White perpetrators commit disproportionately deadly assaults, these are often mass, indiscriminate cases. People of color are more likely to target an individual victim in a case related to an interpersonal dispute.

About half of the perpetrators of gun violence at schools were current students or alumni of the school while 12% have no relation to the school (others include police officers or student resource officers (4%), teachers or staff (4%), parents or relatives of students (5%), other (6%) or unknown (19%)).

=== Individual-level factors ===
==== Psychological factors ====
In a 2004 report, the Federal Bureau of Investigation (FBI) found that 27% of school shooters are influenced by "suicide or desperation." In a study on adolescent boys, researchers found that boys experiencing depression and anxiety had a 13% increased likelihood of bringing a firearm to school. Additional research has also found a link between people who have schizophrenia-spectrum disorders and those who test high on scales of psychopathy and engagement in mass violence. However, this research also notes that most people with these disorders do not commit violence.

==== History of violence and delinquency ====
According to the FBI, 63% of perpetrators of school shootings had a known history of using weapons. 43% of perpetrators of school violence had a history of abuse against animals, mostly targeting dogs and cats. 70% abused dogs and cats, but not near their home. 30% committed violence against their own or their neighbors pets. Only 18% of perpetrators expressed empathy for animals. Most notably, the perpetrator of the Sandy Hook Elementary School shooting was a self-proclaimed "ethical vegan."

People with a history of delinquency or close friendships with peers who had a history of delinquency is also associated with one's likelihood of bringing a firearm to school. Boys who reported having a history of being in fights at school were 72% more likely to bring firearms to school.

==== Bullying or a sense of exclusion ====
75% of perpetrators of school shootings claim to have been the victims of bullying. Research by Michael Kimmel suggests that the specific type of bullying they face – gay baiting or threats to a boy's masculinity – may lead to these boys feeling socially rejected. He further argues that perpetrators of school shootings are "overconformists"—to a particular idea of masculinity that is threatened by this bullying and which justifies violent revenge.

=== Family-level factors ===
The relationship between family-level factors of perpetrators and gun violence in schools has received little direct research. Of that which exists, it appears that the experience of childhood trauma correlates with perpetration of gun violence. 72% of school shooters report at least one experience of childhood trauma, these include incidents of abuse, loss of a parent, foster care placement, and other traumatic events.

=== Cultural-level factors ===
==== Local community cultural values ====
Sociologist Michael Kimmel's work on indiscriminate mass school shootings finds that, among this type of incident, the political ideology of the community may be a correlate. In looking at all cases between 1982 and 2008 (n=32), he found that 22 school shootings occurred in conservative states. Of the remaining ten cases, six occurred in conservative counties. Kimmel asserts, however, that it is not political ideology that corresponds with gun violence in schools, but three cultural values associated with conservatism. First, these locations had a culture in which gun ownership was widespread and supported; second, they had a culture around gender that encouraged a particular form of tough masculinity; and third, school cultures that tolerated bullying and gender-based harassment. Kimmel argues that perpetrators of mass violence (in and beyond schools) have been taught and internalized a narrow and specific story about masculinity that he calls "aggrieved entitlement." Specifically, he argues, adherents demonstrate a learned sense of entitlement that justifies violence and revenge against people who have harmed them. According to the Secret Service's Safe School Initiative Report, 61% of school shooters were motivated by "a desire for revenge."

==== Access to guns ====
According to a 2021 study conducted by faculty at Northeastern and Harvard Universities, 33% of households with children had guns, 21% of these had guns that were both loaded and unlocked in the home. Nationwide, 4.6 million children live in homes with guns that are both loaded and accessible. Most gun owners with accessible weapons in their homes are white men living in rural or suburban areas. 65% of minors who commit gun violence acquire firearms from a family member. In 2019, 4% of students report having access to a loaded weapon either at or away from school. Boys report having greater access than girls (5% vs. 3%). This is a decrease in access from 2009 in which 6% of children reported having access to loaded weapons; and 8% of boys reported the same. Boys in urban school districts are 44.9% less likely to report bringing a firearm to school than are those attending rural districts.

The National Center for Educational Statistics reports that approximately 4% of high school students report carrying firearms to school or possessing firearms on school property at least once in the previous month. The National Center for Educational Statistics reports that in the 2019–2020 academic year, 2,400 were reported to have a gun at school, a rate of 5 per 100,000 students. The number of children bringing firearms to school ranges significantly by state. Missouri, New Jersey, Rhode Island, Massachusetts, Arizona and Pennsylvania had the lowest rates (below 1 in 100,000) while Illinois, New Mexico, Arkansas and Louisiana had the highest rates (greater than 10 in 100,000).

Research suggest that certain gun control policies have an impact on rates of gun violence in schools. For example, Anderson and Sabia find that Child-Access-Prevention (CAP) laws decrease the rate of students bringing weapons to school (by about 18.5%) and the rate of students being threatened with weapons at school (by 19%).

Ghiani, Hawkins, and Baum find similar results when examining a series of gun policies. In their research, they considered 133 different types of gun laws ranging from those that restrict access to guns (e.g., background checks, concealed carry permits) to those focused on gun safety (e.g., assault weapons bans, ammunition regulation) and the degree to which they were associated with students self-reporting of carrying guns to school, the number of times students reported being threatened with gun violence, and the number of days students missed school because they felt unsafe. They found that as gun safety measures increased in a state, student reports of guns at school; threats; and missed days decreased.

=== Structural-level factors ===
==== School security measures ====
92% of schools in the United States have written plans for active shooter events. 78% lock building doors, 81% have security cameras, 68% require the use of staff identity cards, 67% have classrooms that lock from the inside, 53% have random locker checks, 11% of high schools have random use of metal detectors, and 13% of primary/46% of secondary schools have security staff present at all times.

It is unclear how successful these efforts are at preventing or deterring gun violence in schools. Most were implemented without clear empirical evidence of their effectiveness. One study, however, found that metal detectors significantly decreased the frequency with which students brought weapons to school (from 78% to 14%) in New York City.

There are, obviously, both benefits and downsides of in-school surveillance. Such practices increase parent satisfaction that schools are taking measures to protect children and may, indeed, prevent some incidents of violence. However, efforts can simultaneously lead to kids feeling unsafe in schools; can create antagonistic relationships between students and teachers, and exacerbate the school-to-prison pipeline; and can be quite costly for already underfunded school systems.

Despite all of these efforts, another factor that contributes to gun violence in schools is the failure of systems of surveillance. Perpetrators have learned to circumvent security measures by pulling fire alarms or using 3-D printers to manufacture guns.

==== Size of school ====
School shootings are more likely to happen at schools with large enrollments. Perpetrators are disproportionately likely to have previously attended a smaller school with lower than average student-teacher ratios before transferring to the larger schools where they committed the act of violence (either from elementary to middle school within district, or between different sized districts). Academics suggest that the experience of transferring from small schools with greater support to larger ones might exacerbate mental health challenges experienced by perpetrators.

=== Societal-level factors ===
==== Economic tensions in community ====
Gun violence in schools generally increases when certain economic stressors are present or increasing, including local foreclosure rates, consumer confidence levels, and unemployment rates. It is more likely to occur in communities with high levels of poverty, lower median income levels, high levels of adults who did not complete high school, and high levels of homelessness. However, schools with characteristics such as being located in rural or suburban areas, having lower levels of poverty, and with more white students in attendance may experience more severe instances of school shootings.

== Proposed solutions ==
Efforts to end gun violence in schools vary and are often shaped by political ideology.

Republican lawmakers have suggested that allowing school staff to carry fire arms might decrease incidents of gun violence in schools. However, this recommendation runs counter to the recommendations of gun safety and education experts who suggest that more guns in school increases risk to children and teachers. Democrats have primarily focused their efforts on strengthening background checks to ensure that people who have access to firearms do not have a history of domestic violence or other crimes.

Non-profits that seek to end gun violence in schools are seeking the passage of policy intended to restrict access to certain types of guns. For example, Sandy Hook Promise is involved in advocating for the GOSAFE Act which would stop sales of military-style weapons and large-capacity magazines for firearms and background checks for gun purchases. They also seek to pass policy regarding the safe storage of firearms in the home, extreme risk protection orders which empowers courts to remove guns from people identified as in crisis, and to keep privately made firearms from kids. The Brady Campaign also advocates for background checks, an assault weapons ban, and safe gun storage. Everytown for Gun Safety has an extensive list of policies they support – that range from background checks, waiting periods, banning guns on campuses, restricting open carry laws, and efforts to improve threat assessments of potential perpetrators.

School districts nationwide have primarily focused on making entrance to school buildings more difficult by requiring visitors to check in, locking doors, and tinting windows. Preparation has also focused on practicing lockdown drills. Research suggests that these drills may have negative impacts on students.
