= Everytown for Gun Safety =

United States gun control advocacy organization

- Formation: 2013; 13 years ago
- Type: 501(c)(4); 501(c)(3)
- Tax ID no.: 26-1598353
- Registration no.: 20-8802884
- Headquarters: Manhattan, New York City, U.S.
- Region served: United States
- President: John Feinblatt
- Subsidiaries: Moms Demand Action, Students Demand Action
- Affiliations: Everytown for Gun Safety Support Fund, Everytown For Gun Safety Action Fund
- Revenue: $57.1 million (2024)
- Expenses: $56.5 million (2024)
- Website: everytown.org
- Formerly called: Mayors Against Illegal Guns; Moms Demand Action for Gun Sense in America

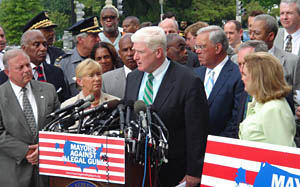
Congressman Jim Moran (D-VA) speaking at an event for Mayors Against Illegal Guns

Everytown for Gun Safety is an American non-profit organization which advocates for gun control and against gun violence. Everytown was formed in 2013 due to a merger between Mayors Against Illegal Guns and Moms Demand Action for Gun Sense in America.

The organization works to "support efforts to educate policy makers, as well the press and the public, about the consequences of gun violence, and promote efforts to keep guns out of the hands of criminals". The group has focused on efforts to require universal background checks on firearms purchases. The organization also produces research and studies on gun violence. Everytown for Gun Safety is largely financed by Michael Bloomberg.

The group has drawn criticism, in 2009, for example, several mayors stated that they discovered they had been listed as supporters of the organization without their knowledge or consent.

== History ==
=== Origin ===
Mayors Against Illegal Guns (MAIG) was formed in April 2006 during a summit co-hosted by mayors Michael Bloomberg of New York City and Thomas Menino of Boston at New York's mayoral residence, Gracie Mansion. Bloomberg and Menino co-chaired the coalition. The initial group consisted of 15 mayors who signed a statement of principles. By the end of 2014, there were 855 mayors in the coalition.

In April 2014, MAIG merged with Moms Demand Action to form Everytown for Gun Safety. The launch of Everytown occurred nearly one year after the U.S. Senate debated a series of changes to federal gun laws in the wake of the Sandy Hook Elementary School shooting, including a failed amendment, sponsored by West Virginia Senator Joe Manchin (D) and Pennsylvania Senator Pat Toomey (R), that would have required background checks for all gun sales taking place at gun shows or over the internet. According to Bloomberg, Everytown was founded to match the National Rifle Association of America in political influence.

== Issues ==
=== Background checks ===
The organization advocates for expanding the background check system for gun buyers through changes in state and federal laws, and supports legislation that would require background checks for all gun sales. The organization also supports state laws requiring the reporting of mental health records to the national background check system.

=== Assault weapons ===
Everytown supports banning assault weapons.

=== Domestic violence ===
Everytown has supported laws that prohibit domestic abusers from obtaining firearms. Internal research produced by Everytown concludes that states that require background checks for private handgun sales have lower rates of intimate partner gun violence than states that do not require background checks. According to the group, Everytown supported the passage of laws intended to block convicted domestic abusers and people subject to domestic violence restraining orders in six states in 2014: Louisiana, Minnesota, New Hampshire, Vermont, Washington, and Wisconsin.

=== Preventable injuries ===
The organization supports gun safety technology and laws requiring safe storage of firearms to prevent accidental child gun deaths, citing the high rate of firearm injuries among American children compared to other countries.

=== Gun trafficking ===
The organization also favors strengthening penalties for gun trafficking through the creation of a federal gun trafficking statute.

=== Tiahrt Amendment ===
Prior to the inception of Everytown, a priority goal of Mayors Against Illegal Guns was to repeal the Tiahrt Amendment, named after its sponsor, former Congressman Todd Tiahrt (R-KS). Since its passage in 2003 as an amendment to the Commerce, Justice, Science and Related Agencies Appropriations Act, the Tiahrt Amendment has forbidden the Bureau of Alcohol, Tobacco, Firearms and Explosives (ATF) from releasing information from its firearm trace database to anyone other than a law enforcement agency or prosecutor in connection with a specific criminal investigation, and any data so released is deemed inadmissible in a civil lawsuit. Representative Tiahrt stated that his amendment intended to protect the privacy of gun owners and to prevent abuse of the data by anyone outside of law enforcement agencies.

Mayors Against Illegal Guns sought the repeal of the Tiahrt Amendment for these reasons:

- The Tiahrt Amendment restricts access of state and local law enforcement authority to gun trace data, hindering municipal police departments' ability to track down sellers of illegal guns, to investigate gun trafficking patterns, and to make connections between individual gun-related crimes. Mayor Bloomberg has called the Amendment "an insult to the thousands of police officers that face the threat of illegal guns."
- The Tiahrt Amendment requires that NICS background check records be destroyed within 24 hours. According to MAIG, this makes it harder for law enforcement authorities to catch law-breaking gun dealers who falsify their records and makes it more difficult to identify and track down straw purchasers who buy guns on behalf of criminals who wouldn't be able to pass a background check or prohibited purchasers who buy firearms themselves due to errors in the background check process.
- The Tiahrt Amendment denies the ATF the authority to require dealer inventory checks to detect lost and stolen guns. Under current rules, the ATF can conduct a warrantless search of any licensed gun dealer once per year.

Joining Mayors Against Illegal Guns in supporting the repeal of the Tiahrt Amendment were 10 national law enforcement organizations, including the International Association of Chiefs of Police, the International Brotherhood of Police Officers, the Major Cities Chiefs Association and the Police Executive Research Forum; state law enforcement associations representing 22 states; and individual police chiefs representing 39 states. The Brady Center to Prevent Gun Violence has pointed out that the ATF under the Bush administration (2001–2008) was unable to produce any evidence that law enforcement officers were harmed by the agency's release of crime gun trace data prior to 2003.

In July 2007, after the House Appropriations Committee rebuffed attempts to repeal the amendment, the Senate Appropriations Committee went further, approving a bill that, according to The New York Times, "threaten[ed] law enforcement officials with prison time for using gun tracing data beyond a specific investigation, say, for identifying and targeting trafficking patterns."

Congressman Tiahrt responded to MAIG's position on his amendment in a congressional statement in 2007:

At issue was a campaign urging repeal of the Tiahrt Amendment, which prohibits the Bureau of Alcohol, Tobacco, Firearms and Explosives (ATF) from releasing gun trace data to the public. The ATF gun trace database contains investigation-specific information and is made available to law enforcement agencies and prosecutors for criminal investigations. The ATF and the Fraternal Order of Police (FOP), the nation's largest law enforcement organization, support the Tiahrt Amendment and have requested its reauthorization every year since 2003. Both organizations claimed repeal of the Tiahrt Amendment would jeopardize ongoing criminal investigations and risk the lives of undercover law enforcement officers ... The organization Mayors Against Illegal Guns is behind the Tiahrt repeal campaign. The group claims to have the support of numerous police chiefs across the country, which is also misleading according to National FOP President Chuck Canterbury:

"The mayors would have you believe that law enforcement supports giving them the information on gun traces because many of their employees--namely police chiefs, who often serve at the pleasure of the mayor--have publicly backed their coalition," explained Canterbury. "But the officers in the field who are actually working illegal gun cases know that releasing sensitive information about pending cases can jeopardize the integrity of an investigation or even place the lives of undercover officers in danger. That is why the Fraternal Order of Police has always supported language protecting firearms trace data, now known as the 'Tiahrt amendment.' For the men and women in uniform who are fighting illegal guns, it is a matter of officer safety and good police work."

NY Police Commissioner Ray Kelly, the Bureau of Alcohol Tobacco Firearms and Explosives (ATF) and the FOP have all requested this language to protect investigations and law enforcement officers. Hopefully it is true that not one law enforcement officer ever died prior to the enactment of the Tiahrt protection—Rep. Tiahrt joins the FOP, ATF and others in supporting a policy that will keep it that way."

Kelly, however, has participated in events calling for the repeal of the Tiahrt Amendment. The ATF under the Obama administration has issued no formal position on the amendment. While a Senator, President Barack Obama stated:

At a time when bloodshed on our streets is on the rise, making sure that our law enforcement officers have all the tools they need to fight crime should be our top priority. But instead of providing those tools, the Tiahrt Amendment ties the hands of police in their effort to halt illegal gun trafficking and sales. I am proud to join the Mayors Against Illegal Guns in their fight against this dangerous legislation. Our communities and the brave men and women who risk their lives everyday to protect us deserve more from Congress.

His administration, however, sought only minor modifications to the amendment during the most recent appropriations cycle.

=== Constitutional carry ===
Moms Demand Action has also advocated against constitutional carry, also known as permitless carry, unrestricted carry, or Vermont carry, which refers to legislation that legalizes the public concealed or open carry of firearms without a license or permit. On March 21, 2022, Indiana became the 24th state to legalize constitutional carry; Moms Demand Action was initially founded in Indianapolis, Indiana and, even so, the bill was able to pass despite staunch opposition by the organization.

=== Other issues ===
Everytown has filed amicus curiae briefs in support of New Jersey's high-capacity magazine ban, California's may-issue permitting law, and New York's may-issue permitting law. May-issue permitting was found to be unconstitutional by the Supreme Court in 2022, NYSRPA v. Bruen.

A brief was filed challenging Florida's state preemption law against local firearm ordinances.

In July 2018, the organization sought an injunction to block the distribution of blueprints for 3D printed firearms by Defense Distributed.

The group also advocated for the prohibition of bump stocks following the 2017 Las Vegas Shooting.

== Programs and political activities ==
In April 2008, Walmart — the largest retailer of firearms in the U.S. — voluntarily adopted a number of new sales practices at the behest of Mayors Against Illegal Guns, to "help ensure that guns do not fall into the wrong hands". Senior Vice President J. P. Suarez stated that Walmart signed the 10-point code of the "Responsible Firearms Retailer Partnership" to help the corporation "fine tune the things we're already doing, and further strengthen our standards". He added, "We hope other retailers will join us in adopting the code."

In 2009, Mayors Against Illegal Guns lobbied against the Thune Amendment on concealed firearms, taking out full paper ads in hundreds of newspapers and directly lobbying then Pennsylvania Senator Arlen Specter. The Thune Amendment, often referred to as "Concealed Carry Reciprocity", would have changed federal law to require each U.S. state to recognize permits from all other states. Currently, each state decides which other states' permits they will recognize. The NRA, which supported the amendment, vowed to "score" the vote of legislators. The amendment was defeated 58 to 39, the first time the NRA had lost a vote on the Senate floor in a decade.

After the 2011 Tucson shooting in which Representative Gabby Giffords (D-AZ) was injured, the organization started a petition called "Fix Gun Checks" to require background checks for all gun purchasers, which received 250,000 signatures. The group also released research demonstrating that 18 states had submitted fewer than 100 mental health records to the background check system, and lent its support for the Fix Gun Checks Act, introduced by New York Senator Charles Schumer and Representative Carolyn McCarthy. The group drove a truck on a two-month tour of the country with planned stops in several states to raise awareness about gun violence.

In 2012, the organization worked with retired military leaders to successfully overturn a Congressional amendment prohibiting military commanders and mental health professionals from inquiring about or keeping records of firearms and ammunition in service members' private possession. In April 2013, the organization led efforts to pass legislation in the U.S. Senate to require a background check for all gun sales in commercial settings. Known as the Manchin-Toomey Amendment (Amendment 715 of the 113th Congress), the legislation would have expanded the requirements for conducting background checks to cover all gun sales made over the internet and at gun shows. The amendment ultimately failed to win the 60 votes necessary for passage in the Senate.

After the Senate vote, Mayors Against Illegal Guns ran ads in 13 states either in support of Senators who voted to pass the legislation or in opposition to lawmakers who voted against it. The group spent approximately $12 million on these advertisements. Mayors Against Illegal Guns also ran a bus tour, similar to the bus tour it organized following the shooting of Giffords, entitled "No More Names". The No More Names tour visited 25 states in 100 days to build local support for passing gun violence prevention legislation in Congress. No More Names is a program launched on June 14, 2013 (the six month anniversary of the Sandy Hook Elementary School shooting) with the stated purpose to "pass common-sense laws, including comprehensive background checks, that will reduce gun violence and save lives." The program revolves around a bus tour of twenty-five states in one hundred days starting in Newtown, Connecticut. At each stop "gun violence survivors, mayors, faith leaders, and other community members will read aloud the names of Americans killed with guns since Newtown." This is to encourage members of Congress "to pass common sense gun laws."

MAIG organizers issued an apology after speakers mistakenly included the name of Boston Marathon bombing perpetrator Tamerlan Tsarnaev among a list of shooting victims read aloud at a gun control rally in Concord, New Hampshire—an error noted in the New Hampshire Union Leader and criticized by the New Hampshire Republican Party, amongst others. Further inspection found that the list also contained the names of at least ten murder suspects including former Los Angeles Police Department officer-turned-fugitive Christopher Dorner. In response, the group issued a statement explaining that it used a list compiled by Slate.com as its source.

During the 2014 elections, Everytown endorsed over 100 candidates for office in 28 states. Everytown was active in supporting the passage of Washington State Initiative 594, a successful ballot initiative that changed Washington State law to require background checks for all gun purchases. According to public records, Everytown's expenditures in support of Initiative 594 total over $3.2 million, and was among the top five contributors to the Washington Alliance for Gun Responsibility, the Washington state group formed to support the passage of Initiative 594. Everytown also opposed Washington State Initiative 591, a countermeasure to Initiative 594 supported by gun rights groups. Initiative 594 was approved on November 4, 2014, with 59.3% voting yes and 40.7% voting no. Initiative 591, which appeared on the same ballot, was rejected with 55.3% voting no and 44.7% voting yes. The group also supported the reelection of Colorado Governor John Hickenlooper (D) and Colorado State Senators who supported the 2013 passage of gun violence prevention laws in the state, including a law that requires background checks on all gun sales.

Following on the organization's successful advocacy of Washington State Initiative 594, the group announced plans to support a similar initiative in Nevada. On December 8, 2014, the Nevada initiative qualified to be on that state's 2016 ballot. The initiative passed, but is on hold due to state Attorney General Adam Laxalt's interpretation of the ballot language regarding involvement of the FBI making it unenforceable. On October 4, 2017, the initiative support campaign, Nevadans for Background Checks, filed suit against Laxalt and Governor Brian Sandoval, demanding that they implement the law. Everytown has announced that it will consider ballot initiative campaigns in Arizona, Maine, and Oregon.

In December 2015, the organization teamed up with the National Basketball Association (NBA) to produce a series of ads calling for an end to gun violence, without offering specific policy recommendations. NBA players featured in the ads included Stephen Curry and Carmelo Anthony. The ads first aired on Christmas Day that year.

Everytown, Moms Demand Action, and Students Demand Action sponsored a gun forum for 2020 presidential candidates at The Des Moines Register Political Soapbox on August 10, 2019.

== Organization ==
=== Advisory board ===
Everytown has an advisory board composed of mayors, business and military leaders, and survivors of gun violence. As of January 2014, the organization's advisory board consisted of the following members:

- Art Acevedo — former Chief of Police, Houston, Texas
- Tom Barrett — former mayor of Milwaukee, Wisconsin
- Stephen Barton — Survivor of the 2012 Aurora theater shooting
- Michael R. Bloomberg — Publisher, investor, and former mayor of New York City
- David Boren — Former governor and United States senator from Oklahoma
- Eli Broad — Philanthropist
- Warren Buffett — Investor
- Gloria Chavez — Former mayor of Tijeras, New Mexico
- David Chipman — Former Agent of the Bureau of Alcohol, Tobacco, Firearms, and Explosives
- Michael B. Coleman — Former mayor of Columbus, Ohio
- Carlos A. Giménez — U. S. representative (FL-28), former mayor of Miami-Dade County, Florida
- Roxanna Greene — Mother of Christina Taylor Greene, killed in the 2011 Tucson shooting
- Nick Hanauer — Venture capitalist
- Geoffrey Henry — Mayor of Oxford, Pennsylvania
- Irwin M. Jacobs — Former Chairman of Qualcomm
- Danny Jones — Former mayor of Charleston, West Virginia
- Ken Lerer — Businessman and media executive
- John Mack — Former CEO of Morgan Stanley
- Chris McDonnell — Father of Grace McDonnell, a student killed at the Sandy Hook Elementary School shooting
- Marc Morial — President of the National Urban League, former mayor of New Orleans
- Mike Mullen — Admiral in the U.S. Navy, retired
- Michael Nutter — Former mayor of Philadelphia, Pennsylvania
- Annise Parker — Former mayor of Houston, Texas
- Cleopatra and Nathaniel Pendleton — Mother and father of Hadiya Pendleton, killed by gunfire
- Gilles Rousseau — Father of Lauren Rousseau, a teacher killed at the Sandy Hook school shooting
- Christy Salters Martin — Former professional boxer, a survivor of gun violence
- Shannon Watts — Founder of Moms Demand Action for Gun Sense

=== Mayors Against Illegal Guns ===
MAIG membership consists of "more than 1,000 current and former Mayors." MAIG membership dropped 15%, from 1,046 to 885, between the Sandy Hook Elementary School shooting in December 2012 and a count reported in February 2014. NRA president James W. Porter, said "there's very little political will to take on any of these gun issues." Some mayors said the group had moved from being against illegal guns to simply being against guns. MAIG chairman John Feinblatt said the group has the same principles as before and that the membership drop was "just the natural course of events that mayors leave and join our coalition based on the electoral cycle." However, several founding mayors ended up in prison such as Kwame Kilpatrick, mayor of Detroit.

Meanwhile, in Rockford, Illinois, Mayor Larry Morrissey believed "Mayors Against Illegal Guns" would be a group focused on guns that were illegally possessed by prohibited persons, but instead found the focus of MAIG was to promote legislation that made rifles and magazines illegal.

In 2009, at least four mayors issued public statements in reaffirmation of their membership and praise of the coalition, in response to the NRA's letter-writing campaign. One mayor reaffirmed her membership while stating "Nothing that this organization has lobbied for has been to get rid of guns altogether or to take away people's Second Amendment rights".

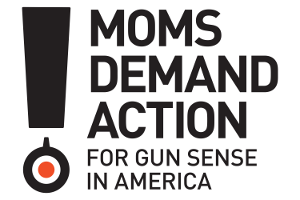
Moms Demand Action logo before its acquisition by Everytown

=== Moms Demand Action For Gun Sense in America ===
Moms Demand Action for Gun Sense in America was founded on December 15, 2012, one day after the Sandy Hook Elementary School shooting. The organization was founded for mothers to advocate for gun ownership prevention as a campaign of the Everytown for Gun Safety Action Fund. The group was founded by Shannon Watts in Indianapolis, Indiana and originally began as a grassroots Facebook group page titled "One Million Moms for Gun Control". By the end of 2013, Moms Demand Action had grown into an advocacy group with 130,000 members and chapters in all 50 states. The group has cited the example of Mothers Against Drunk Driving (MADD) as a model for its establishment. Moms Demand Action has lobbied members of Congress to expand background checks for individuals purchasing guns, and claims to have persuaded Starbucks to ban guns from its coffee shops. Moms Demand Action endorses congressional candidates.

An ad campaign launched by the group compared laws concerning assault weapons with laws that have successfully banned other things in certain areas of the United States, including Kinder Surprise chocolates, certain books, and dodgeball. In December 2013, Moms Demand Action announced that it had merged with Mayors Against Illegal Guns to form Everytown for Gun Safety. As of October 2017, it says it has 4 million members.

In February 2018, in the aftermath of the mass shooting in Parkland, Florida, the group launched a campaign asking companies providing streaming services to remove the NRA's online channel (NRATV) from their offer.

On April 27, 2023, Moms Demand Action announced the appointment of its first executive director, Angela Ferrell-Zabala, who was previously Senior Vice President of Movement Building for Everytown.

=== Students Demand Action For Gun Sense in America ===
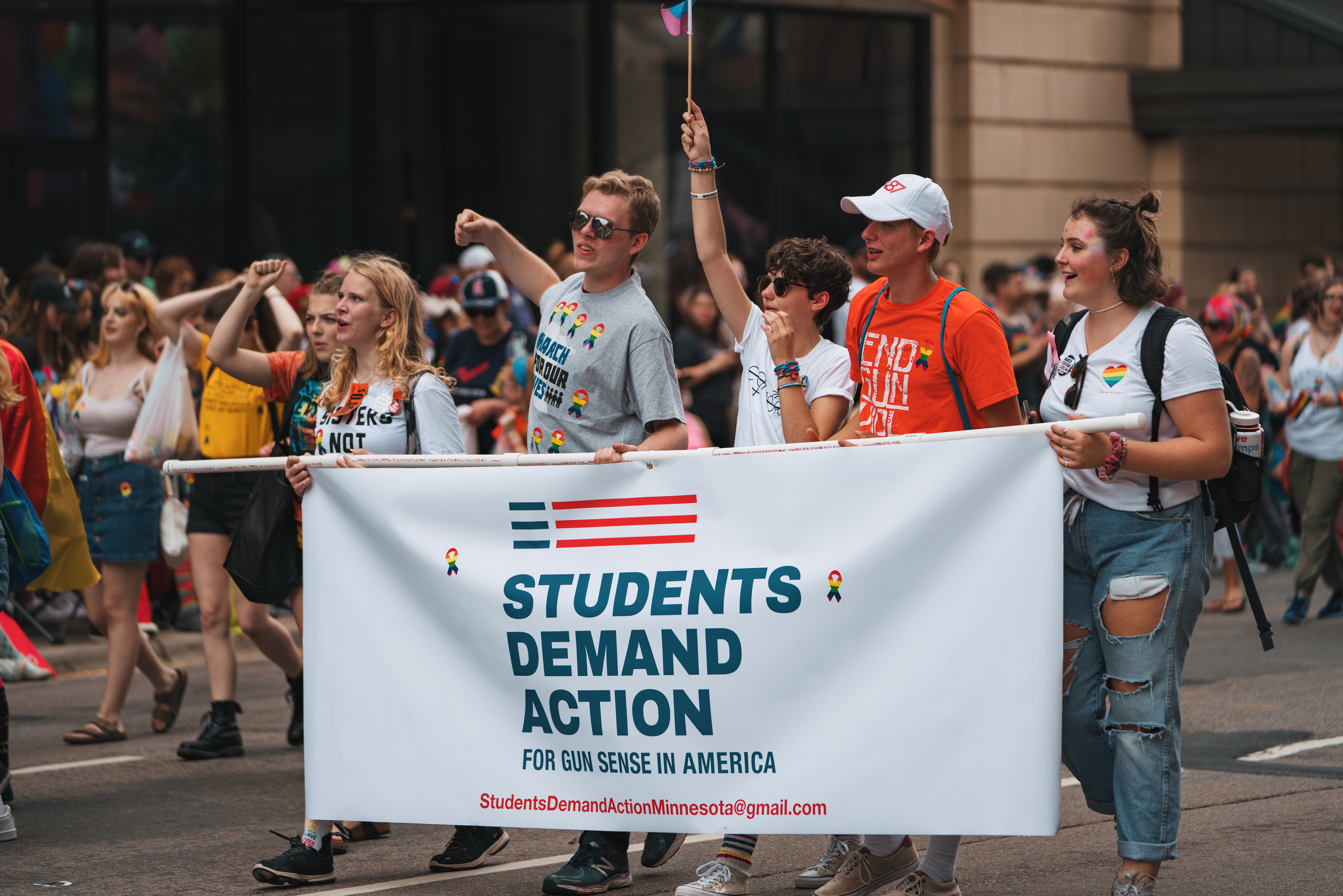
Students Demand Action supporters march at the 2018 Twin Cities Pride Parade in Minneapolis, Minnesota.

Students Demand Action for Gun Sense in America is Everytown's student wing. After the February 2018 mass shooting at Marjory Stoneman-Douglas High School in Parkland Florida, many students implored Everytown for Gun Safety to found a branch dedicated to student activism. In response, Everytown founded the student organization and began accepting applications from students who wanted to found their own chapters of the group in early 2018. Two days after the March for Our Lives rally was held in Washington, D.C., Everytown announced a $1 million grant program would be made available to accelerate already-burgeoning growth. Students Demand Action chapters, in addition to pursuing goals set by student leaders and advisors, work with Everytown for Gun Safety's national office as well as local and state Moms Demand Action chapters to coordinate advocacy. In early 2019, Moms Demand Action hosted legislative advocacy days in coordination with local Students Demand Action chapters in multiple states. According to Everytown, over 900 groups have been founded as of 2025.

== NRA opposition ==
In September 2009, the NRA Institute for Legislative Action (NRA-ILA) stated that Mayors Against Illegal Guns is not "only concerned with 'illegal' guns" but is actually "anti-gun". The NRA encouraged members to ask their mayors to resign from MAIG. In October 2009, NRA spokeswoman Rachel Parsons stated that "the coalition's participating mayors from both large and small cities dropped from 463 to less than 400" as a result of the NRA's letter-writing campaign. Mayor Bloomberg, however, has said that while 60 mayors have left the organization since the NRA's campaign was launched, another 110 mayors have joined.

Some of the NRA's criticism has included attacks on Bloomberg, MAIG's co-founder. In a cover story of their news magazine America's 1st Freedom, the NRA has described Mayor Bloomberg as "a billionaire, Boston-grown evangelist for the nanny state" who leads a "cabal". James O. E. Norell, contributing editor, said Bloomberg is "Beholden to nothing except his own ambitions, the mayor has established himself as a kind of national gun-control vigilante." The cover of the issue, according to The New York Times, depicts Bloomberg as a "giant octopus, looking fierce and slightly insane, with serpentine arms swirling behind him".

The NRA's web site lists 73 mayors that have quit MAIG, including 15 in Pennsylvania, alone.

Mayor Mary Wolf of Williamsport, Pennsylvania, said she resigned "because she thought [MAIG] was attempting to erode all gun ownership, not just illegal guns." John Tkazik, mayor of Poughkeepsie, New York, who is a member of the NRA and a former member of MAIG resigned, saying he and 50 others also resigned because "MAIG became a vehicle for Bloomberg to promote his personal gun-control agenda - Violating the Second Amendment rights of law-abiding citizens ... It did not take long to realize that MAIG's agenda was much more than ridding felons of illegal guns; that under the guise of helping mayors facing a crime and drug epidemic, MAIG intended to promote confiscation of guns from law-abiding citizens.

The NRA has said that MAIG has used mayor's names without permission or were otherwise misidentified.

== Controversy over definition of school shootings ==
Following the Stoneman Douglas High School shooting on February 14, 2018, Everytown stated that the shooting was the 18th school shooting of the year, a statistic The Washington Post called "flat wrong". The instance Everytown counted as the first school shooting of the year regarded a 31-year-old man's suicide in the parking lot of a Michigan school that had been closed for seven months. Another instance regarded a third-grader pressing the trigger on an officer's holstered weapon, where the firearm discharged to the floor. Everytown's basis for a school shooting is defined as "any time a firearm discharges a live round inside a school building or on a school campus or grounds". USA Today reported that the "real number" of school shootings since January 1, 2018, was six. By Time's standards, the number was four.

The group's definition of a "school shooting" was also challenged in 2014 when Everytown claimed there had been 74 school shootings since Sandy Hook. There is no legal definition of a school shooting. Everytown collaborates with Dr. David Riedman, creator of the K-12 School Shooting Database, to systematically record every instance of gunfire on school property.

== See also ==
- March for Our Lives
