= Gun violence =

Method of violence

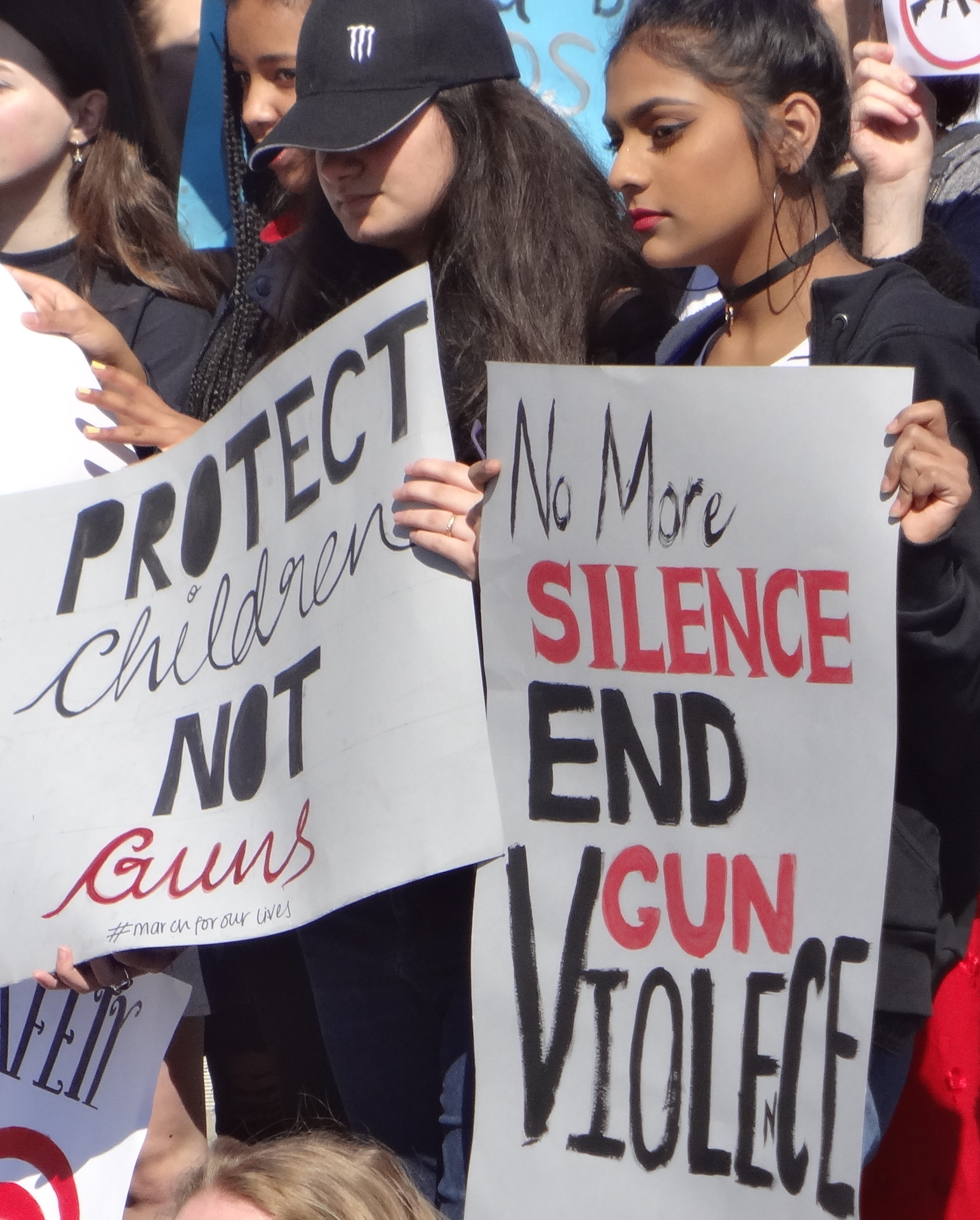
Demonstration against gun violence in Geneva, 2018

Rates of gun-related homicide (red) and suicide (blue) in high-income OECD countries, 2010. Countries in the graph are ordered by total death rates (homicide plus suicide plus other gun-related deaths).

Gun-related violence is violence against a person committed with the use of a firearm to inflict a gunshot wound. Gun violence may or may not be considered criminal. Criminal violence includes homicide (except when and where ruled justifiable) and assault with a deadly weapon. Depending on the jurisdiction, suicide or attempted suicide may also be considered a crime. Non-criminal violence includes accidental injury and death (except in cases of criminal negligence). Also generally included in gun violence statistics are military or para-military activities.

According to GunPolicy.org, in 2006, 75 percent of the world's 875 million guns were civilian-controlled. At the end of 2017 there were approximately 1,013 million firearms in the 230 countries and autonomous territories of the world, 84.6 per cent of which were held by civilians, 13.1 per cent by state militaries, and 2.2 per cent by law enforcement agencies. The 2017 combined global total of 1,013 million firearms is higher than the previously published Small Arms Survey global total of 875 million firearms in 2006, an increase of 15.7 per cent for all identified firearms.

Roughly half of these guns (48 percent) are in the United States, which has the highest rate of gun ownership in the world. Globally, millions are wounded or killed by the use of guns. Assault by firearm resulted in 340,000 deaths in 2025, up from 280,000 deaths in 2023. There were additionally 47,000 unintentional firearm-related deaths in 2013.

Levels of gun-related violence vary greatly among geographical regions, countries, and even sub-nationally. Rates of violent deaths by firearm range from as low as 0.03 and 0.04 per 100,000 population in Singapore and Japan, to 59 and 67 per 100,000 in Honduras and Venezuela. The highest rates of violent deaths by firearm in the world occur in low-income South and Central American countries such as Honduras, Venezuela, Colombia, Guatemala, Brazil and Jamaica.

The United States has the 11th highest rate of gun violence in the world and a gun homicide rate which is 25 times higher than the average respective rates of other high income nations. The United States has a total rate of firearms death which is many times higher than that of similarly developed nations with strict gun control laws, such as Japan, Australia, the United Kingdom, and South Korea. Nearly all studies have found a positive correlation between gun ownership and gun-related homicide and suicide rates.

According to the United Nations, small arms account for roughly half of the weapons used to kill people, and more people die each year from gun-related violence than did in the atomic bombings of Hiroshima and Nagasaki combined. The global death toll from use of guns may be as high as 1,000 dead each day.

== Prevention ==
Firearm guiding policy by country according to the University of Sydney. Permissive Restrictive

A number of ideas have been proposed on how to lessen the incidence of gun-related violence.

Some propose keeping a gun at home to keep oneself safer. Studies show that guns in the home are associated with an increased risk of violent death in the home. According to the Huffington Post, FBI data shows that gun-related violence is linked to gun ownership and is not a function or byproduct of crime. They stated that the FBI data indicates that less than 10% of gun fatalities would be eliminated if they stopped all violent crime, and therefore gun violence is caused by too many guns. Mother Jones reports that "[a] Philadelphia study found that the odds of an assault victim being shot were 4.5 times greater if he carried a gun" and that "[h]is odds of being killed were 4.2 times greater" when armed.

Others propose arming civilians to counter mass shootings. FBI research shows that between 2000 and 2013, "In 5 incidents (3.1%), the shooting ended after armed individuals who were not law enforcement personnel exchanged gunfire with the shooters." Another proposal is to expand self defense laws for cases where a person is being aggressed upon, although "those policies have been linked to a 7 to 10% increase in homicides" (that is, shootings where self-defense cannot be claimed). While the CDC has been studying possible methods of preventing gun violence, they have not come to many conclusions on good gun violence prevention.

Psychiatry is another method seen to help with gun control. It can be used to see the possibility that someone may commit these violent acts. However, it is not a foolproof prevention method that stops gun violence. It is a method that can prevent huge danger warnings from getting access to firearms, but those who have mental illnesses that are not as dangerous, but the people are dangerous, can slip by undetected.

== Types ==
=== Suicide ===
Though substance overdose is the most common method of attempted suicide in the U.S., guns are the most lethal (most likely to result in death).

The US has had the largest number of gun-related suicides in the world every year from 1990 through at least 2019.

There is a strong relationship between guns in the home, as well as access to guns more generally, and suicide risk, the evidence for which is strongest in the United States. In 2017, almost half of the nation's 47,173 suicides involved a firearm. A 1992 case-control study conducted in Tennessee and Washington found that individuals in a firearm owning home are close to five times more likely to commit suicide than those individuals who do not own firearms. A 2002 study found that access to guns in the home was associated with an increased risk of suicide among middle-aged and older adults, even after controlling for psychiatric illness. As of 2008, 12 case-control studies had been conducted in the U.S., all of which had found that guns in the home were associated with an increased risk of suicide. However, a 1996 New Zealand study found no significant relationship between household guns and suicide. Assessing data from 14 developed countries where gun ownership levels were known, the Harvard Injury Control Research Center found statistically significant correlations between those levels and suicide rates. However, the parallels were lost when data from additional nations was included. A 2006 study found a significant effect of changes in gun ownership rates on gun suicide rates in multiple Western countries. During the 1980s and 1990s, the rate of adolescent suicides with guns caught up with adult rates, and the 75-and-older rate rose above all others. A 2002 study found that 90% of suicide attempts with firearms were successful.

The use of firearms in suicides ranges from less than 10 percent in Australia to 50 percent in the United States, where it is the most common method and where suicides outnumber homicides two to one. Those who purchased a firearm were found to be at high risk for suicide within a week of the purchase. The United States has both the highest number of Suicides and Gun ownerships for a developed country and firearms are the most popular method to commit suicide. In the United States when Gun ownerships rise so, too, does suicide by firearm. Suicide can be an impulsive act; 40% of those who survived a suicide attempt said that they only considered suicide up to five minutes before attempting the act. This impulsivity can lead to the use of a firearm as it is seen as a quick and lethal method.

According to U.S. criminologist Gary Kleck, studies that try to link gun ownership to victimology often fail to account for the presence of guns owned by other people. Research by economists John Lott of the U.S. and John Whitley of Australia indicates that safe-storage laws do not appear to affect juvenile accidental gun-related deaths or suicides. In contrast, a 2004 study led by Daniel Webster found that such laws were associated with slight reductions in suicide rates among children. The same study criticized Lott and Whitley's study on the subject for inappropriately using a Tobit model. A committee of the U.S. National Research Council said ecological studies on violence and firearms ownership provide contradictory evidence. The committee wrote: "[Existing] research studies and data include a wealth of descriptive information on homicide, suicide, and firearms, but, because of the limitations of existing data and methods, do not credibly demonstrate a causal relationship between the ownership of firearms and the causes or prevention of criminal violence or suicide."

=== Intentional homicide ===
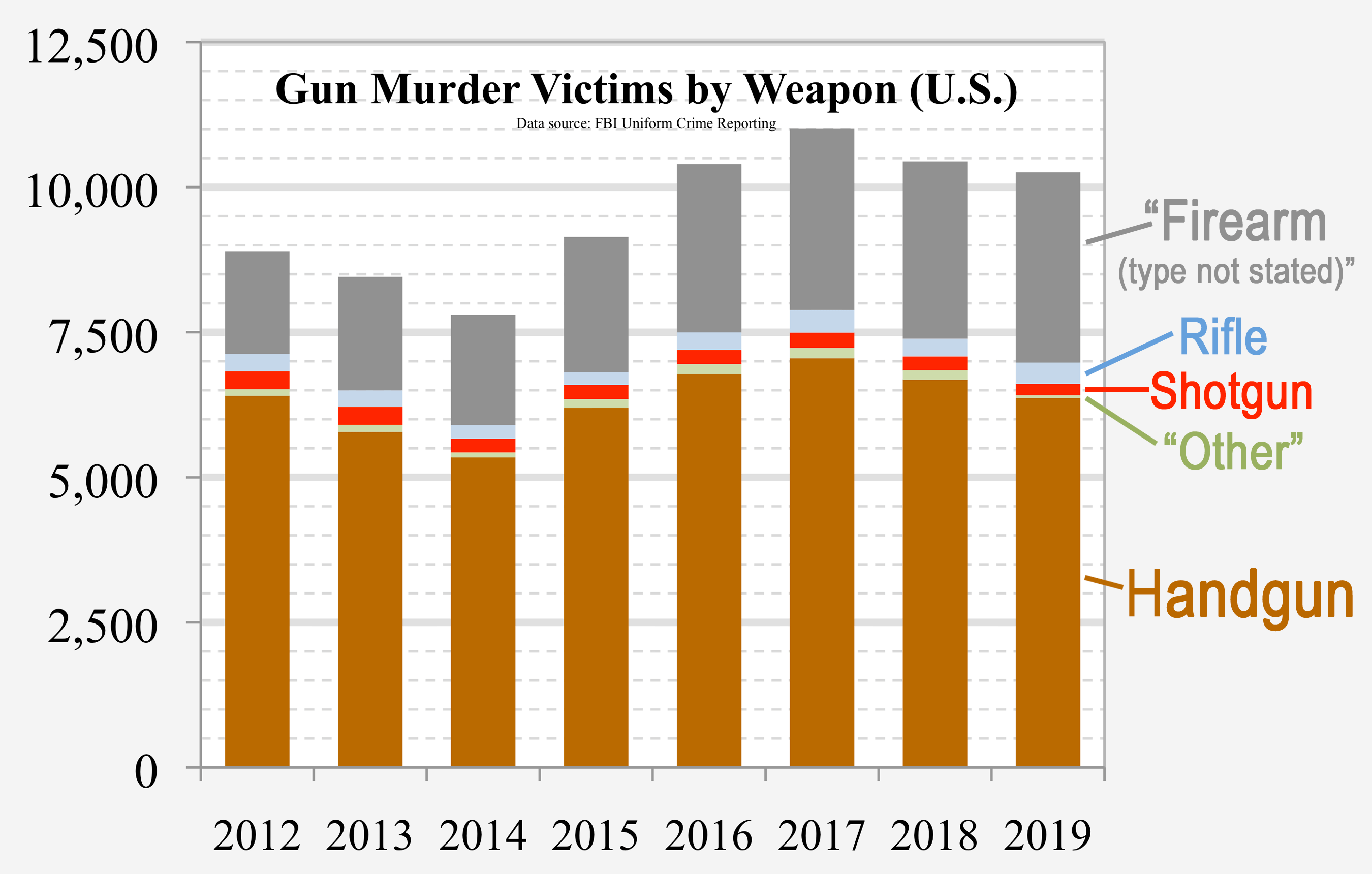
Handguns are involved in most U.S. gun homicides.

The United Nations Office on Drugs and Crime (UNODC) defines intentional homicide as "acts in which the perpetrator intended to cause death or serious injury by his or her actions." This excludes deaths related to conflicts (war); caused by recklessness or negligence; or justifiable, such as in self-defense or by law enforcement in the line of duty. A 2009 report by the Geneva Declaration using UNODC data showed that worldwide firearms were used in an average of 60 percent of all homicides. In the U.S. in 2011, 67 percent of homicide victims were killed by a firearm: 66 percent of single-victim homicides and 79 percent of multiple-victim homicides. In 2009, the United States' homicide rate was reported to be 5.0 per 100,000. A 2016 Harvard study claims that in 2010 the homicide rate was about 7 times higher than that of other high-income countries, and that the US gun homicide rate was 25.2 times higher.

Critics of Kellermann's study say that it is more directly a study of domestic violence than of gun ownership. Gary Kleck and others dispute the work. Kleck says that few of the homicides that Kellermann studied were committed with guns belonging to the victim or members of their household, and that it was implausible that victim household gun ownership contributed to their homicide. Instead, according to Kleck, the association that Kellermann found between gun ownership and victimization reflected that people who live in more dangerous circumstances are more likely to be murdered, but also were more likely to have acquired guns for self-protection.

In studies of nonfatal gun use, it was found that guns can contribute to coercive control, which can then escalate into chronic and more severe violence. Guns can negatively impact victims even without being discharged. Threats of gun use or showing a weapon can create damaging and long-lasting fear and emotional stress in victims because they are aware of the danger of having an abuser who has access to a gun.

=== Robbery and assault ===
The United Nations Office on Drugs and Crime defines robbery as the theft of property by force or threat of force. Assault is defined as a physical attack against the body of another person resulting in serious bodily injury. In the case of gun-related violence, the definitions become more specific and include only robbery and assault committed with the use of a firearm. Firearms are used in this threatening capacity four to six times more than firearms used as a means of protection in fighting crime. Hemenway's figures are disputed by other academics, who assert there are many more defensive uses of firearms than criminal uses.

In terms of occurrence, developed countries have similar rates of assaults and robberies with firearms, whereas the rates of homicides by firearms vary greatly by country.

=== Accidental ===
From 1979 to 1997, almost 30,000 people in the United States alone died from accidental firearm injuries. A disproportionately high number of these deaths occurred in parts of the United States where firearms are more prevalent. Following the Sandy Hook Elementary School Shooting, accidental firearm deaths increased by about five hundred percent until April 2013.

== Causes ==
Multiple studies show that where people have easy access to firearms, gun-related deaths tend to be more frequent, including by suicide, homicide and unintentional injuries.

Gun violence has many different psychological and external causes that can be attributed to it.

=== Psychological ===
While only about 1 percent of court cases relating to gun violence end in "not guilty by insanity", about 28 percent of people who commit gun violence are found to have some form of mental illness. From Centers of Disease Control and Prevention's report regarding national mental health survey, about 1 in 5 Americans experience mental illness in a given year, and 1 in 25 Americans lives under severe mental health problem, such as schizophrenia, bipolar disorder, or major depression. However, mental illness is not the major cause of gun violence. According to statistics, the United States, with similar rate of mental illness to other high-income countries, has relatively higher rate of firearm homicide, which is approximately 25 times higher; firearm suicide is also 10 times higher than other high-income countries. Even though there are about 14 million people with serious mental illness in the United States, they only take up a small portion of the perpetrator of mass shootings in the nation. Only about 5% of shootings are by a perpetrator with severe mental illness. However, about 25% of shootings are related to non-psychotic illness and instead something more prevalent such as depression. Substance abuse accounts as a factor for 23% of shootings. According to experts other factors that are worth monitoring besides individuals with mental illness that make them prone to violence, are risk factors such as repeated legal troubles, challenges coping with severe life stressors, and the epidemic among young men of a combination of emptiness, anger, nihilism, and need for notoriety. Moreover, by eliminating mental illness, the nation's rate of violence would be decreased only by 3%.

=== External ===
External causes that create gun violence are much more prevalent than mental illnesses, as many of them create "heat of the moment" killings, which make up almost 85% of all gun violence acts. These causes, which tend to be created by other people, such as friends, relatives, acquaintances, and enemies, are much more likely to occur than a random spur-of-the-moment killing. Loner gunmen also have some external motivations as well, as a lack of a social circle may have left them resentful and angry and likely to become dangerous to those around them.

== Costs ==
Violence committed with guns leads to significant public health, psychological, and economic costs.

=== Economic ===
Inpatient hospitalizations for firearms injury account for an estimated $2.8 billion in health-care spending annually and billions more in lost work and wages, with a 2017 study finding that the average gunshot patient incurred hospital costs of more than $95,000. Though gun-related injury rates are less closely tracked than gun-related death rates, state-by-state gun ownership rates were found not to be closely correlated with gun hospitalizations, but gun-related hospitalizations were found to be closely correlated with rates of violent crime overall and with poverty rates.

The economic cost of gun-related violence in the United States is $229 billion a year, meaning a single murder has average direct costs of almost $450,000, from the police and ambulance at the scene, to the hospital, courts, and prison for the murderer. A 2014 study found that from 2006 to 2010, gun-related injuries in the United States cost $88 billion.

=== Public health ===
Assault by firearm resulted in 180,000 deaths worldwide in 2013, up from 128,000 deaths worldwide in 1990. There were 47,000 unintentional firearm deaths worldwide in 2013.

Emergency medical care is a major contributor to the monetary costs of such violence. It was determined in a study that for every firearm death in the United States for the year beginning 1 June 1992, an average of three firearm-related injuries were treated in hospital emergency departments.

=== Psychological ===
Children exposed to gun-related violence, whether they are victims, perpetrators, or witnesses, can experience negative psychological effects over the short and long terms. Psychological trauma also is common among children who are exposed to high levels of violence in their communities or through the media. Psychologist James Garbarino, who studies children in the U.S. and internationally, found that individuals who experience violence are prone to mental and other health problems, such as post-traumatic stress disorder and sleep deprivation. These problems increase for those who experience violence as children. It is conceivable that over a longer period, physical and emotional sequelae of mass shootings may lead to an array of symptoms and disability among affected individuals and communities who will likely experience lifelong consequences by carrying long-term memories of devastation, violence, injuries, and deaths.

Community and Social Decay

Localized gun violence drives business and investment flight, lowers property values, fosters community fear, and fuels intergenerational cycles of violence and poverty. The Rockefeller Institute of Government identifies community gun violence as a primary driver of rising national firearm violence, disproportionately impacting historically underserved urban neighbourhoods and Black and Latinx residents. The analysis emphasises that more than 25 per cent of U.S. gun homicides occur in neighbourhoods housing less than 2 per cent of the nation's population, a disparity that intensified during the COVID-19 pandemic with a 35 per cent spike in firearm homicides. To address these systemic psychological and economic scars, the report advocates for trauma-informed public health and community violence interruption strategies rather than relying solely on standard law enforcement frameworks.

== By country ==
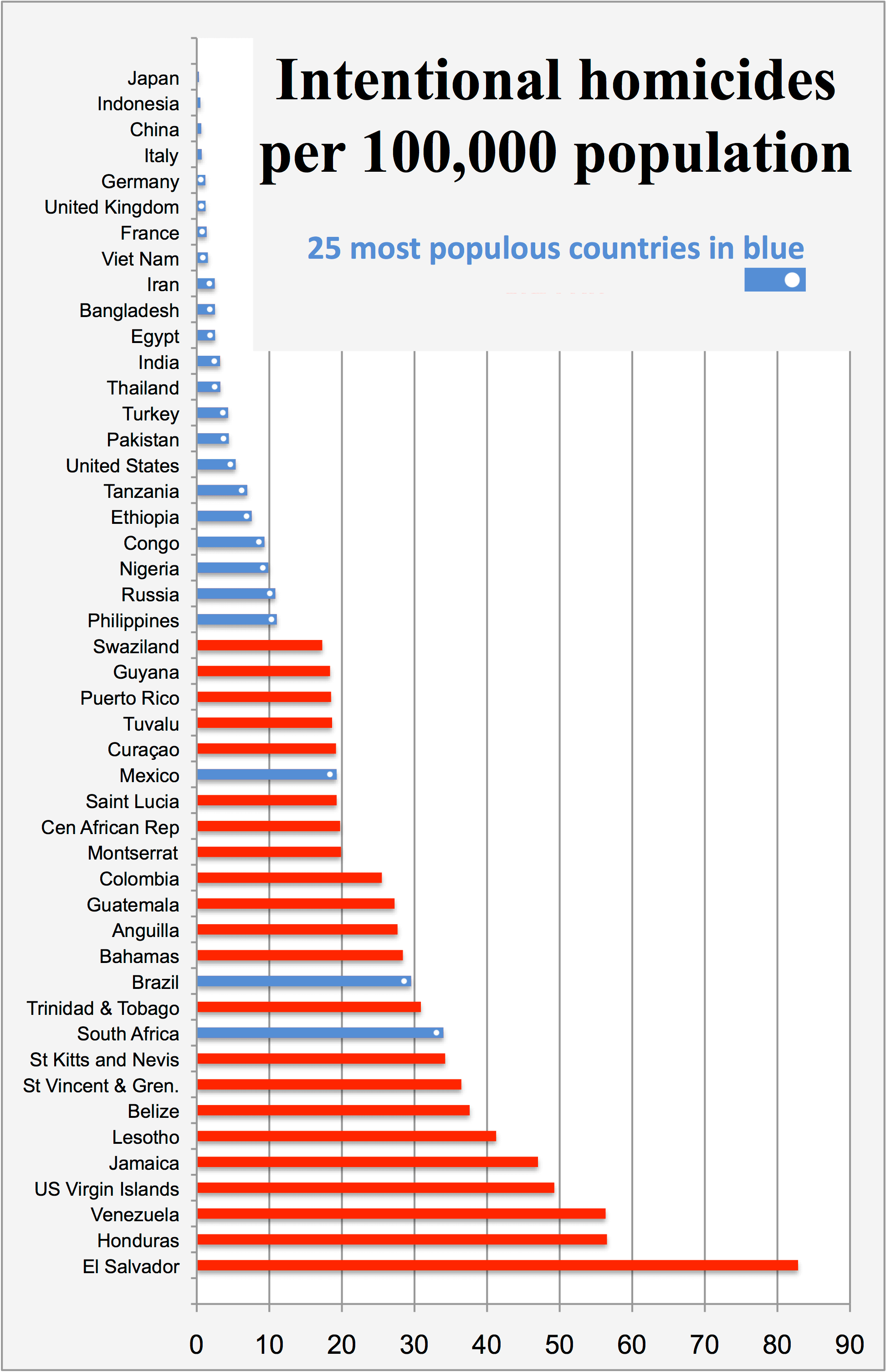
The 25 countries with the highest intentional homicide rates are generally less populous. Rates of the 25 most populous countries are shown in blue.

=== Australia ===
==== Port Arthur ====
The Port Arthur massacre of 1996 horrified the Australian public. The gunman opened fire on shop owners and tourists, killing 35 people and wounding 23. This massacre sparked new efforts to enforce Australia's laws against guns. The Prime Minister at that time, John Howard, proposed a gun law that prevented the public from having all semi-automatic rifles and all semi-automatic and pump-action shotguns, in addition to a tightly restrictive system of licensing and ownership controls.

The government also bought back guns from people. In 1996–2003 it was estimated they bought back and destroyed nearly 1 million firearms. By the end of 1996, whilst Australia was still reeling from the Port Arthur massacre, the gun law was fully in place. Since then, the number of deaths related to gun-related violence dwindled almost every year. In 1979, 685 people died due to gun violence, and in 1996 it was 516. The numbers continue to drop; however, they were declining also before the gun law was in place.

==== Sydney Siege ====
Australia's most mediated gun violence-related incident since Port Arthur was the 2014 Sydney Hostage Crisis. On 15–16 December 2014, a lone gunman, Man Haron Monis, held hostage 17 customers and employees of a Lindt chocolate café. The perpetrator was on bail at the time, and had previously been convicted of a range of offences.

The following year in August, the New South Wales Government tightened the laws of bail and illegal firearms, creating a new offence for the possession of a stolen firearm, with a maximum of 14 years imprisonment.

==== 2025 Bondi Beach Shooting ====
On 14 December 2025, an antisemitic Islamic State (IS)-inspired terrorist attack occurred at the Archer Park area of Bondi Beach in Sydney, Australia, during a celebration of the Jewish holiday of Hanukkah attended by around 1,000 people.

Beginning at 6:42 pm, two gunmen, allegedly Sajid Akram and his son Naveed Akram, killed a total of 15 people including 11 men, 3 women and a 10-year-old girl.

Three firearms were used during the attack, and a fourth was located at the scene. Sajid (an Indian national and Australian permanent resident) was shot dead by police; his son Naveed (an Australian citizen) was treated for wounds at a local hospital and survived. Islamic State later claimed credit for the attack.

Sajid had a firearms licence, was the registered owner of six guns, and was a member of a shooting club, Zastava Hunting Association. Naveed had trained at the same shooting club. The firearms used during the attack are believed to be a Beretta BRX1 .308 straight-pull rifle and two Stoeger M3000 M3K 12-gauge straight-pull shotguns. These weapons were imported to Australia to bypass restrictions on pump actions, as they are capable of a rate of fire which is not greatly inferior to the banned weapons.

=== Sweden ===
Gun violence in Sweden (Swedish: skjutningar or gängskjutningar) increased steeply among males aged 15 to 29 in the two decades before 2018, in addition to a rising trend in gun violence there was also a high rate of gun violence in Sweden compared to other countries in Western Europe. By 2021, gun violence by organized crime had increased tenfold since the early 1990s.

According to a report published by academic researchers in 2017, shooting incidents with fatal outcomes are about 4 to 5 times as common in Sweden compared to neighbouring countries such as Germany and Norway when taking population size into account. The city with the highest prevalence of shootings was Malmö. The grave violence in the studied period also changed character, from criminal motorcycle gangs to city suburbs. Sweden also stands out in having a low resolution rate (25%) for gun homicides compared to Germany and Finland at 90%.

In January 2018, police statistics reported an increase in gun homicides from 8 in 2006 to 43 in 2017. Analysis of 2011–2017 gang warfare showed that there were 1500 incidents involving firearms, 131 people had been killed and 520 injured.

In February 2018, criminologist Jerzy Sarnecki stated in an interview with magazine Forskning & Framsteg that the increasing levels of gun crime in Sweden had taken him, Swedish criminologists in general and police in Sweden by surprise. He characterised the recent developments as "very serious".

A 2018 systematic review of 25 studies on firearm violence in Sweden by criminologist and physician Ardavan Khoshnood, concluded "that even though knives/sharp weapons continue to be the most common MO in a violent crime in Sweden, firearm-related violence is significantly increasing in the country and foremost when discussing gang-related crimes. Moreover, firearm-related homicides and attempted homicides are increasing in the country. The studies also show that a firearm is much more lethal than a knife/sharp weapon... It is principally the three largest cities of Sweden which are affected by the many shootings in recent years."

According to researcher Amir Rostami at Stockholm University, police statistics for January–November 2018 showed that the number of shootings was at a continued high rate at 274, where up until the end of November 42 people had been shot and killed and 129 wounded compared to 43 in 2017.

In 2020, there were 366 incidents of shootings in Sweden where 47 people were killed and 117 were wounded, which represented a 10% increase on the previous year. About half the shooting resulting in killings took place in so-called vulnerable areas and represented an increase on the preceding year.

In 2021, Sweden was found to have the 2nd highest gun homicide rate (after Croatia) out of 22 European countries surveyed. Most other countries surveyed had instead experienced a decline in gun homicides.

According to researcher Amir Rostami in 2021, those responsible for the gun violence are predominantly young men and often second generation immigrants.

By 2023, gun violence in Sweden had risen to 2.5 times the European average. Most of the violence continued to be attributable to an influx of guns, drug dealing, and marginalized immigrant communities.

==== Innocent bystanders ====
According to police in 2018, at least nine people who were innocent bystanders had been killed in cross-fire incidents in the last few years and the risk to the public was therefore rising.

In 2017, Minister for Justice Morgan Johansson stated in an interview that the risk to "innocent people" was small.

In the 2011–2020 period, 46 bystanders had been killed or wounded in 36 shooting incidents. Of these, 8 were under the age of 15. According to researcher Joakim Sturup, a contributing factor could be the increased use of automatic firearms.

=== Turkey ===
In 2009, more than 1,100 were killed.

In 2012, a Turkish parliament document stated that 85% of the guns in the country were unregistered.

In 2013, more than 1,800 people were killed.

In 2015, more than 1,900 people were killed and 1,200 people were injured from guns.

In 2017, more than 2,100 people were killed and 3,500 people were injured.

In 2018, more than 2,200 people were killed and more than 3,700 were injured. The five places with the most incidents were Istanbul, Ankara, Samsun, Adana and Sakarya.

In 2020, more than 2,000 people were killed and more than 3,600 were injured, although there were curfews in the country due to the COVID-19 pandemic. The five cities with the most incidents were Istanbul, Samsun, Adana, İzmir and Bursa. The chairman of the Umut Foundation NGO said that there were 18 million unregistered guns which is 89% of the guns in the country.

In 2021, more than 2,140 people were killed and 3,896 were severely wounded in gun violence incidents in the country.

=== United Kingdom ===
In the year ending 31 March 2025, the UK police recorded a total of 5,103 firearm offences (not including air weapons such as air rifles). That was a decrease of 21% on the previous year. A total of 32 homicides were committed by shooting in that year, which equates to 6% of all homicides.

=== United States ===
Gun-related suicides and homicides in the United States

U.S. gun sales have risen in the 21st century, peaking in 2020 during the COVID-19 pandemic. "NICS" is the FBI's National Instant Background Check System.

Gun-related death rates are positively correlated with household gun ownership rates.

The U.S. accounts for 97% of gun-related child deaths among similar countries, despite making up only 46% of this group's overall population.

A The New York Times study reported how outcomes of active shooter attacks varied with actions of the attacker, the police (42% of total incidents), and bystanders (including a "good guy with a gun" outcome in 5.1% of total incidents).

The U.S. has substantially more mass shootings (in which four or more people are killed) than other developed countries.

Gun violence in the United States results in tens of thousands of deaths and injuries annually. In 2013, there were 73,505 nonfatal firearm injuries (23.2 injuries per 100,000 U.S. citizens), and 33,636 deaths due to "injury by firearms" (10.6 deaths per 100,000 U.S. citizens). These deaths consisted of 11,208 homicides, 21,175 suicides, 505 deaths due to accidental or negligent discharge of a firearm, and 281 deaths due to firearms use with "undetermined intent". Of the 2,596,993 total deaths in the US in 2013, 1.3% were related to firearms. The ownership and control of guns are among the most widely debated issues in the country.

In 2010, 67% of all homicides in the U.S. were committed using a firearm. In 2012, there were 8,855 total firearm-related homicides in the US, with 6,371 of those attributed to handguns. In 2012, 64% of all gun-related deaths in the U.S. were suicides. In 2010, there were 19,392 firearm-related suicides, and 11,078 firearm-related homicides in the U.S. In 2010, 358 murders were reported involving a rifle while 6,009 were reported involving a handgun; another 1,939 were reported with an unspecified type of firearm.

Firearms were used to kill 13,286 people in the U.S. in 2015, excluding suicide. Approximately 1.4 million people have been killed using firearms in the U.S. between 1968 and 2011, equivalent to a top 10th largest U.S. city in 2016, falling between the populations of San Antonio and Dallas, Texas.

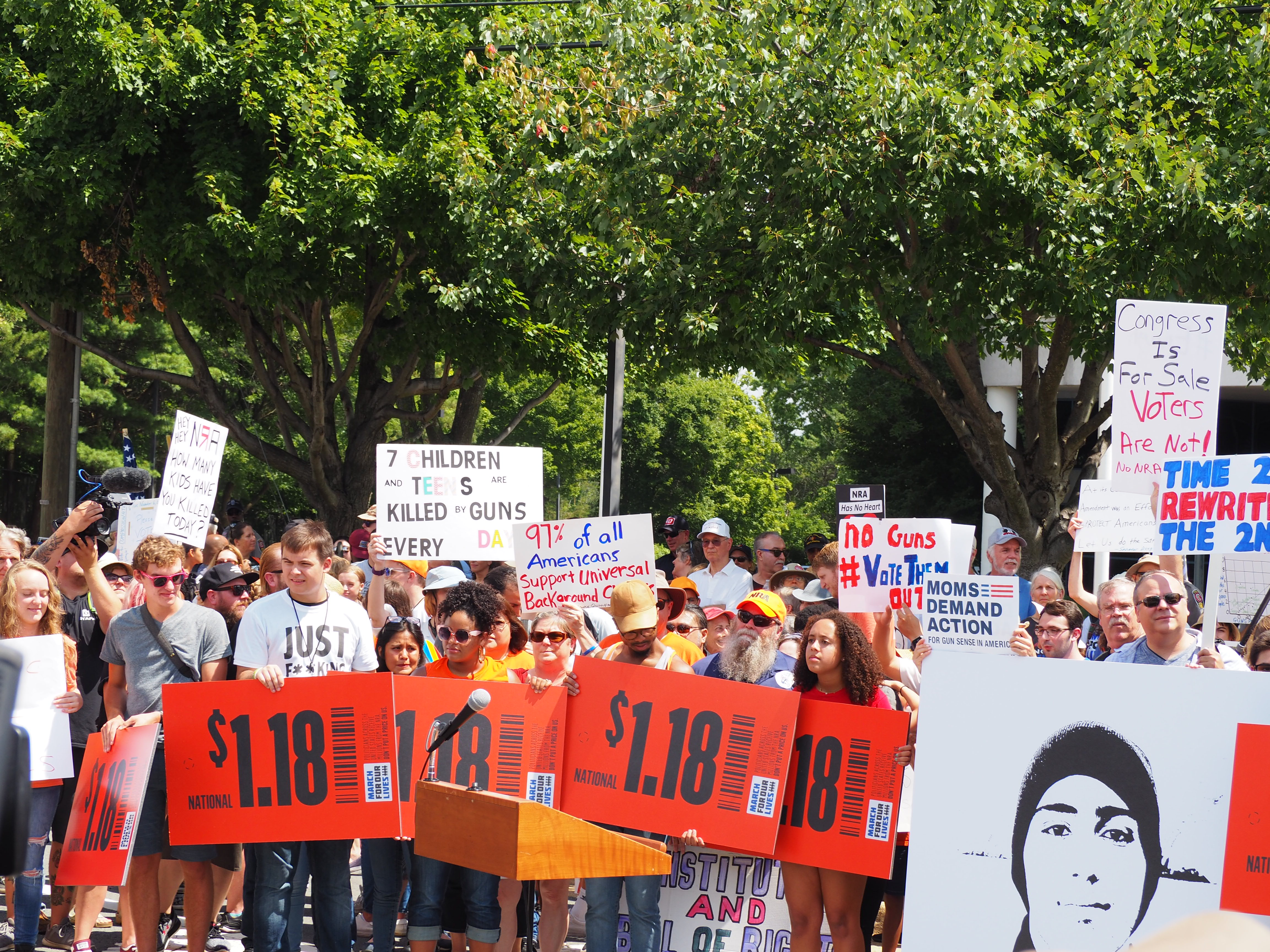
The "National March on the NRA" in August 2018

Compared to 22 other high-income nations, the U.S. gun-related murder rate is 25 times higher. Although it has half the population of the other 22 nations combined, the U.S. had 82 percent of all gun deaths, 90 percent of all women killed with guns, 91 percent of children under 14 and 92 percent of young people between ages 15 and 24 killed with guns. In 2010, gun violence cost U.S. taxpayers approximately $516 million in direct hospital costs.

Gun violence is most common in poor urban areas and frequently associated with gang violence, often involving male juveniles or young adult males. Although mass shootings have been covered extensively in the media, mass shootings in the US account for a small fraction of gun-related deaths and the frequency of these events steadily declined between 1994 and 2007, rising between 2007 and 2013.

Legislation at the federal, state, and local levels has attempted to address gun violence through a variety of methods, including restricting firearms purchases by youths and other "at-risk" populations, setting waiting periods for firearm purchases, establishing gun buyback programs, law enforcement and policing strategies, stiff sentencing of gun law violators, education programs for parents and children, and community-outreach programs. Despite widespread concern about the impacts of gun violence on public health, Congress has prohibited the Centers for Disease Control (CDC) from conducting research that advocates in favor of gun control. The CDC has interpreted this ban to extend to all research on gun violence prevention, and so has not funded any research on this subject since 1996. However the 'Dickey' amendment only restricts the CDC from advocating for gun control with government funds. It does not restrict research into gun violence and the causal links between the gun and the violence; however funding has not yet been granted for that purpose, i.e. epidemiology. The CDC requires congressional approval to proceed.

As of 2020, firearms have become the leading cause of death among children in the U.S. According to statistics, 4368 children and adolescents up to age 19 died from gun violence in the year of 2020. On the everyday average, 12 children die from gun violence, and 100 people killed by guns in the United States. Two-thirds of the death from gun violence is homicide. Moreover, there are more Black children that have been killed in mass shooting than white children, which is four times more.

Approximately nine million children ages 5 to 17 across the United States live in a neighbourhood where a fatal shooting had taken place each year between 2015 and 2019. As with gun homicides in general, Black and Latinx children were significantly more likely to be exposed to gun violence in their community than white children. The pandemic increased exposure numbers to 11,121,000 in 2020, translating to approximately one in five children between the ages of 5 and 17 being exposed to neighbourhood gun violence within the United States during that year.

Prepandemic exposure was lowest among White children and highest among Black children, who experienced 4.44 times more neighborhood firearm violence exposure (95% CI=4.33, 4.56, p<0.001) than White children. The pandemic increased exposure by 27% in the lowest risk group (i.e., White children; 95% CI=20%, 34%, p<0.001), but pandemic effects were even greater for children in nearly all non-White categories. Baseline violence levels and racial disparities varied considerably by region, with the highest levels in the South and the largest magnitude disparities observed in the Northeast and Midwest.

==== Correlation between increased gun safety and decreased gun violence ====
A 2023 study concluded that more restrictive state gun policies reduced homicide and suicide gun deaths. From 1991 to 2016—when most states implemented more restrictive gun laws—gun deaths fell sharply.

An article released from The Brink, Pioneering Research from Boston University, addresses the correlation between increased availability of gun safety and its inverse relationship to gun violence, leading to gun violence's decrease in areas with greater gun safety. The article states: "Legislation at the federal, state, and local levels has attempted to address gun violence through a variety of methods, including restricting firearms purchases by youths and other 'at-risk' populations." Youth who have easy access to firearms are at a high risk to engage in aggressive behaviors as well as to become perpetrators of violence themselves. Additionally, children who experience bullying are more likely to access guns. In a study, youth who reported mental distress were discovered to have a 68% higher chance of hurting others on school grounds compared to youth who did not experience mental distress.

==== Sandy Hook Elementary School shooting ====
On December 14, 2012, Adam Lanza shot and killed his mother at her home and then drove to Sandy Hook Elementary School, where he killed 20 children and six adult staff. Lanza committed suicide as police arrived at the school. Lanza had severe mental health issues which were not adequately treated. The event reignited a debate regarding access to firearms by people with mental illness and gun laws in the United States. It also created a new perspective about how violence in the entertainment industry affects the development of youth. The shooter was known to play violent video games, such as "Call of Duty". Some say that the violent video games "desensitized" him to killing and death

==== Robb Elementary School shooting ====
On May 24, 2022, Salvador Rolando Ramos shot (but failed to kill) his grandmother and then entered Robb Elementary School in Uvalde, Texas, through a door that was not properly closed. After entering the school, Salvador Rolando Ramos fired over 100 rounds, which resulted in the death of 19 students and 2 teachers. An 11-year-old girl survived by playing dead when she smeared herself with others' blood. Moreover, before Salvador Rolando Ramos killed one of the teachers, "Good night," he said indifferently. Two days after the mass shooting, Joe, the husband of a teacher named Garcia killed during the shooting, died due to a heart attack. This mass shooting had again drawn the government's and society's attention toward gun violence and control. There are debates raised after the mass shooting regarding gun control, which the public urged the government to release more gun control laws and reinforce the background checks.

== See also ==
- Armed violence reduction
- List of countries by firearm-related death rate
- Gunfire locator
- Gun control
- Gunshot wound
- Gun violence in the United States
- Gun violence in U.S. schools
