= Eddie Eagle =

Program and character developed by the National Rifle Association of America

The cover art for the Eddie Eagle Kids' Activity Booklet, Pre-K and Kindergarten edition.

The Eddie Eagle GunSafe program and its namesake character were developed in 1988 by the National Rifle Association of America for children who are generally considered too young to be allowed to handle firearms. The Eddie Eagle program is intended for children of any age from pre-school through fourth grade.

The programme has been criticized as a lobbying tool used to reframe the discussion on firearms in domestic settings, placing the focus on children. It has been presented as an alternative to the safe storage and security of firearms.

== Effectiveness ==
In 2001, pediatrician Geoffrey Jackman observed that although the Eddie Eagle program "has been promoted heavily, it never has been evaluated formally to prove that it works. If gun safety education gives parents a sense of complacency without fundamentally altering child behavior, then it might do more harm than good."

The NRA reports several examples of program successes in which children who were in live situations where a gun was found lying around did exactly as the program instructed them to. The NRA states that a decline in accidental gun deaths since the 1980s is due to the program, a claim contested by several gun-safety researchers.

In contrast, a 2002 study conducted by North Dakota State University concluded the program was not effective at keeping children safe. The study aimed to evaluate the effectiveness of gun training programs on preschool children. It examined the three main targets of the program: teaching children a safety message; how to react to a firearm in a controlled setting; and how to react in a real-world situation. The study found that although the Eddie Eagle program was effective at teaching children the safety message (5 out of 11), only 1 out of 11 was able to react correctly to the role play situation, and none of the students were able to react properly in a real-life situation.

== Training program ==
The program, administered in schools by trained law enforcement officers assisted by a volunteer, teaches children a litany to follow should they encounter a firearm: "Stop! Don't touch! Leave the area! Tell an adult!" Instructional materials, including workbooks and videos, can be downloaded at no cost via the Eddie Eagle webpage.

The NRA encourages parents and other adults to reach out to schools and inform them of the availability of the program. The NRA provides classroom materials for schools and other non-profit institutions free of charge.

== Origins and impact ==
Marion Hammer, at the time a lobbyist for the NRA, developed this program in 1988. According to the NRA, "with a firearm present in about half of all American households, young children should learn that firearms are not toys." Hammer won a National Safety Council's Outstanding Community Service Award in 1993 for her work on the program.

In 2004, New York Times "Personal Health" columnist Jane Brody wrote that the NRA underwrote the Eddie Eagle GunSafe Program "in part hoping to avert more stringent gun control laws."

As of 1997, the NRA says it reached 10 million children, and by 2015, it said that the number had grown to 28 million. The program has been mandated for schools in North Carolina and Oregon, and is used in individual school districts across the country.

In 2015, the program was revamped by Tulsa, Oklahoma, advertising agency Ackerman McQueen. The agency has won several local ADDY Awards for its work on the campaign.

== Media coverage ==
In 1999, the ABC News program 20/20 did a feature on Eddie Eagle which was highly critical of the program. This feature stated that it did not work to simply "Tell [very young] kids what to do" and expect them to follow those instructions implicitly. The producers had a group of schoolchildren (aged 3 to 10 years old) watch the Eddie Eagle video along with a presentation by a police officer on gun safety. While the children all appeared to understand the message that guns are not toys, when the children were left alone with prop guns (and a hidden camera capturing their reactions), they all proceeded to use them as if they were toys. 20/20 collaborated with Hardy to recreate her 2002 study featured aired in 2014 reporting results similar to the 1999 feature.

Samantha Bee on her show Full Frontal with Samantha Bee, in a segment accusing the NRA of hypocrisy, contrasted an unsuccessful attempt to acquire an Eddie Eagle costume, noting an 18-page application and 20 day review period, while successfully purchasing several firearms without a background check. In response to the segment the NRA's Institute for Legislative Action noted that the Eddie Eagle mascot is trademarked, to be used "ONLY for the purpose of firearm accident prevention" and subject to private property rights vs. 2nd Amendment rights.

== Criticism ==
Some parents have objected to the program because it assumes there will be guns lying around. Others directed criticism towards its apparent depiction of guns as something people are relatively comfortable having in common places, or that it contradicts their own teachings.

It has been described as a Trojan Horse programme, designed "as a way to deter lawmakers from passing Child Access Prevention (CAP) Laws, which criminalize keeping firearms easily within reach of children".

Advocates of safe storage laws intended to protect children from unsupervised access to firearms, such as the proposed "MaKayla's Law" in Tennessee, complain that the NRA opposes their efforts and promotes Eddie Eagle instead. An early childhood education specialist who helped revamp the Eddie Eagle program in 2015, denies that it should be treated as a replacement for safe storage laws, "No one ever told me that's how the program was going to be used. If they had, I assure you I wouldn't have had anything to do with it. That's giving way too much significance to the lesson." Despite this, the NRA has presented Eddie Eagle as an alternative solution when campaigning against secure storage requirements.

The Economist says that the program treats children as the problem rather than guns. It says the NRA sends a mixed message, noting that the organization encourages gun use by children as young as seven or eight years old in its magazine InSights.

The American Academy of Pediatrics has maintained a critical position on the program since 1992 noting a lack of evidence demonstrating efficacy and advocating an absence of guns from children's homes as a more effective alternative.

The gun control advocacy organizations Brady Campaign to Prevent Gun Violence and Violence Policy Center are critical of the program and its efficacy.
