= John Feinblatt =

President of Everytown for Gun Safety

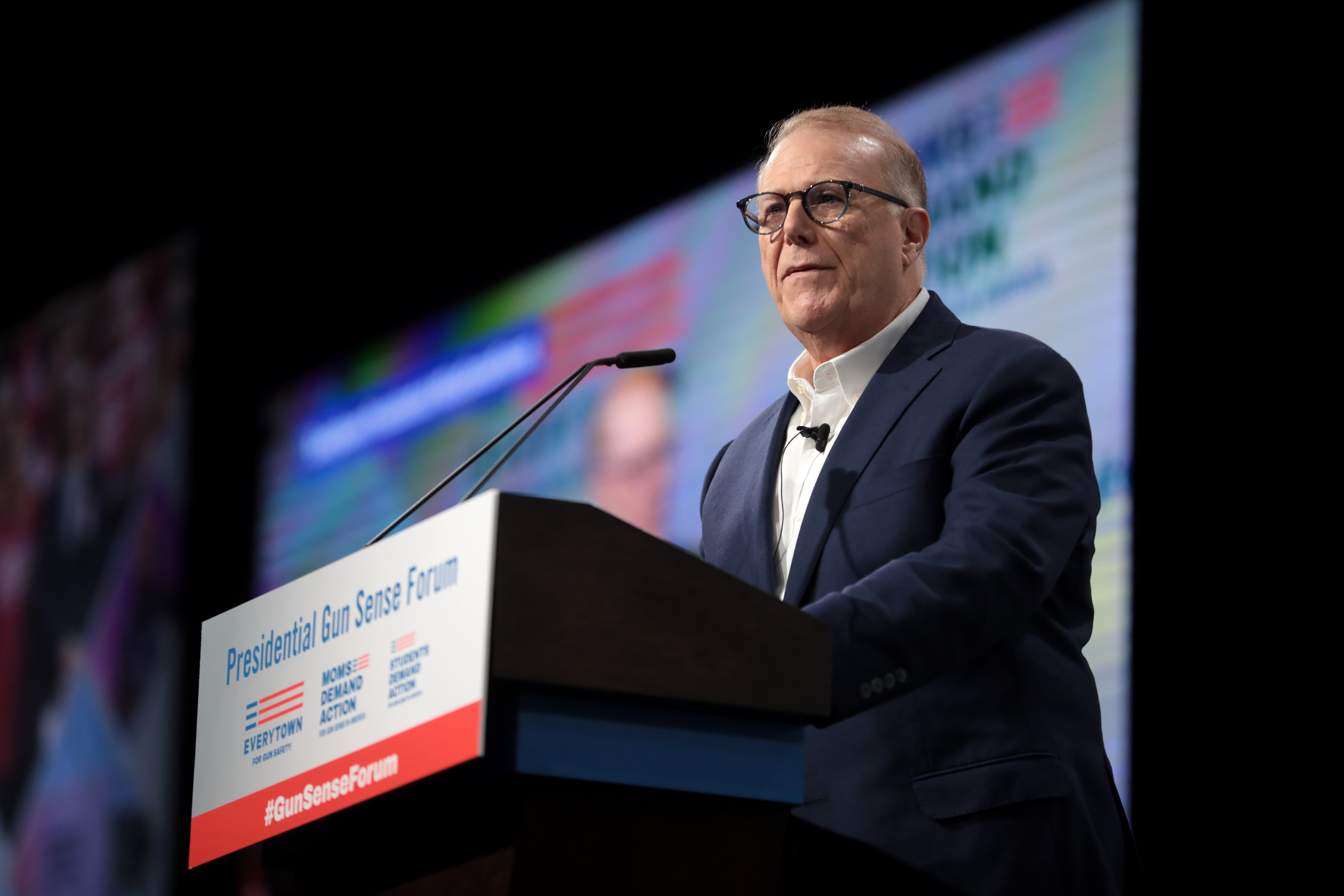
- Born: New York, U.S.
- Education: Wesleyan University; Catholic University of America
- Occupations: Gun control activist Lawyer; Author
- Notable work: Good Courts: The Case for Problem-Solving Justice (2005)

John Feinblatt is an American gun control activist, lawyer, and author. He is the president of both Everytown for Gun Safety, a U.S. gun-violence prevention organization, and The Trace, a media outlet funded by Everytown.

== Early life and education ==
Feinblatt was raised in Baltimore. He holds a degree from Wesleyan University in Middletown, Connecticut, and earned his Juris Doctor degree from the Catholic University of America.

== Career ==
Feinblatt began his career in the late 1970s as a legal services lawyer. He briefly transitioned to magazine writing before returning to the legal field, where he worked with New York's Victims Services agency until 1991. In that year, Times Square landlords, aiming to support gentrification, proposed a specialized court for minor offenses. The city provided funding and a building on 54th Street, with additional contributions from merchants. Feinblatt was selected to head this initiative. Eventually, he established the Midtown Community Court in the 1990s.

During Michael Bloomberg's tenure as the Mayor of New York City, Feinblatt served as the chief policy advisor and criminal justice coordinator. At City Hall, he utilized data analytics to enhance agency operations and provided counsel to Mayor Michael Bloomberg on various policy subjects. Their association started in 2001 through a data terminal system Feinblatt developed for the Center for Court Innovation, which he founded in 1996. Notably, the Center for Court Innovation was awarded the Innovations in American Government award in 1998 by the Harvard Kennedy School.

Previously, Feinblatt worked as a deputy executive director at Safe Horizon, served as a public defender with The Legal Aid Society, and was a research associate at the Vera Institute of Justice.

Feinblatt co-authored Good Courts: The Case for Problem-Solving Justice. The book has been reviewed by multiple publications such as the International Journal of Police Science and Management and the Justice System Journal.

== Personal life ==
Feinblatt married Bradley Mintz in one of New York States's first same-sex Jewish weddings after the Marriage Equality Act was signed into law in 2011. Their marriage ceremony was officiated by Michael Bloomberg.

== Bibliography ==
- Berman, Greg; Feinblatt, John (2005). Good Courts: The Case for Problem-Solving Justice
