= Gun laws in Florida =

Location of Florida in the United States

Gun laws in Florida regulate the sale, possession, and use of firearms and ammunition in the state of Florida in the United States.

== Summary table ==
Subject / law	Long guns	Handguns	Relevant statutes	Notes
State permit required to purchase?	No	No		
Waiting period?	Yes	Yes	Fla. Const. Article VIII § 5(b); Fla. Stat. § 790.0655	The mandatory waiting period is 3 days, excluding weekends and legal holidays, or expires upon the completion of the records checks, whichever occurs later. Individual counties can require a waiting period of up to five days. This requirement is waived for holders of a Florida Concealed Weapon license.
Firearm registration?	No	No	Fla. Stat. § 790.335	
Assault weapon law?	No	No		
Magazine capacity restriction?	No	No		
Owner license required?	No	No		
Red Flag law?	Yes	Yes	Fla. Stat. § 790.401	The police can get judicial approval to confiscate, for up to a year, the firearms of a person deemed a danger to themselves or others.
Permit required for concealed carry?	N/A	No	Fla. Stat. § 790.01	
Permit required for open carry?	No	No	Fla. Stat. § 790.25(3)	Florida's open carry ban was declared unconstitutional by Florida First District Court of Appeal on 10 September 2025. Florida Governor Ron DeSantis and Attorney General James Uthmeier welcomed the ruling and ordered law enforcement officers to no longer enforce the ban, effectively making Florida an open carry state. Open carry is now allowed without a permit. Local restrictions preempted.
Castle Doctrine/Stand Your Ground law?	Yes	Yes		
State preemption of local restrictions?	Yes	Yes	Fla. Stat. § 790.33	
NFA weapons restricted?	No	No	Fla. Stat. § 790.161; Fla. Stat. § 790.222	
Peaceable Journey laws?	No	No		
Background checks required for private sales?	No	No		
Purchase age restriction?	Yes	Yes	Fla. Stat. § 790.065(13)	The sale or transfer of a firearm to a person younger than 21 years of age may not be made or facilitated by a licensed importer, licensed manufacturer, or licensed dealer. The law restricts all long guns to those over 18 years old

== State constitutional provisions ==
Article I, Section 8 of the Constitution of Florida states:

Right to bear arms.—

“(a) The right of the people to keep and bear arms in defense of themselves and of the lawful authority of the state shall not be infringed, except that the manner of bearing arms may be regulated by law.

(b) There shall be a mandatory period of three days, excluding weekends and legal holidays, between the purchase and delivery at retail of any handgun. For the purposes of this section, “purchase” means the transfer of money or other valuable consideration to the retailer, and “handgun” means a firearm capable of being carried and used by one hand, such as a pistol or revolver. Holders of a concealed weapon permit as prescribed in Florida law shall not be subject to the provisions of this paragraph.

(c) The legislature shall enact legislation implementing subsection (b) of this section, effective no later than December 31, 1991, which shall provide that anyone violating the provisions of subsection (b) shall be guilty of a felony.

(d) This restriction shall not apply to a trade in of another handgun.”

== Preemption ==
Florida law prohibits localities from regulating firearms, other than with regards to zoning laws (i.e., for restricting where gun sellers may locate their businesses) and as provided for in the Florida Constitution in regards to regulating sales by non-licensed sellers in public forums. The Florida Legislature has since 1987 occupied the whole field of regulation of firearms and ammunition, including the purchase, sale, transfer, taxation, manufacture, ownership, possession, and transportation. Due to a lack of penalties associated with violating the preemption statute, it was almost universally ignored by city and county authorities until, on December 7, 2010, Representative Matt Gaetz introduced a bill to the Florida Legislature adding penalties for violating the existing preemption statute. It was signed into law by Governor Rick Scott on June 2, 2011. Penalties may include fines, removal from public office, termination of employment and other punishments. The penalties were initially ruled unconstitutional but subsequently upheld by the Florida Supreme Court.

== Firearms carry ==
=== Concealed carry ===
Effective July 1, 2023, Florida no longer requires a license for concealed carry.

Firearms regulations are uniform throughout Florida, and a carry license is valid everywhere other than in a few specially defined areas. These prohibited places include any police station, prison, courthouse, polling place, government meeting place, airport (inside the passenger terminal and sterile area), seaport, or tavern. Concealed carry is also prohibited in any school, except for authorized security personnel, armed marshals, and school employees and teachers who have received special training.

Anyone lawfully carrying a firearm in a concealed manner, may briefly and openly display the firearm to the ordinary sight of another person, unless the firearm is intentionally displayed in an angry or threatening manner, not in necessary self-defense.

"Concealed firearm" is defined in F.S.S.790.001(2) as "any firearm, as defined in subsection (6), which is carried on or about a person in such a manner as to conceal the firearm from the ordinary sight of another person."

As of 2018, school employees other than classroom teachers may choose to receive special training in order to carry a firearm at school. As of 2019, the program was expanded to include classroom teachers.

=== Open carry ===
Florida's open carry ban was declared unconstitutional by Florida First District Court of Appeal on 10 September 2025. Florida Governor Ron DeSantis and Attorney General James Uthmeier welcomed the ruling and ordered law enforcement officers to no longer enforce the ban, effectively making Florida an open carry state. Open carry is now allowed without a permit.

== Concealed carry license reciprocity ==
Florida recognizes firearm carry license issued by numerous other states.

As of June 2022, 37 states recognize the Florida concealed carry license while 12 states do not.

=== States recognizing Florida license ===
- Alabama
- Alaska
- Arizona
- Arkansas
- Colorado*
- Delaware
- Georgia
- Idaho
- Indiana
- Iowa
- Kansas
- Kentucky
- Louisiana
- Maine**
- Michigan*
- Mississippi
- Missouri
- Montana
- Nebraska
- Nevada
- New Hampshire**
- New Mexico
- North Carolina
- North Dakota
- Ohio
- Oklahoma
- Pennsylvania*
- South Carolina*
- South Dakota
- Tennessee
- Texas
- Utah
- Vermont****
- Virginia
- West Virginia
- Wisconsin***
- Wyoming

=== States not recognizing Florida license ===
- California
- Connecticut
- Hawaii
- Illinois
- Maryland
- Massachusetts
- Minnesota
- New Jersey
- New York
- Oregon
- Rhode Island
- Washington

* Must be a Florida resident

** State has permit-less carry but the license recognition law still requires residency

*** Wisconsin only honors Florida licenses issued to Non-Residents of Florida

**** Vermont does not recognize the Florida license by statute; however, Florida license holders are not prohibited from carrying under Vermont law.

== Vehicle carry ==
Vehicle carry either openly or concealed is legal without a license.

Handguns must be either "securely encased" F.S. 790.25(3)(l) or not immediately available for use. "Securely encased" means in a glove compartment, whether or not locked; snapped in a holster; in a gun case, whether or not locked; in a zippered gun case; or in a closed box or container which requires a lid or cover to be opened for access. Carry of a Handgun on one's person either openly or concealed inside a vehicle without a license is permitted. Once a handgun is securely encased, it can be stored anywhere inside the vehicle and is not limited to just the glove compartment/center console. "Yet, pursuant to the unambiguous language of section 790.25(5), even a securely encased weapon does not fall under the private conveyance exception if it is carried on the person. Doughty v. State, 979 So. 2d 1048, 1050 (Fla. 4th DCA 2008)(Internal citation marks omitted)

Long guns may be anywhere in a private conveyance when such firearm is being carried for a lawful use.

As of July 1, 2008, Florida became a "Take your gun to work" state (F.S. 790.251). This law prohibits most businesses from firing any employee for keeping a legal firearm locked in their vehicle in the company parking lot. The purpose of the new law is to allow citizens to exercise their Second Amendment rights during their commutes to and from work. Exceptions listed in F.S. 790.251(7) include school property, correctional institutions, nuclear power plants, national defense facilities, facilities for explosives or combustible materials, or a motor vehicle owned, rented, or leased by a person's employer.

A case was filed against Walt Disney World Resort by a former Disney security guard who was fired, despite having a CWL, for having a firearm locked in his car on July 1, in violation of Disney's pre-existing no weapons allowed policy. The case was later dropped by the plaintiff citing personal and financial reasons. Disney claims that they are exempt from the new state law, on the basis of their having a fireworks license for conducting nightly fireworks shows at Disney World.

== Castle doctrine and "stand your ground" ==
"Castle doctrine" refers to the generally accepted common-law principle that one is not required to retreat when in one's own dwelling. Eliminating the requirement to retreat outside the home (i.e., in public) is generally referred to as a "stand your ground" law. As of October 1, 2005, Florida became a "No Duty to Retreat" (i.e., Stand Your Ground) state. Florida Castle Doctrine law establishes that law-abiding residents and visitors may legally presume the threat of bodily harm or death from anyone who breaks into a residence or occupied vehicle and may use defensive force, including deadly force, against the intruder.

With the passage of Florida's Stand Your Ground law, this principle now also applies in any other place where a person "has a right to be." Essentially, that person has "no duty to retreat" if attacked and may "meet force with force, including deadly force if he or she reasonably believes it is necessary to do so to prevent death or great bodily harm to himself or herself or another or to prevent the commission of a forcible felony". Note that all of the generally accepted common-law principles of self-defense must still be followed.

A person who uses force within the parameters of the law is immune from criminal prosecution or civil action and cannot be arrested unless a law enforcement agency determines there is probable cause that the force used was unlawful. If a civil action is brought and the court finds the defendant to be immune under the law, the defendant will be awarded all costs of defense.

== Firearm sales ==
Buyers must be at least 21 years old to purchase any firearm in Florida from a licensed vendor. There is a waiting period of the longer of 3 business days or until background checks clear unless the purchaser has a concealed carry permit, is trading in a different firearm, the purchase is for a rifle or shotgun and the purchaser has completed a 16-hour hunter safety class in addition to holding a hunter safety certification card, or the purchaser is law enforcement or military.

As state law on waiting periods and background checks do not apply to sales by non-licensed sellers, the Florida Constitution, Art VIII Sec. 5(b), permits counties to enact ordinances that require a criminal history records check and a 3 to 5-day waiting period for non-licensed sellers when any part of a firearm sale is conducted on property to which the public has the "right of access", such as at a gun show conducted on public property. These local option ordinances may not be applied to holders of a concealed weapons license. Only Alachua County, Florida, Miami-Dade, Broward, Palm Beach, Hillsborough, and Volusia counties had enacted such ordinances.

== Risk protection order ==
Under Florida's red flag law, law enforcement can get judicial approval to confiscate, for up to a year, the firearms of a person deemed a danger to themselves or others. Lake County has adopted a Second Amendment sanctuary resolutions in response. It is estimated that 90 percent of cases the order is agreed to by the respondent.

In April 2009, following the killing of Mitchell Moore and the suicide of Jason McCarthy at the same Shoot Straight facility in Casselberry, the gun range's managers decided to suspend rentals until the state granted ranges with criminal and mental health background checks; Moore's killer, his own mother, had been involuntarily committed under Baker Act provisions, while McCarthy had been struggling with depression.

== Bump fire stock ==
The possession of a bump stock is illegal. According to Florida Law, the term “bump-fire stock” means a conversion kit, a tool, an accessory, or a device used to alter the rate of fire of a firearm to mimic automatic weapon fire or which is used to increase the rate of fire to a faster rate than is possible for a person to fire such semiautomatic firearm unassisted by a kit, a tool, an accessory, or a device. (F.S. 790.222). A class action lawsuit challenging the ban as an unconstitutional taking requiring just compensation was unsuccessful in the Leon County circuit court in May 2019 and in the 1st District Court of Appeal in January 2021.

== See also ==
- Gun law in the United States
- Law of Florida
- Marion Hammer
