= Marion Hammer =

American gun activist (born 1939)

Marion P. Hammer

55th President of the National Rifle Association of America
- In office 1995–1998
- Preceded by: Robert K. Corbin
- Succeeded by: Charlton Heston

Personal details
- Born: April 26, 1939 (age 87) Columbia, South Carolina, U.S.
- Occupation: Gun advocate, lobbyist

Marion P. Hammer (born April 26, 1939) is an American gun advocate and lobbyist who was the first female president of the National Rifle Association of America (NRA), from 1995 to 1998.

Hammer has been an influential NRA lobbyist since the 1970s, and is credited with influencing many of Florida's gun laws, including the 2005 Stand your ground law. Florida's laws have led to the enactment of similar laws across the United States. She developed an NRA program for children, Eddie Eagle GunSafe, in 1988. NRA promotes this program as an alternative to Child access prevention law (CAP) or safe storage laws.

In 2005, she was inducted into Florida Women's Hall of Fame. Hammer is currently very active in lobbying the NRA positions and helping to write pro-gun legislation with the Florida State Legislature, including participation in Senate and House committee meetings following the mass shooting at the Marjory Stoneman Douglas High School in Parkland, Florida, on 14 February 2018. Following the mass shooting, Hammer became the target of harassment for her lobbying activities.

== Early life ==
Hammer grew up on a farm owned by her grandparents near Columbia, South Carolina. They were relatively poor and engaged in subsistence hunting. She learned to shoot "squirrels and rabbits for dinner" with a .22 bolt-action single-shot rifle. She would go hunting after school. Her father served in World War II and died in Okinawa.

She married a man who also loved hunting and they entered shooting competitions together as part of "family recreational activities" which later included their children.

The major catalyst that led her to become a pro-gun activist was the Gun Control Act of 1968, which was passed in response to the assassinations of John F. Kennedy in 1963, Martin Luther King Jr. in April 1968, and Bobby Kennedy in June 1968. She has claimed "our government, that is supposed to protect us and our rights, decided to engage in some political eyewash."

In the mid-1980s, in a parking deck, Hammer claims she was followed by a car with five male passengers and a male driver who appeared to be either drunk or on drugs. Instead of running, she claims she stood firmly in front of the vehicle with her six-shot .38-caliber revolver, that she always carried in her purse, aimed at the car. She claims they quickly reversed and left.

== National Rifle Association (NRA) ==
Tallahassee, Florida-based Hammer served as NRA president, an NRA board member, and an NRA lobbyist for the state of Florida. She has been the executive director of the Unified Sportsmen of Florida, (USF) the NRA's affiliate in Florida, since 1976. She is a certified firearms instructor.

=== NRA President ===
Hammer had been an NRA member all her adult life, and had served as second and first vice president. On December 5, 1995, Thomas Washington, who was president of the NRA for 18 months during a period that was sometimes "embattled", died as a result a heart attack suffered while deer hunting. During his tenure, President George H. W. Bush, a pro-gun candidate and NRA life member, who had the NRA endorsement, resigned from the NRA after receiving an April 13, 1995 fundraising letter by NRA vice president Wayne LaPierre calling the Bureau of Alcohol, Tobacco, and Firearms (ARTs) "jack-booted government thugs". Following Washington's death, Hammer, "who was in line to succeed him, took over", becoming the "first female president in the 125-year history of the National Rifle Association." In a 1996 profile in The New York Times, she was described as being as "tough as a day-old biscuit" with a "startlingly deep" voice. She says, "It truly is not guns that kill people, individuals do." In 1996, with Hammer as president, NRA membership was at a record high with Republicans in power both in congress and in many state legislatures. New members included women, minorities, "hunters, target shooters and people who want to learn how to use guns to protect themselves from violent crime."

She served as president from 1995 to 1998.

=== Unified Sportsmen of Florida (USF) ===
USF logo

Hammer founded the pro-gun organisation Unified Sportsmen of Florida (USF) in 1977, becoming the NRA's affiliate in Florida. The group lobbied for Florida passing a shall issue concealed weapon and firearm license law in 1987. In 2019, it was reported that Hammer had received low-interest loans from the USF. Media reports noted they may have been unlawful under Florida Statute 617.0833, which regulates the circumstances under which not-for-profit corporations may loan money to their directors or officers.

=== NRA lobbyist ===
In an article in Newsweek, Hammer, who was described as a "78-year-old lobbyist who is "under five feet tall", carries a "handgun in her purse" and is the "most powerful [lobbyist] in her industry when it comes to pro-gun legislation". She has been active as a lobbyist in the state of Florida from the late 1970s and continues her position today. Hammer has been credited with being the force behind most gun laws in Florida for more than three decades, which included about 30 laws since 1998 alone. Republicans were in control of the Florida legislature during that time.

She "lobbied for and eventually pushed through" a 1987 Florida law that allows Floridians who "have no criminal records or mental illness" to carry concealed weapons with concealed-carry (CCW) permits.

In 2002, Hammer, on behalf of the NRA, "had lawmakers quietly move" the division handling the concealed weapons permit program to Florida's Department of Agriculture and Consumer Services. Until 2002, the Division of Licensing was under the Florida Department of State in Tallahassee. In all other American states, either the police or courts handles CCW permits. According to the Tampa Bay Times, on June 8, 2018, Hammer said, "What we did is we helped write the bill and then amended it onto somebody else's bill...It was just me. Just NRA. Just gun owners wanting to be sure the program was protected." From February 2016 through March 2017, the Florida Department of Agriculture and Consumer Services failed to use the National Instant Criminal Background Check System (NICS) on over 300,000 CCW permit applications, which meant that those with a mental illness or drug addiction, could get a CCW permit. By June 2018 Agriculture Commissioner Adam Putnam said that his office had revoked 291 permits erroneously granted to people who did not pass background checks. In 2018, the Tampa Bay Times revealed that between 2014 and 2018, with Putman as Agriculture Commissioner, 298 emails were exchanged between Hammer and employees of the Department of Agriculture. With Putman as Commissioner, Florida became the first and only state in the United States to grant over two million CCW permits. Nikki Fried, who replaced Putman in 2018 supports placing the CCW permit program under the Florida Department of Law Enforcement's authority and has criticized Hammer for her NRA lobbying regarding CCW permits. Hammer is lobbying to have the program placed under Republican Jimmy Patronis, the state Chief Financial Officer. Hammer said, "No program that facilitates a constitutional right should be under a politically appointed agency head, it must be under an elected official answerable to the people. I assure you 1.8 million (concealed weapons) license holders would not be happy if the program were disrupted." According to the Orlando Weekly, Fried said that "Politics should have no role in our concealed weapons permit process — the current system has allowed groups like the NRA to control our state government for long enough."

The hundreds of emails from Hammer to the Department of Agriculture, made available online by the Tampa Bay Times, include complaints about denied CCW license renewals, spam phone calls and email, South Korean dogs, and a specific pest control company that she claimed damaged a house she owned. They reveal that Hammer's "sphere of influence" was much wider than just gun legislation.

Hammer was "one of the chief architects" of the Stand-your-ground law that was signed into law by Governor Jeb Bush in 2005. It was the first to be passed in the United States. It was based on the Castle Doctrine. The controversy surrounding the trial George Zimmerman, who fatally shot 17-year-old Trayvon Martin, "focused attention once again on Florida's gun laws, and on Hammer's role in getting them passed." Hammer worked with Jeb Bush's chief of staff, Sally Bradshaw, on the stand-your-ground legislation. Bradshaw said, "There is no more tenacious presence in Tallahassee than Marion Hammer. A lot of lobbyists come and go, but Marion is part of a cause, and that means she has real credibility and a stick-with-it-ness that few can match. You want her on your side in a fight." Hammer told lawmakers "You can't expect a victim to wait before taking action to protect herself, and say: 'Excuse me, Mr. Criminal, did you drag me into this alley to rape and kill me or do you just want to beat me up and steal my purse?'" She criticized opponents of the legislation as "bleeding-heart criminal coddlers." Dennis Baxley (R-Fl), a funeral director, who worked with Hammer on the law and was its sponsor, said that Hammer's words resonated with the constituents of the county he represented, Marion County, Florida. Baxter described her as a "determined" and a "tremendous inspiration." He said, "She doesn't want to see anybody victimized. She is absolutely vibrant in protecting the Second Amendment." The law passed with almost no opposition. "Opposing it seemed like political suicide in Florida."

During the first six months after taking office in January 2011 as Governor of Florida, Rick Scott, who has an A+ NRA rating, signed three important pro-gun bills into law, Senate Bill 234, House Bill 155, and House Bill 45, by the end of the May 7th, 2011, when the Florida legislature adjourned. The first made the Right-to-Carry or Concealed Weapons Licensing law, more pro-gun. House Bill 155 would allow gun-owners to carry guns into doctor's offices and examining rooms. The third, House Bill 45, which was co-sponsored by state Representative Matt Gaetz (R-4) and which Hammer, "worked to enact", "punishes local officials who attempt to establish gun regulations stricter than those imposed at the state level. Officials can be fined thousands of dollars and removed from office." N.R.A. papers show that it was "deeply involved in advocating" for House Bill 45. Hammer "oversaw its development" which included monitoring even "minor adjustments to the bill's language." In an exchange of emails about "three draft amendments" including one about "where fines should be deposited", an analyst corresponded with Hammer, "Marion, I've spoken with you about the first one"; an analyst "said she'd spoken with you about the others. Let me know what you think."

Hammer's influence was felt across the United States as Florida pro-gun laws, according to Bloomberg News, became the model for similar laws passed in a majority of U.S. states. Hammer's efficacy as lobbyist in Florida for her Second Amendment agenda, has led to Florida being dubbed the "Gunshine State" — not just the "Sunshine State".

In a February 2, 2017 opinion piece, Hammer wrote that, in "the 1970s and 1980s, one of the more blatant areas of abuse by local governments was the unconstitutional regulation of Second Amendment rights. With no justification whatever, and based solely on the personal views of elected local officials, all manner of unconstitutional ordinances existed in many jurisdictions... With the growing arrogance and misconduct by local governments, more preemption laws are inevitable and necessary." Since the 1987 law that gave the state of Florida "exclusive right to regulate firearms", local governments imposed their own additional regulations. Hammer described these "local gun haters" as flouting the 1987 law. She said that these laws that differed from locality to locality, meant that "law-abiding people" who were bearing arms "had no way of knowing what these local regulations were. In June 2011 Governor Rick Scott, signed a "tough" new Florida statewide law, that "forbid city and county governments from enacting or enforcing local gun-control regulations." The law, which was backed by the NRA, applies hefty fines to any city of county that tries to "adopt or enforce local gun laws". As NRA lobbyist, Hammer was cited as saying, "The Constitution [Second Amendment] protects the right to keep and bear arms. Local governments are not allowed to regulate the Bill of Rights." She criticized the February 26, 2014 actions of the Tallahassee Mayor Andrew Gillum who subsequently was sued by Florida Carry and the Second Amendment Foundation. She said Mayor Andrew Gillum's attack on NRA was "unwise"; he was just "stomping his feet for attention."

In a November 30, 2017 statement, Hammer sent a statement to the USF and NRA members and friends, calling on them to email Florida Supreme Court Justice Barbara Pariente to tell her to resign. Her letter included the November 30, 2017 News Service Florida weekly political briefing notes, launching Hammer's campaign to "purge" Justice Pariente from a case, "which centers on whether [Governor Scott, who is pro-gun] or his successor has the legal authority to appoint replacements for three justices" that "could have far-reaching implications for the makeup of the court". In an interview with the News Service, Hammer said that, "The majority of our [The Supreme Court of Florida|Florida supreme court] is ...liberal leaning and biased against the Second Amendment of the U.S. Constitution." In March 2017, the court "upheld a longstanding ban on people openly carrying firearms in public." In September 2017, the Supreme Court of Florida, unanimously voted to "dr[a]w a line in the sand in Florida's stand your ground law by saying the determination of immunity in a criminal case does not carry over to a civil case."

In December 2017, Hammer responded to the rejection by the Florida Senate Judiciary Committee of pro-gun proposals that would have loosened gun laws regarding carrying concealed-weapons near courthouses, religious institutions, private schools, day care facilities, and the inadvertent display of handguns. She said that, the proposal to "allow Floridians with concealed-weapons licenses to carry firearms" at religious institutions, is a "private property-rights measure." She said with "2018 an election year it's important to know who isn't being truthful in their support of Second Amendment issues...We had Republicans who joined the Democrats as obstructionists last year, and bills would be (temporarily postponed), which was a type of protectionism for Republicans. This year, thankfully, they voted. They've been outed, and now we can report it." The NRA Political Victory Fund (the NRA's political action committee), keeps track of allegiance to NRA values through a scoring system established in the 1970s, by which they rate political candidates "based on voting records, and public statements" on their positions on gun rights on a point scale ranging from A+ to F. Governor Rick Scott, for example had the highest rating of A+ for his "unmatched record of support for the Second Amendment in Florida. Rick has signed more pro-gun bills into law in one term than any other governor in Florida history."

On February 22, 2018, in her position as USF executive director and as past president of the NRA, Hammer asked USF and NRA members and friends to email politicians that "Gun control won't protect our children." She recommended that politicians focus on providing armed security in schools and on tightening of mental health laws.

On April 18, 2018, in her position as USF executive director and past president of the NRA, Hammer lambasted dozens of Florida Republican state representatives over their votes on SB 7026, the Marjory Stoneman Douglas High School Public Safety Act, calling them "betrayers" who "lacked the courage to uphold their oath of office and keep their word to constituents who voted for them." In particular, she singled out Senator Doug Broxson as the "linchipin," saying that he "caved to threats and promises from Senate leadership and switched his vote and sold you out."

In June 2022, it was announced that Hammer would retire as the state lobbyist for the NRA-Institute for Legislative Action (ILA) in Florida, taking on a new role as an adviser to the NRA, focused on national gun advocacy.

In April 2024, it was reported that the NRA had terminated Hammer's $220,000/yr "retirement contract" consulting for the NRA, as well as a $50,000/yr contract consulting for the NRA's Institute for Legislative Affairs.

=== Eddie Eagle GunSafe ===
Hammer began to develop the NRA program for children, Eddie Eagle GunSafe, in 1988, which was updated by Lisa Monroe, a University of Oklahoma School of Education early childhood education specialist contracted by the NRA. The NRA promotes Eddie Eagle GunSafe as an alternative to the (CAP law) or safe storage law. Marion Hammer, the NRA lobbyist who promoted the stand-your-ground law, created the Eddie Eagle GunSafe program in the late 1980s. According to the NRA, by 2016, there were 28 million children who had completed the Eddie Eagle program. In their testimony in Tennessee in 2016, the NRA lobbyist said that the Eddie Eagle program was the most effective way "to reduce firearm-related accidents" regarding children.

== Awards ==
Hammer was awarded with the Outstanding Community Service Award from the National Safety Council in 1993. In 2005, Hammer was inducted into the Florida Women's Hall of Fame. In 2020, Hammer was listed by Slate as one of its "Most Influential Americans Over 80."

== Personal life ==
Hammer's grandson has a disability and she has lobbied so that children with dyslexia can "use talking computers during standardized tests". She has "helped secure funding for the McKay scholarships for children with disabilities" and for funding to install "speed-limit signs outside private schools". Sally, the youngest of Hammer's three daughters was "diagnosed with a terminal, inoperable brain tumor" in 1995. When Sally's husband left shortly after the diagnosis, she and her two young children, 3-year-old Eric and Kayla, who was under one at the time, went to live with Hammer.

== Critics ==
In her first year as NRA president, Hammer was criticized for holding the NRA convention on April 19, 1996, the one-year anniversary of the Oklahoma City bombing. "Critics called that decision insensitive at best." She said that the scheduling was done before the tragic bombing and if the NRA had rescheduled, "People would have said the only reason they changed it was because they somehow felt responsible."

According to a 2016 article in Newsweek, Hammer was allegedly involved in having a lawsuit against a skeet club dropped. In 2015 Southwest Florida Water Management District (Swiftmud), sued the Skyway Trap & Skeet Club in St. Petersburg for not building a barrier that would prevent spent ammunition from accumulating in neighboring Sawgrass Lake Park, a public wetland. In a February 11, 2016 statement, Hammer called on Governor Scott, Attorney General Pam Bondi, and the Florida legislature to abolish Swiftmud and to investigate Swiftmud's "blatant and wanton Civil Rights/Second Amendment rights violations." Hammer wrote that Swiftmud was "a malignant state agency that uses unlimited tax dollars in what I can only called an evil attempt to steal private property and destroy a small private business." Hammer met with Ben Albritton, the head of the committee that funds Swiftmud. Hammer said that an NRA lawyer wrote the document that spelled out the terms of the dismissal of the Swiftmud lawsuit. Hammer then sent this to Albritton and Governor Scott's office. Albritton had his assistant send an email to Swiftmud's Colleen Thayer with an attachment that spelled out the terms of the dismissal of the Swiftmud lawsuit. It was written as if Swiftmud had already consented to it. The digital signature on the document was "Marion".

== Harassment following Stoneman Douglas High School shooting ==
Following the February 14, 2018 Stoneman Douglas High School shooting in which Nikolas Cruz killed fourteen students and three staff members using an AR-15 style rifle, Hammer participated in Senate and House committee meetings to advocate for the NRA. On July 13, 2018, Hammer filed federal and state lawsuits seeking over $2 million in damages from five men who she claimed had harassed her in response to her appearances in these meetings. In court filings, she claimed to have been harassed in person, through phone calls and via email.

On November 28, 2018, U.S. District Judge Robert Hinkle dismissed Hammer's claims against Lawrence Sorensen, a California attorney who had sent her two emails on March 24 with graphic images of gunshot wounds. Justice Hinkle said that Sorensen's emails, which he described as "disgusting" were protected by the First Amendment. Justice Hinkle said that, "The photographs were graphic, partly because they apparently depicted actual injuries. But images as graphic, or nearly so, can be seen in movies and video games, on cable if not also network television, and in medical literature. The photographs were germane to the policy debate that Ms. Hammer regularly participated in and Mr. Sorensen apparently sought to join. Sending these photographs, at least in these circumstances, was not tortious. And treating them as tortious would violate the First Amendment." The dismissal is "limited to Sorensen".

== See also ==
- Gun laws in Florida

National Rifle Association of America
Preceded by Thomas L. Washington	President of the NRA; 1995–1998	Succeeded by Charlton Heston
