= David Riedman =

American data scientist and school safety researcher

- Education: Professor
- Occupation: Data Scientist
- Website: https://k12ssdb.org/

David Riedman is an American data scientist and university professor with research on school gun violence, threat assessment, artificial intelligence, security, and emergency management. He is the founder of the K-12 School Shooting Database, a public research project documenting shootings on school property in the United States.

== Education ==
Riedman earned a Bachelor of Arts degree in English from Georgetown University and a Master of Arts degree in National Security Affairs from the Naval Postgraduate School. He completed a graduate certificate in data science at the Massachusetts Institute of Technology and earned a PhD in Artificial Intelligence from Capitol Technology University. His doctoral research examined the viability of using artificial intelligence large language model assessments to school shooting threats and compared the LLMs assessments with those made by human experts.

== Career ==
Riedman joined Idaho State University as an assistant professor. His teaching and research interests include artificial intelligence, risk management, terrorism, intelligence analysis, and national security policy.

Before entering academia full-time, Riedman worked in homeland security and emergency management consulting. He held management positions supporting the Department of Homeland Security and Federal Emergency Management Agency, including work involving disaster response planning, national preparedness, and homeland security grant programs. He also served as a captain in the Montgomery County, Maryland, Division of Fire and Rescue Services, where he worked as a firefighter and emergency medical technician.

Riedman began developing the K-12 School Shooting Database in 2018, after identifying a lack of comprehensive historical data on shootings at schools in the United States. The database documents incidents dating back to the 1960s and is publicly accessible for research and analysis. Its data have been used in academic studies, government reports, and news coverage concerning school gun violence. The United States Government Accountability Office has used the database in its analysis of the characteristics of school shootings.

Riedman has collaborated with researchers studying school shooting threats, the circumstances surrounding firearm incidents, and approaches to preventing planned attacks. His work has also examined how school shooting data can inform public policy and the evaluation of school security practices.

== Research and publications ==
Riedman's research has addressed school shooting patterns, behavioral threat assessment, critical infrastructure protection, and security policy. He has contributed to peer-reviewed research examining the characteristics of school shooting threats and the circumstances in which potential attacks are identified and prevented.

In addition to academic publications, Riedman writes the Riedman Report, a publication covering risk, artificial intelligence, education, and security.

In October 2026, Riedman provided extensive commentary to the New York Times in two articles about the patterns in gun violence on school campuses over time and the need for prevention efforts that identify “influencer extremists”and other warning signs instead of fortifying buildings.

In October 2023, he appeared on the Freakonomics Radio Podcast in an interview about the K-12 School Shooting Database and the sequence of events that can lead to a shooting.

== Selected publications ==
• Peterson, J., Densley, J., Riedman, D., Spaulding, J., and Malicky, H. (2023). “An Exploration of K–12 School Shooting Threats in the United States.” Journal of Threat Assessment and Management.

• “How to Succeed at Failing, Part 1: The Chain of Events (Update).” Freakonomics Radio, May 9, 2025.

• “Inside a Month of America's School Shootings.” The Economist, 2023.

• “What We Don't Know about School Shooter Drills.” New England Journal of Medicine, Intention to Treat, September 2023.

• “What Data Analysis Tells Us About School Shootings.” PBS NewsHour, February 2023.
