= Child access prevention law =

Law that regulate access to firearms

A child access prevention law (often abbreviated CAP law; also sometimes called a safe storage law) makes it illegal for an adult to keep a gun in a place and manner so that a child can easily access and fire it. Proponents of these laws, such as the Law Center to Prevent Gun Violence in the United States, argue that they are effective at reducing accidental gun deaths among children, since they reduce accessibility and thereby risk. The National Rifle Association of America has lobbied against such laws, arguing that they are ineffective and infringe on the rights of gun owners to protect their homes.

== United Kingdom ==
Since the introduction of licensing with the Firearms Act 1968, it has been a condition of firearm and shotgun certificates that licensed firearms must be securely stored prevent access or theft by unlicensed individuals, including children.

This did not affect air rifles and air pistols which are mostly unlicensed. Section 46 of the Crime and Security Act 2010 imposed a new duty on owners of airguns to take reasonable precautions to prevent persons under the age of eighteen from accessing that airgun.

== United States of America ==
=== Federal Laws ===
There is no federal CAP law, nor does federal law require the safe storage of guns.

However, according to Protection of Lawful Commerce in Arms Act, it is unlawful for any licensed gun carrier to transfer firearms without safe storage. The Gun-Free School Zones Act of 1990 makes it illegal for unauthorized individuals to carry firearms into an area that, to their knowledge, is a school zone. This law includes public and private elementary and high schools and non-private property up to 1000 feet of a school. A case in 2007, United States v Nieves-Castaño, found Nieves guilty for having a firearm in her apartment, a public housing project, which was within a 1000 feet of a school. If found guilty, individuals face fines up to $5000, or imprisonment of up to five years. Guilty individuals are also prohibited from purchasing firearms in the future. There have been attempts to repeal the act in 2007 and 2009 but these bills did not pass committee. The law does not however apply to private property, or individuals who are licensed to carry in the state where the school zone is located. The firearm can also be placed in a locked container or not be loaded.

=== State laws ===
Individual states decide what actions warrant criminal liability. As of 2019, 27 states and the District of Columbia have passed Child Access Prevention laws, though 11 states require "intentionally, knowingly, or recklessly" storing firearms to be criteria for criminal liability, rather than negligent storage. Four states (California, Massachusetts, Minnesota, and Maryland) have the most stringent CAP laws that impose criminal liability when a minor is merely likely to gain access to a gun that is negligently stored. On the other end of the spectrum, some states, such as Utah, only impose criminal liability when a minor is directly provided a gun by an adult. In Massachusetts, all firearms are required to be stored using a locking device, and allowing a child unsupervised access to a handgun can result in a $5,000 fine and/or 2.5 years in jail.

== Studies ==
A 1997 study found that CAP laws were associated with a 23% decrease in accidental shooting deaths among children younger than 15 years old. A 2000 study found that Florida's CAP law appeared to have "significantly reduced unintentional firearm deaths to children", but that the similar laws that existed in 14 other states did not seem to have such an effect. At the time, only three states in the U.S., including Florida, allowed those who violated their state's CAP law to be prosecuted on felony charges. A 2004 study found that CAP laws were associated with a "modest reduction in suicide rates among youth aged 14 to 17 years." A 2006 study found that states with CAP laws experienced faster declines in accidental child firearm deaths than states without such laws. A 2015 study found that these laws have no significant impact on unintentional gun deaths, but that states with such laws had lower rates of youth suicide. Another study also points out that prevalence of guns might possibly affect suicide rates in general. Some studies have also found that CAP laws are associated with lower rates of nonfatal gun injuries among children under the age of 18. A recent 2020 study differentiated between states with stronger CAP laws and states with weaker CAP laws and found that stronger CAP laws were associated with a 13% reduction in all shooting deaths among children younger than 15 years old, with a 15% reduction in homicides, a 12% reduction in suicides, and a 13% reduction in accidental deaths.

A 2018 National Bureau of Economic Research paper found that CAP laws were associated with a 19 percent reduction in juvenile firearm-related homicides (while having no association with firearm-related homicides committed by adults or with non-firearm-related homicides committed by juveniles). In contrast, a 2016 study found that these CAP laws were ineffective.

A survey published by Johns Hopkins Bloomberg School of Public Health estimated that 54% of gun owners in the United States had unsafe storage of guns. Additionally, Harvard T.H. Chan School of Public Health has estimated that some 380,000 guns are stolen annually from gun owners in the United States. In a separate study, the US Bureau of Alcohol, Tobacco, Firearms and Explosives estimated that 18,394 guns were lost of stolen by licensed gun retailers. Child access prevention laws vary in scope, but stricter versions impose criminal liability when a minor is likely to gain access to a negligently stored firearm. Safe-storage guidance commonly recommends that firearms be stored locked and unloaded, with ammunition secured separately, to reduce unauthorized access by children and other at-risk individuals.

CAP laws, along with other strict firearm laws, are also associated with lower rates of unsafe gun storage among parents of preschool-age children. These laws are not always applied whenever they could be, and sometimes minors are charged instead.

In regard to the effects of CAP laws on schools, a study using data from the Youth Risk Behavior Survey for 1993-2013 found that CAP laws lead to an 18.5% decrease in the rate of gun carrying. The study also found a 19% decrease in students being threatened or injured with a weapon on school property. As July 2004, the US Secret Service and US Department of Education published a study examining 37 school shootings from 1974-2000 that found that in more than 65% of cases, the attacker got the gun from his or her own home or that of a relative. However, the study finds no evidence of a link between CAP laws and an increased or decrease in school shootings.

== Opposition ==
Marion Hammer, the National Rifle Association of America (NRA) lobbyist who promoted stand-your-ground laws, created the Eddie Eagle GunSafe program in the late 1980s as a "superior alternative to negligent storage legislation, or laws meant to punish adults when children shoot themselves or someone else with an unsecured gun." By 2016, according to the NRA, who "promotes the program to elementary schools around the country, and pushes state legislatures to pass laws that require schools to adopt the lesson", 28 million children had been gone through the Eddie Eagle program. In 2016, a NRA lobbyist testified against a safe storage bill in Tennessee, saying that the Eddie Eagle program was the best way "to reduce firearm-related accidents" regarding children. However, some studies have found its effectiveness questionable.
