= Gun laws in Texas =

Location of Texas in the United States

Gun laws in Texas regulate the sale, possession, and use of firearms and ammunition in the U.S. state of Texas.

Texas is often perceived to have some of the most permissive gun laws in the United States. Since September 1, 2021, a permit is not required for a person, both residents and non-residents, 21 and over to carry a handgun either openly or concealed in most places in Texas, granted they do not have any prior felony convictions. This legislative change has raised concerns about public safety and has been met with resistance from gun safety advocates, especially in light of mass shootings in the state. Prior to this date, the Texas Department of Public Safety issued a License to Carry a Handgun to an eligible person on a shall issue basis. Texas has state preemption of gun laws, so local governments can not further restrict or regulate the possession or use of firearms. Texas does not restrict NFA weapons that are legally possessed under federal law. The state does not require background checks for private sales of firearms, as there is currently no federal requirement of background checks for sales between unlicensed individuals.

Black powder pistols and long arms are not considered to be firearms in the state of Texas, as they are federally classified as antique firearms, and thus may be freely carried either open or concealed without permit or prejudice.

== Summary table ==
Subject / law	Long guns	Handguns	Relevant statutes	Notes
State permit required to purchase?	No	No		
Firearm registration?	No	No		
Assault weapon law?	No	No		
Magazine capacity restriction?	No	No		
Owner license required?	No	No		
Red flag law?	No	No		(Also known as the Extreme Risk law.) Texas doesn't have a red-flag law, which allows for temporary firearm removal from individuals believed to be at risk of harming themselves or others.
Permit required for concealed carry?	N/A	No	Tex. Government Code § 411.172; Tex. Penal Code § 46.02	Texas is a "shall issue" state for citizens and lawful permanent residents who are 21 years or older. Permitless carry took effect on September 1, 2021.
Permit required for open carry?	No	No	Tex. Penal Code § 42.01(a)(8); Tex. Penal Code § 46.02	Handguns must be carried in a holster. Open carry on college campuses is prohibited. Permitless carry took effect on September 1, 2021.
Campus carry?	No	Yes	Tex. Government Code § 411.2031; Tex. Penal Code § 46.03	May carry in parking lots, parking garages, outdoor walkways on campus. Public four-year universities and public two-year colleges must allow concealed carry in campus buildings. Universities and colleges will be allowed to designate certain sensitive areas as "gun free zones"; these are subject to legislative analysis.
Castle Doctrine/Stand Your Ground law?	Yes	Yes	Tex. Penal Code § 9.32	
State preemption of local restrictions?	Yes	Yes	Tex. Government Code § 411.209; Tex. Local Government Code § 229.001; Tex. Local Government Code § 236.002	
NFA weapons restricted?	No	No	Tex. Penal Code § 46.05	
Peaceable Journey laws?	Yes	Yes	Tex. Penal Code § 46.02(a)(2); Tex. Penal Code § 46.15(b)(2)	
Background checks required for private sales?	No	No		
Duty to inform?	No	Yes	Tex. Government Code § 411.205	Only when one has a concealed carry permit.

== Background checks and private sales ==
Texas does not require background checks for private firearm sales, which has led to criticism from gun safety advocates. This 'gun show loophole' allows private transactions without oversight, contributing to concerns about unlicensed sales and illegal firearm trafficking.

== Possession of firearms ==
Texas has no laws regarding possession of any firearm regardless of age; all existing restrictions in State law mirror Federal law except for the prohibition of zip guns (improvised gun). A person of any age may possess a firearm such as at a firing range. Texas and Federal law only regulate the ownership of all firearms to 18 years of age or older, and regulate the transfer of handguns to 21 years or older by FFL dealers. However, a private citizen may sell, gift, lease etc. a handgun to anyone over 18 who is not felon or is a felon that is 5 years removed from felony infraction of probation or parole end date and is now a law abiding citizen. Federal law provides age limit exceptions for the temporary transfer and possession of handguns and handgun ammunition for specified activities, including employment, ranching, farming, target practice and hunting. NFA weapons other than clubs are also only subject to Federal restrictions; no State regulations exist for NFA weapons other than clubs. Municipal and county ordinances on possession and carry are generally overridden (preempted) due to the wording of the Texas Constitution, which gives the Texas Legislature (and it alone) the power to "regulate the wearing of arms, with a view to prevent crime". Penal Code Section 1.08 also prohibits local jurisdictions from enacting or enforcing any law that conflicts with State statute. Local ordinances restricting discharge of a firearm are generally allowed as State law has little or no specification thereof, but such restrictions do not preempt State law concerning justification of use of force and deadly force.

In Texas a convicted felon may possess a firearm in the residence in which he lives once five years have elapsed from his release from prison or parole, whichever is later, however if the felony conviction was outside of Texas, Federal Law prohibits possession unless the gun rights of the possessor have been restored in the jurisdiction under which the felony occurred in. A convicted Felon once 5 years removed from release from prison or probation may also private purchase a firearm. Under Texas Penal Code §§ 12.33, 46.04, the unlawful possession of a firearm is a third degree felony with a punishment range of two to ten years for a defendant with one prior felony conviction and fine up to $10,000.

== Firearms carry ==
There is no legal statute specifically prohibiting the carry of a firearm. However, if the firearm is displayed in a manner "calculated to cause alarm", then it is "disorderly conduct". Open carry of a handgun in public had long been illegal in Texas, except when the carrier was on their own property or had lawful control over, was legally hunting, or was participating in some gun-related public event such as a gun show. The 2015 Texas Legislature passed a bill to allow concealed handgun permit holders to begin carrying handguns openly. The bill was signed into law on June 13, 2015, and took effect on January 1, 2016. On September 1, 2021, new legislation became effective which removed licensing restrictions on concealed firearms. Texas concealed carry laws underwent significant changes with the introduction of permitless carry in 2021. This allows most Texans to carry handguns without a permit, provided they are not prohibited by state or federal laws. This shift has prompted debates on public safety and the implications of more permissive gun laws.

== Gun violence rates and trends ==
Texas has seen a significant rise in firearm-related fatalities over the past two decades. According to the U.S. Centers for disease control and prevention, the firearm death rate in Texas has reached 15 per 100,000 people in 2021, marking a 50% increase since 1999. This trend is attributed to several factors, including easier access to firearms and increased violence during the COVID-19 pandemic.

=== License to carry ===
The Texas handgun carry permit was previously called a "Concealed Handgun License" or CHL. This has changed on Jan 1. 2016 to LTC "License To Carry" and at the same time the laws changed to include "Open Carry". Permits are issued on a non-discretionary ("shall-issue") basis to all eligible, qualified applicants. Texas has full reciprocity agreements with 30 states, not including Vermont (which is an "unrestricted" state and neither issues nor requires permits), most of these having some residency restrictions (the holder must either be a resident of Texas or a non-resident of the reciprocal state for the Texas license to be valid in that state). Texas recognizes an additional 11 states' concealed-carry permits unilaterally; those states do not recognize Texas' own permit as valid within their jurisdiction, usually due to some lesser requirement of the Texas permit compared to their own.

The handgun licensing law spelled out the eligibility criteria that was to be met. For example, an applicant would need to be eligible to purchase a handgun under the State and Federal laws (including an age restriction of 21), however an exception was granted to active members of the military age 18 or over. A number of factors could still make a person ineligible (temporarily or permanently) to obtain a license, including:

- felony convictions (permanent) and Class A or B misdemeanors (5 years, permanent in cases of domestic violence), including charges that resulted in probation or deferred adjudication;
- pending criminal charges (indefinite until resolved);
- chemical or alcohol dependency (defined as 2 convictions for substance-related offenses in a 10-year period; 10-year ban from the date of the first conviction);
- certain types of psychological diagnoses (indefinite until the condition is testified by a medical professional as being in remission);
- protective or restraining orders (indefinite until rescinded); or
- defaults on taxes, student loans, child support and/or other governmental fees (indefinite until resolved).

This last category, though having little to do with a person's ability to own a firearm, is in keeping with Texas policy for any licensing; those who are delinquent or in default on State-regulated debts or court judgments are generally barred from obtaining or renewing any State-issued license (including driver licenses), as an incentive to settle those debts.

"Information regarding any psychiatric, drug, alcohol, or criminal history" is required only from new users. Renewals are required every five years, but are granted without further inquiry into or update of this information.

An eligible person wishing to obtain an LTC (formerly CHL) must take a State-set instruction course taught by a licensed instructor for a minimum of 4 hours and a maximum of 6 hours, covering topics such as applicable laws, conflict resolution, criminal/civil liability, and handgun safety, and pass a practical qualification at a firing range with a handgun. The caliber requirement was repealed on September 1, 2017. Such courses vary in cost, but are typically around $100–$125 for new applicants (usually not including the cost of ammunition and other shooting supplies; the practical qualification requires firing 50 rounds of ammunition). They may then apply, providing a picture, fingerprints, other documentation, and a $40 application fee (as of September 1, 2017; previously $140 and $70 for renewals), – active and discharged military are eligible for discounts – to the DPS, which processes the application, runs a federal background check, and if all is well, issues the permit. Permits are valid for five years, and allow resident holders to carry in 29 other states (nonresidents may carry in all but four of those), due to reciprocity agreements. Discounted LTC fees vary from $0 for active duty military (through one year after discharge), to $25 for military veterans.

As of September 1, 2019, unlicensed concealed or open carry was allowed during an evacuation following the declaration of a state of disaster, or returning after evacuation, for a period of 7 days, which may be further extended by the governor. Carrying in some otherwise prohibited locations that serve as shelters is also allowed with permission of the owner of the premises.

Also, as of September 1, 2019, the offence of a Licensed to Carry holder entering on the premises of a church, synagogue, or other established place of religious worship was redacted from Texas Penal Code Sections 46.035(b). A church, synagogue, or other established place of religious worship must have 30.06 and 30.07 signs posted to prevent carrying on their premises.

=== College carry laws ===
Public four-year universities (as of August 1, 2016) and public two-year colleges (as of August 1, 2017) must allow concealed carry in campus buildings as well. Universities will be allowed to establish rules and regulations regarding safety but may not generally prohibit concealed carry on the campus.

== Red flag laws ==
Texas does not have red flag laws, also known as Extreme Risk Protection Orders, which allow courts to temporarily remove firearms from individuals deemed a threat to themselves or others. While these laws have proven effective in other states, Texas lawmakers have not pursued them, citing concerns over Second Amendment rights and due process.

=== Restrictions on licensed carry ===
While a resident of Texas (or a nonresident holding a recognized permit) is generally authorized to carry in most public places, there are State and Federal laws that still restrict a permit holder from carrying a weapon in certain situations. These include:

- Federal buildings - Premises owned by the U.S. Federal Government or its agencies for the purpose of any official business of the Federal Government are covered by Federal statutes that supersede State law. It is illegal in general under said statutes to possess a firearm while in any such location, and possession of a State-issued concealed firearms permit is no defense. Such places commonly encountered include post offices, Federal courts, and offices of the IRS, FBI, Justice Department, Department of Energy, USDA, FDA, etc. A rider tied to the 2009 Federal CARD Act has restricted the Department of the Interior from enacting or enforcing restrictions on carry of arms within lands controlled by the Bureau of Land Management; CHL permittees may carry concealed while in a federal park or wildlife preserve contained wholly or partially within the borders of the State of Texas. However, Army Corps of Engineers properties (including all reservoir lakes and included park areas) are still off-limits.
- Schools - Concealed carry in a school may be a felony under TPC section 46.03: "A person commits an offense if the person intentionally, knowingly, or recklessly possesses or goes with a firearm, illegal knife, club, or prohibited weapon listed in Section 46.05(a): ... on the physical premises of a school or educational institution, any grounds or building on which an activity sponsored by a school or educational institution is being conducted, or a passenger transportation vehicle of a school or educational institution, whether the school or educational institution is public or private, unless pursuant to written regulations or written authorization of the institution [emphasis added]." Schools have the ability to allow school employees to be armed. The age/grade level, funding type or for-profit status of the school does not matter. Carry of a concealed weapon while in a public outdoor area surrounding an educational building is permitted; as defined by TPC 46.035(f)(3), "premises" refers only to a building or part of a building, and does not refer to driveways, streets, sidewalks, parking lots, parking garages, or privately owned vehicles. Anyone with a license to carry a handgun, including employees of schools, are able to keep their firearms within their vehicles.
- Public sporting events - It is a Class A misdemeanor to carry while inside a building currently being used for an interscholastic or professional sporting event, unless the person carrying is a participant in the sporting event and said sporting event requires the use of the firearm (i.e. a target shooting competition).
- Amusement park - Must have 30.06 and 30.07 signs posted otherwise it is legal to carry.
- Hospital - Must have 30.06 and 30.07 signs posted otherwise it is legal to carry.
- Businesses posting a compliant "51% sign" - It is a felony to carry a firearm while on the premises of a business that makes more than 51% of its revenue from the sale of alcoholic beverages for on-premises consumption (colloquially "bars", "nightclubs", "taverns", "saloons", etc.). A person with a LTC that is in violation has a defense that the establishment did not post the proper signage, as required by the Government Code section 411.204. The proper signage contains similar language as is required of all liquor license holders, but with the addition of a couple of words to prohibit licensed as well as unlicensed carry, and a background containing a red "51%" to make it obvious at a glance that the sign applies to LTC holders.
- Correctional facilities - It is a felony, whether licensed or not, to carry inside a building generally termed a "jail" or "prison".
- Execution premises - within 1,000 feet of premises the location of which is designated by the Texas Department of Criminal Justice as a place of execution under Article 43.19, Code of Criminal Procedure, on a day that a sentence of death is set to be imposed on the designated premises and the person received notice that: (A) going within 1,000 feet of the premises with a weapon listed under this subsection was prohibited; or (B) possessing a weapon listed under this subsection within 1,000 feet of the premises was prohibited.
- Courts or court offices - It is a felony, whether licensed or not, to carry inside a building used by a functioning municipal, state or federal court for official business. Exceptions are granted to certain employees of those offices, such as judges, attorneys, bailiffs, and law enforcement officials.
- Election polling places - It is a felony, whether licensed or not, to carry inside a building being used as a polling center for any municipal, state and/or federal elections process on the scheduled voting date or while polling is underway. This is significant, as a local business or other generally public building, which would normally not prohibit concealed carry, may offer their facilities for use as a polling place. A person would be in violation if they entered the building on the day voting occurs, even if the polls are not open at the time, and even if the license holder is there for some other purpose than to vote.
- Racetracks - It is a felony, whether licensed or not, to carry a firearm on the premises of a racetrack (horse or dog).
- Airport - Only within the secured area of an airport.
- While intoxicated - LTC holders may not carry in any place or at any time while intoxicated (Penal Code 46.035.), defined as: (a) not having the normal use of mental or physical faculties by reason of the introduction of alcohol, a controlled substance, a drug, a dangerous drug, a combination of two or more of those substances, or any other substance into the body; or (B) having an alcohol concentration of 0.08 percent BAC or more (Penal Code 49.01.)

==== 30.06 signage ====
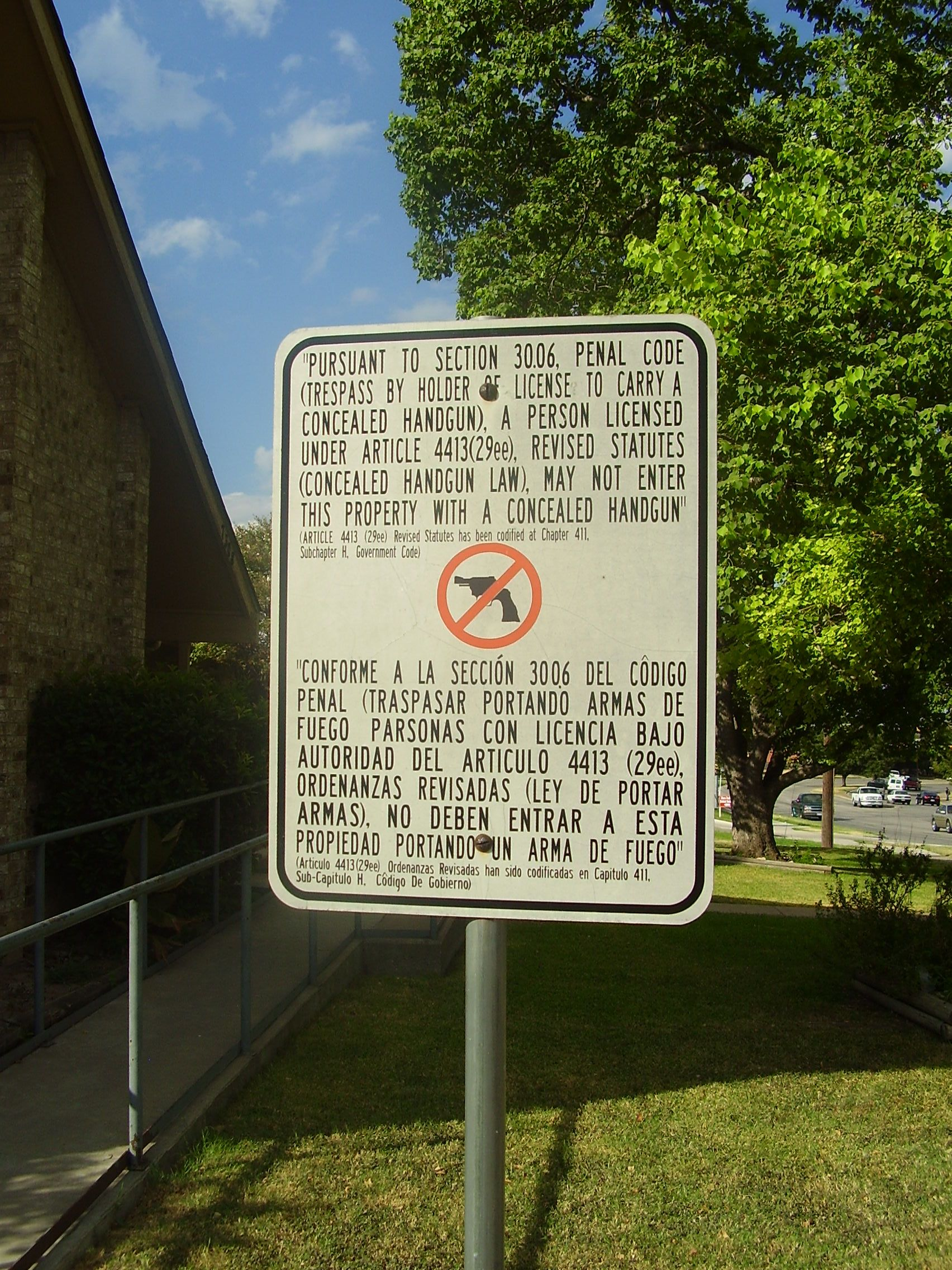
A notice stating that the Turman Halfway House in Austin, Texas prohibits concealed handguns. This sign uses obsolete wording in font smaller than required, and is no longer enforceable under current law.

TPC section 30.06 covers "Trespass by a person licensed to carry a concealed handgun". It allows a residential or commercial landowner to post signage that preemptively bars licensed persons from entering the premises while carrying concealed. As of January 1, 2016, the charge for failing to heed signage has been reduced from a Class A misdemeanor to a Class C misdemeanor, unless it can be shown at trial that the actor was given oral notice and failed to depart, in which case it remains a Class A misdemeanor. This is a significant difference, in that conviction of a Class A or B misdemeanor will result in the loss of one's handgun license for at least 5 years; this is not the case if convicted of a Class C misdemeanor. As of September 1, 2019, it is a defense to prosecution if oral notice was given to the license holder regarding the signage and they promptly depart.

Signs posted in compliance with TPC 30.06 are colloquially called "30.06 signs" or "30.06 signage".

- The courts have yet to rule on any specific requirements of 30.06, but LTC permittees are generally instructed that signage which does not comply exactly with TPC Sec. 30.06(c)(3)(B) is not binding. The law states a compliant sign must be:
  - In contrasting colors;
  - With block letters;
  - Having text 1" or greater in height;
  - Containing "identical" text to the following:
    - Pursuant to Section 30.06, Penal Code (trespass by license holder with a concealed handgun), a person licensed under Subchapter H, Chapter 411, Government Code (handgun licensing law), may not enter this property with a concealed handgun.
  - In both English and Spanish;
  - Posted conspicuously and "clearly visible to the public".

Hospitals are a gray area due to conflicts in the law and multiple provisions that may apply to a medical facility:

License holders were originally prohibited from carrying concealed inside a hospital without written authorization, under TPS 46.035(b)(4). An amendment in 2007 added paragraph (i) to the same section, stating that (b)(4) the prohibition does not apply if the license holder did not receive notice (oral or written communication, including posting of a sign, under TPC 30.06) of the prohibition. But, a hospital may be a "teaching hospital" and considered a school, where firearms carry is prohibited, under TPC 46.03(a)(1). It may also be a VA or military hospital, and thus subject to federal prohibition on weapons carry. All hospitals are required under Government Code Section 411.204(b) to post a sign stating that possession of a handgun whether licensed or not is a felony. It is unknown, given the amendments to 46.035, whether the GC 411.204 signage would actually prohibit a CHL holder from carrying, as it would not constitute "effective notice under section 30.06" and GC 411.204 does not describe failure to heed such a sign as an offense by the license holder.

Anyone who owns or controls property may orally or in writing, inform a person carrying a concealed handgun that they must leave the property. Establishments that choose not to post such signs have protection from civil liability.

=== Open carry ===
Per House Bill 1927 signed into law by Gov. Abbott, open carry is fully legal for anyone over 21 years of age since September 1, 2021. Known by supporters as "constitutional carry", House Bill 1927 allows Texans 21 and over to carry handguns – openly or concealed – without obtaining a state-issued license, so long they are not excluded from possessing a firearm by another federal or state law.

Prior to House Bill 1927, holders of a Texas CHL or LTC are able to openly carry handguns in the same places that allow concealed carry with some exceptions. Openly carried handguns must be in a holster.

Existing CHL holders may continue to carry with a valid license. New applicants will be required to complete training on the use of restraint holsters and methods to ensure the secure carry of openly carried handguns.

Exceptions:

- Open carry is not permitted on the premises of a public institution of higher education or on the premises of a private or independent institution of higher education.
- Open carry is not permitted on any public or private driveway, street, sidewalk or walkway, parking lot, parking garage or other parking area of an institution of higher education or private or independent institution of higher education.
- Open carry is not permitted by an individual who is acting as a personal protection officer under Chapter 1702 Texas Occupations Code unless they are wearing a uniform and is engaged in the exclusive performance of the officer's duties.

==== 30.07 signage ====
This law took effect January 1, 2016, and covers the new open carry law. Section 30.07 is substantially similar to Section 30.06 which covers concealed carry.

TPC section 30.07 covers "Trespass by license holder with an openly carried handgun". This allows a residential or commercial landowner to post signage that preemptively bars licensed persons from entering the premises while openly carrying a handgun. An offense under section 30.07 is a Class C misdemeanor, unless it is shown at trial that the actor was given oral notice and failed to depart, in which case the offense is a Class A misdemeanor. The 30.07 sign differs from the 30.06 sign in that it must be displayed at each entrance to the property. In both cases the sign must be "clearly visible to the public". As of September 1, 2019, it is a defense to prosecution if oral notice was given to the license holder regarding the signage and they promptly depart.

The law states that notice may be given orally by the owner of the property, or someone with apparent authority to act for the owner, or by written communication.

Written communication consists of a card or other document consisting the 30.07 language below, or a sign posted on the property.

Both written communication and a posted sign must contain language identical to the following (30.07 notice):

Pursuant to section 30.07, Penal Code (trespass by license holder with an openly carried handgun), a person licensed under Subchapter H, Chapter 411, Government Code (handgun licensing law), may not enter this property with a handgun that is carried openly

Additionally, signs posted on the property must conform to the following regulations:

- Must include the 30.07 notice above in both English and Spanish
- Must appear in contrasting colors
- Must be in block letters at least one inch in height
- Must be "displayed in a conspicuous manner clearly visible to the public at each entrance to the property"

Establishments that choose not to post such signs have protection from civil liability.

== Castle doctrine ==
On March 27, 2007, Governor Rick Perry signed Senate Bill 378 into law, making Texas a "Castle Doctrine" state which came into effect September 1, 2007. Residents lawfully occupying a dwelling may use deadly force against a person who "unlawfully, and with force, enters or attempts to enter the dwelling", or who unlawfully and with force removes or attempts to remove someone from that dwelling, or who commits or attempts to commit a "qualifying" felony such as "aggravated kidnapping, murder, sexual assault, aggravated sexual assault, robbery, or aggravated robbery" (TPC 9.32(b)).

=== Stand Your Ground ===
Senate Bill 378 also contains a "Stand Your Ground" clause; A person who has a legal right to be wherever he/she is at the time of a defensive shooting has no "duty to retreat" before being justified in shooting. The "trier of fact" (the jury in a jury trial, otherwise the judge) may not consider whether the person retreated when deciding whether the person was justified in shooting (TPC 9.32(c,d)).

=== Civil immunity ===
In addition, two statutes of the Texas Civil Practice and Remedies Code protect people who justifiably threaten or use deadly force. Chapter 86 prohibits a person convicted of a misdemeanor or felony from filing suit to recover any damages suffered as a result of the criminal act or any justifiable action taken by others to prevent the criminal act or to apprehend the person, including the firing of a weapon. Chapter 83 of the same code states that a person who used force or deadly force against an individual that is justified under TPC Chapter 9 is immune from liability for personal injury or death of the individual against whom the force was used. This does not relieve a person from liability for use of force or deadly force on someone against whom the force would not be justified, such as a bystander hit by an errant shot.

This law does not prevent a person from being sued for using deadly force. The civil court will determine if the defendant was justified under chapter 9 of the Penal Code, however the civil court will be generally bound at common law by the previous determinations of a criminal court under the principles of res judicata and Stare decisis, in so far as those legal doctrines will apply to the case.

== Motorists Protection Act ==
Gov. Perry also signed H.B. 1815 after passage by the 2007 Legislature, a bill that allows any person to carry a handgun in the person's motor vehicle without a CHL or other permit. The bill revised Chapter 46, Section 2 of the Penal Code to state that it is in fact not "Unlawful Carry of a Weapon", as defined by the statute, for a person to carry a handgun while in a motor vehicle they own or control, or to carry while heading directly from the person's home to that car. However, lawful carry while in a vehicle requires these four critical qualifiers: (1) the weapon must not be in plain sight (in Texas law, "plain sight" and "concealed" are mutually exclusive opposing terms); (2) the carrier cannot be involved in criminal activities, other than Class C traffic misdemeanors; (3) the carrier cannot be prohibited by state or federal law from possessing a firearm; and (4) the carrier cannot be a member of a criminal gang. Now a handgun can be carried openly or concealed without a permit in a vehicle, but if carried openly the handgun must be in a holster.

Previous legislation (H.B. 823) enacted in the 2005 session of the legislature had modified TPC 46.15 ("Non-Applicability") to include the "traveller assumption"; a law enforcement officer who encounters a firearm in a vehicle was required to presume that the driver of that vehicle was "travelling" under a pre-existing provision of 46.15, and thus the Unlawful Carry statute did not apply, absent evidence that the person was engaged in criminal activity, a member of a gang, or prohibited from possessing a firearm. However, attorneys and law enforcement officials in several municipalities including DA Chuck Rosenthal of Houston stated that they would continue to prosecute individuals found transporting firearms in their vehicles despite this presumption, leading to the more forceful statement of non-applicability in the 2007 H.B. 1815.

== National Firearms Act ==
Possession of explosive weapons, machine guns, and short-barrel firearms is permitted by Texas law as long as the owner has registered the item in the NFA registry. As of September 1, 2021, Texas law exempts from federal law suppressors manufactured within the state and that remain in the state, and prohibits the state from enforcing federal law against suppressors. Federal agents could, however, still try to enforce federal law.

== State preemption of local laws ==
Certain local preemptions exist within the state of Texas which prohibit city or county governments from passing ordinances further restricting the lawful carrying of handguns in certain instances beyond that of state law.

In 2015, the legislature passed penal code 411.209 which prohibited an agency or political subdivision from excluding from government property any concealed handgun license holder from carrying a gun unless firearms are prohibited on the premises by state law.

Furthermore, Texas penal code 235.023 states the commissioner's court of a county (i.e. county legislative body) is not authorized to regulate the transfer, ownership, possession, or transportation of firearms or require the registration of firearms

More general prohibitions on restrictions on the sale, transfer, ownership, possession, etc. of firearms and knives under local law are listed under Local Government Code Title 7, Subtitle A, Chapter 229, Subchapter A.

Further Attorney General decisions also exist. For example, in August 1995 under DM-0364, Attorney General Dan Morales passed an opinion that municipalities are prohibited from regulating the carrying of concealed handguns in city parks by persons licensed to carry a handgun: "we believe that a municipality does not have the power to prohibit licensees from carrying handguns in city parks but that a county does have such power over county parks".

Dan Morales also held that municipal housing authorities are subject to the preemption statute and this precludes authorities from adopting a regulation to evict a tenant for the otherwise legal possession of a firearm. Tenant protection was codified into law in 2019 by prohibiting lease contracts from including firearm prohibition clauses.

In 2019, as a result of an inquiry regarding local regulations that "(1) prohibit firearm and ammunition sales within 1,000 feet of any school or church; (2) restrict the location of a business that sells guns or ammunition to the highest-density commercial areas; and (3) prohibit gun shops from locating within 200 feet of schools, public parks, or places of worship", the Attorney General opined that "a regulation that expressly prohibits gun stores from operating in a specific area relates to the transfer of firearms and is prohibited by subsection 229.00I(a)(1). Similarly, an ordinance singling out firearm and ammunition sales relates to the transfer of firearms and is therefore prohibited."

Preemption was further strengthened in 2019. Property owners' associations may not prohibit guns.

Some counties have adopted Second Amendment sanctuary resolutions. A statewide sanctuary law was also passed.

== See also ==
- Gun violence and gun control in Texas
- Law of Texas
