= Dallas shooting =

Dallas shooting or Dallas police shooting may refer to:

- Assassination of John F. Kennedy, U.S. President, on November 22, 1963
- 1984 Dallas nightclub shooting, in which six people were killed at a nightclub
- 2001 Dallas shootings, in which two people were killed
- 2015 attack on Dallas police, in which officers were not harmed
- 2016 shooting of Dallas police officers, in which five officers were killed and eleven other people wounded
- Murder of Botham Jean, in which a Black man was murdered by a police officer
- 2019 Dallas courthouse shooting, in which the gunman was killed and a civilian slightly wounded while taking cover
- Methodist Dallas Medical Center shooting, in which two hospital employees were killed
- 2025 Dallas ICE facility shooting, in which two ICE detainees were killed

== See also ==
- List of shootings in Texas
