= Methodist Dallas Medical Center shooting =

Shooting in Dallas, Texas

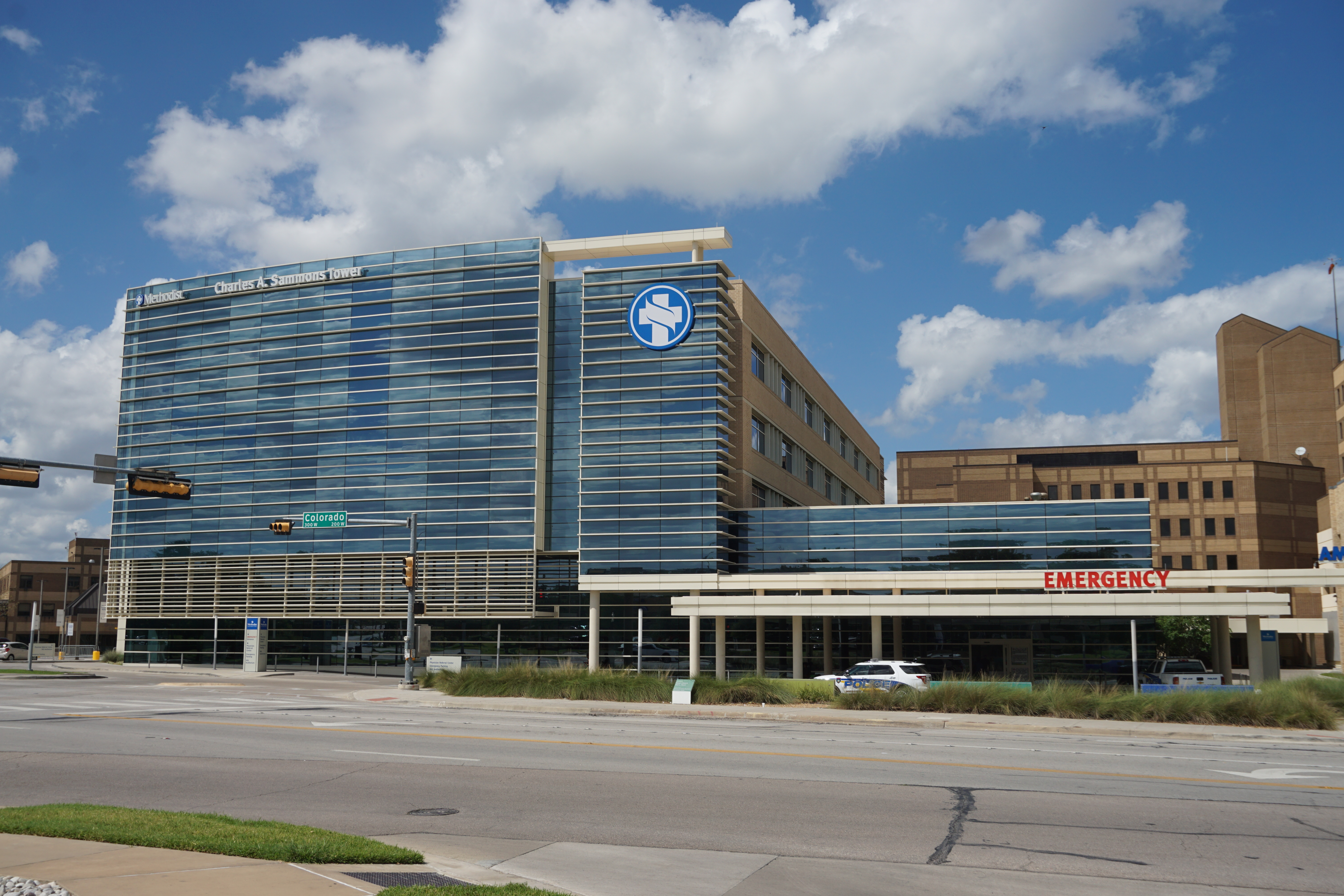
- The Medical Center seen in September 2016
- Location: 32°45′40″N 96°49′30″W; Dallas, Texas, U.S.
- Date: October 22, 2022
- Attack type: Shooting
- Deaths: 2
- Injuries: 2 (Note: Including the assailant; One by gunfire)
- Perpetrator: Nestor Oswaldo Hernandez

On October 22, 2022, a shooting occurred on the fourth floor of the Methodist Dallas Medical Center in Dallas, Texas, resulting in two deaths. At the scene police arrested Nestor Oswaldo Hernandez from North Dallas, a 30-year-old parolee, and subsequently took him into custody. He was charged with capital murder related to the two deaths, and was sentenced to life in prison in 2023.

== Investigation ==
A possible motive behind the shooting police have stated was that Hernandez, who was granted permission to be at the hospital to see his girlfriend give birth, according to the Texas Department of Criminal Justice, then accused her of cheating on him and pistol-whipped her in the face. He then allegedly said that "whoever comes in this room is going to die with us". The two killed, Katie Annette Flowers, 63, an employed nurse, and Jacqueline Ama Pokuaa, 45, a social worker, were reportedly killed when they got too close to Hernandez. Hernandez reloaded his gun and started to leave the room, but a Methodist police officer shot Hernandez in the leg, causing him to retreat. Hernandez surrendered after a brief standoff. After receiving initial treatment for his injuries at Methodist, Hernandez was later transferred to another hospital. Dallas police have most recently released surveillance video of the suspect during the shooting.

== Perpetrator ==
Nestor Oswaldo Hernandez (born August 1, 1992), a 30-year-old local man, was arrested at the scene after being wounded in a shootout with police. He was held on $3,000,000 bond.

Hernandez, a local of Dallas who had briefly attended W.T. White High School in North Dallas of the Dallas Independent School District, had a lengthy criminal record; in 2009 he was convicted of assault on a public servant, in 2011 he entered a guilty plea to a felony charge of robbery, and in 2015 he was convicted of aggravated robbery. In the latter case, Hernandez and an accomplice named Selena Villatoro assaulted a woman who was returning to her apartment from work and taped her hands together and wrapped tape over her eyes. According to the official indictment, Hernandez exclaimed to the woman "Don't scream or I'll kill you!" and demanded that she open the door to her apartment. When she obliged, they beat her and took her cell phone, car, and $3,000 of her money. As a result of this the victim sustained a nasal fracture and a fractured eye. Hernandez and Villatoro were arrested on January 17, 2015. Hernanadez was sentenced to eight years in prison for the attack. He was paroled on October 20, 2021, after completing 80% of his sentence.

On March 9, 2022, Hernandez was detained for a parole violation in Dallas, which was stated to have been the result of a "minor accident investigation". On June 17 he was detained in the city of Carrollton for tearing off his ankle monitor. As a result of the back-to-back violations his case was presented to the state parole board, and the panel agreed to re-incarcerate him. Hernandez spent 100 days in the county jail and the state's Intermediate Sanction Facility before he was released.

Due to Hernandez' criminal history and repeat offences, there was immediate criticism towards the Texas Board of Pardons and Paroles.

On November 9, 2023, Hernandez was sentenced to life without parole. As of 2025, Hernandez is incarcerated at the Preston E. Smith Unit in Lamesa, Texas.

== See also ==
- Gun violence in Texas
- 2022 Tulsa hospital shooting
