= Texas Highway Patrol =

U.S. state law enforcement agency

- Texas Highway Patrol Crest

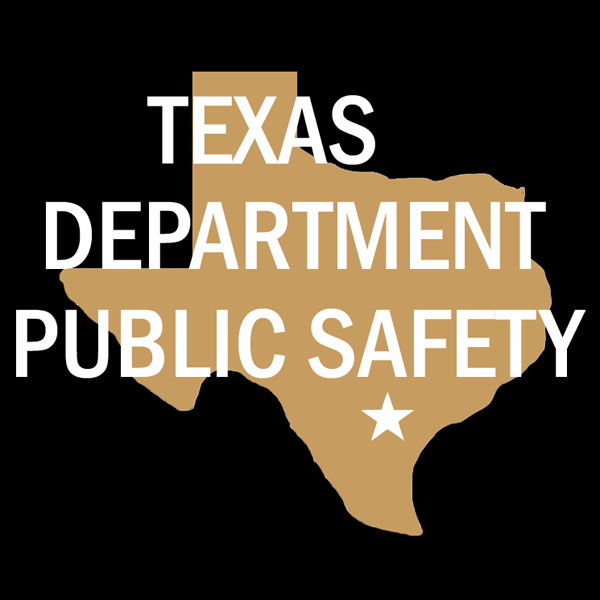
- Texas Highway Patrol Door Seal

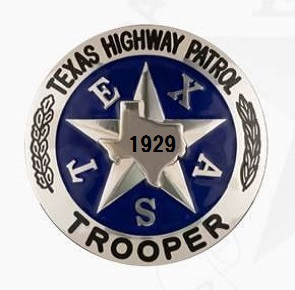
- Texas Highway Patrol Badge

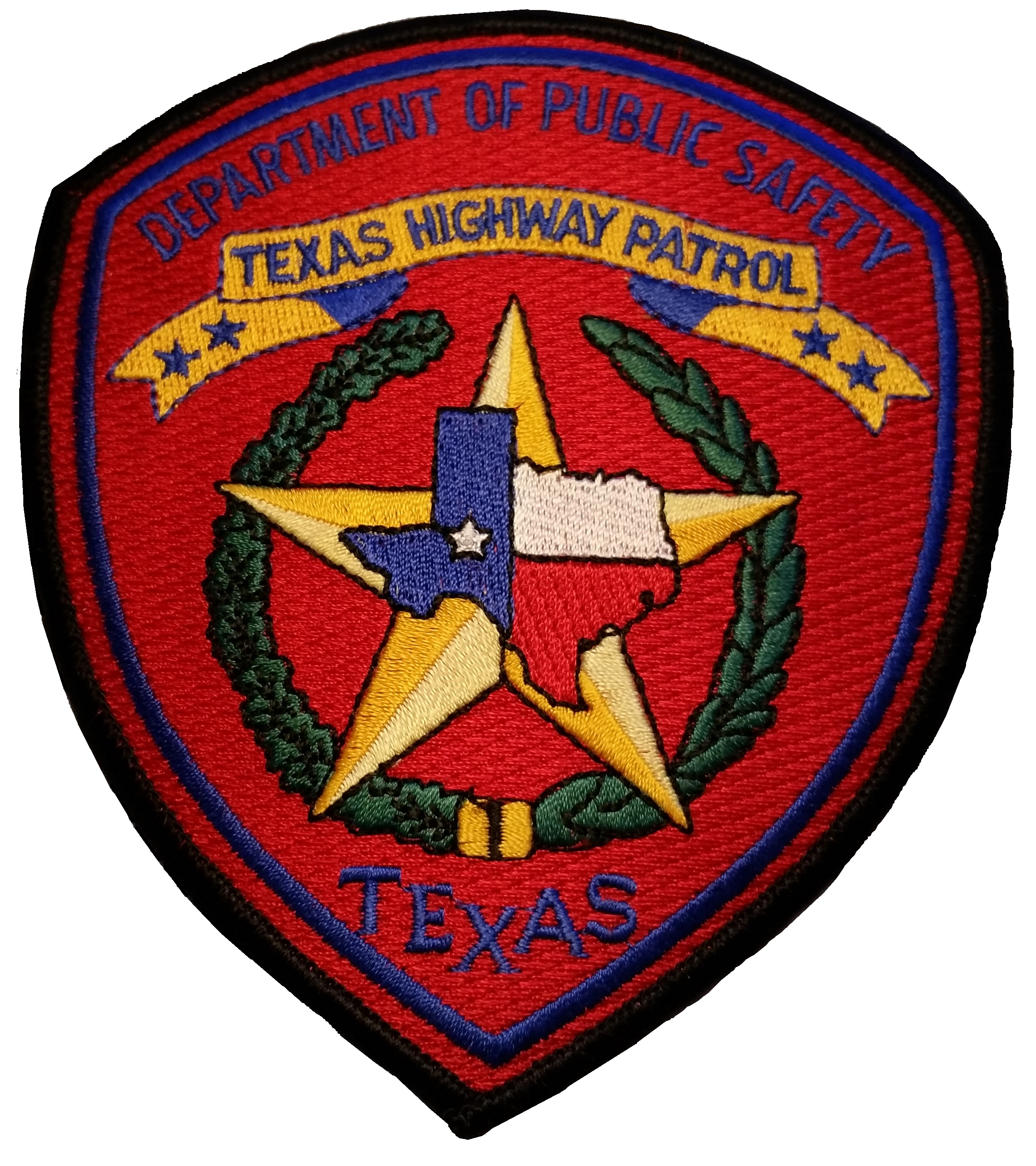
- Texas Highway Patrol Patch
- Abbreviation: THP/TxDPS
- Motto: Courtesy, Service, Protection

Agency overview
- Formed: 1929; 97 years ago
- Preceding agency: Texas Highway Motor Patrol

Jurisdictional structure
- Operations jurisdiction: Texas, U.S.
- Area: 261,797 square miles (678,050 km^{2})
- Population: 29,360,759 (2020)
- Legal jurisdiction: State of Texas
- General nature: Civilian police

Operational structure
- Headquarters: Austin, Texas
- Troopers: 3,500 (actual, as of 2025)
- Agency executive: Freeman F. Martin
- Parent agency: Texas Department of Public Safety
- Regions: 7
- Districts: 19

The Texas Highway Patrol is a division of the Texas Department of Public Safety and is the largest state-level law enforcement agency in the U.S. state of Texas. The patrol's primary duties are enforcement of state traffic laws and commercial vehicle regulation, but it is a fully empowered police agency with authority to enforce criminal law anywhere in the state. Also, they respond to emergencies on Texas’s highways. Highway patrol troopers are also responsible for patrolling the state Capitol Complex in Austin and providing security to the governor. The current Chief is Colonel Freeman F. Martin.

The highway patrol was founded in 1929 as the Highway Motor Patrol, the first statewide law enforcement agency in Texas since the establishment of the Texas Rangers in 1823, and the first such force to be uniformed and regularly trained. Since 1935, the agency has operated under its current name. Since its inception with just 60 officers, then known as "inspectors", the Texas Highway Patrol has grown to meet the increasing volume of vehicular traffic on Texas roads, modern security threats, and the requirements of twenty-first century policing, currently employing over 2,800 sworn troopers.

The Texas Department of Public Safety (DPS), and by extension the Highway Patrol, is Texas's de facto state police.

== History ==
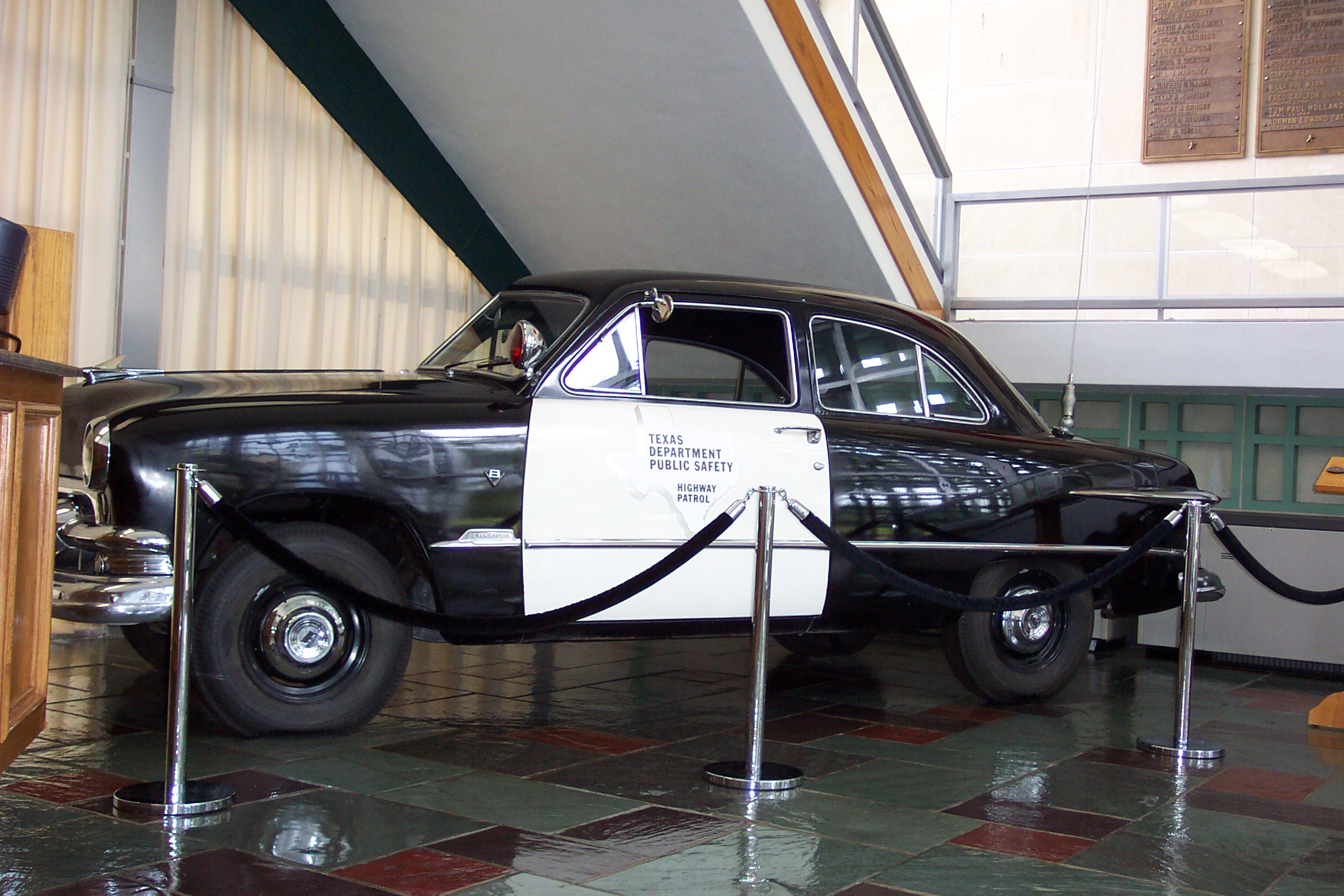
Texas Highway Patrol car, circa 1953

Early law enforcement in Texas began with the establishment of the Texas Rangers in 1823 by Stephen F. Austin. The Rangers were originally formed to protect American settlers from Indian attacks, and over the years transformed into a paramilitary force. Rangers fought in the Texas Revolution, Mexican–American War, and Civil War. They quickly developed an international reputation for their exploits and perceived fearlessness (Mexican soldiers nicknamed them "Texas Devils" for their scouting and fighting abilities). From 1823 to 1845, they were a territorial force made up of volunteers charged with fighting Native Americans, guarding the Mexican border, and capturing thieves, murderers, and other criminals, occasionally by controversial methods. Nonetheless, it was not until the latter stages of the 19th century and the Texas cattle boom that the Rangers took on a law enforcement, rather than frontier militia, role. The Rangers faced new challenges as population increase. Their focused moved from defending outside threats to maintaining order within the communities. As more people were in need of courts, sheriffs, and police force the Rangers were positioned into the law enforcement. In 1935, the Rangers were moved under the Texas Department of Public Safety.

From 1845 (when Texas was annexed by the United States) until the early 20th century, the Rangers were the only form of state law enforcement available. The force was temporarily disbanded by the federal government after the Civil War, and replaced with the short-lived Texas State Police. This agency lasted only three years before the Texas Rangers were reorganized. Until the introduction of the automobile, they remained the only state criminal law enforcement agency in Texas.

The Texas Highway Patrol was established in 1929 as the Texas Highway Motor Patrol, tasked with enforcing traffic laws on Texas roads. The original force was made up of about 60 officers who patrolled on motorcycles, often in pairs. Because of this, it was not uncommon for troopers to drive criminals to jail in the offenders' own cars, then return later for the motorcycle left on the side of the road. When the Texas Department of Public Safety was formed in 1935, the Highway Motor Patrol was transferred into that department and was renamed the Texas Highway Patrol. The use of motorcycles was phased out after World War II, and cars became troopers' main mode of transportation. Two-way radio and teletype were also added in the late 1940s, allowing troopers to communicate with regional dispatch centers. The Aviation Unit was established in 1949 with the purchase of a single-engine aircraft based in Austin.

The 1960s saw some advances in technology, such as radar speed detection. Nevertheless, troopers' work was still mostly based on instinct and visual detection, and was often very hazardous. High-speed pursuits of bootleggers were common, and troopers were required to act as "storm chasers" for the National Weather Service because of the limited weather radar at the time. Motorcycles were introduced again in the 1970s, but the idea was quickly abandoned when the bikes proved unreliable.

Modern troopers use highly sophisticated technology to conduct their duties. GPS lets regional dispatch centers identify a patrol unit's exact location, and in-car computers (Mobile Data Terminals) allow troopers to receive knowledge of a person's background before ever approaching a vehicle. Troopers are increasingly armed with less-lethal weaponry, such as Tasers. The highway patrol was also one of the first agencies in Texas to use digital citation printers en masse. These systems, mounted in the patrol car, allow traffic citations to be largely completed by scanning an offender's identification card into the Mobile Data Terminal. This innovation allows for quicker ticket writing and more legible citations.

As of 2021, the Texas Highway Patrol employs 2,802 sworn troopers; this is an increase of almost 30% from the 2,162 troopers employed in 2014. Despite the size of the highway patrol and its unique name and function, however, many Texans refer to troopers simply as "DPS", referencing the THP's parent agency. Some are unaware that an entity by the name of "Texas Highway Patrol" even exists, or is distinct from its parent.

== Organization ==
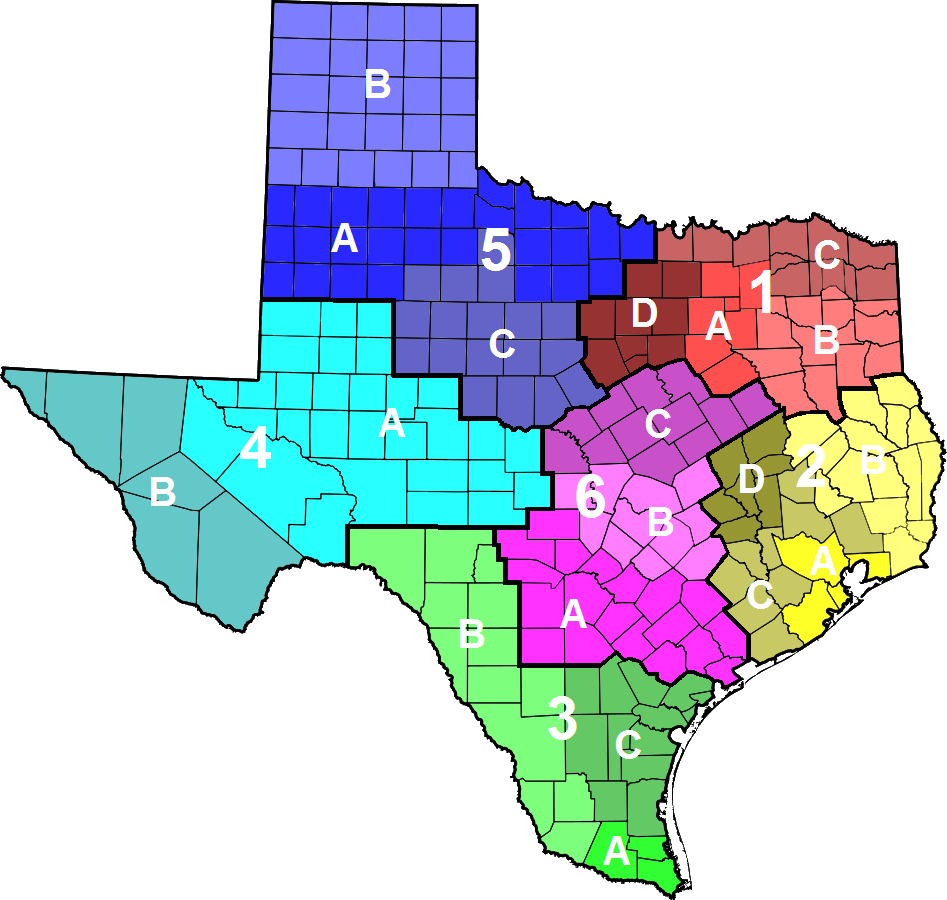
THP regions and districts

The Texas Highway Patrol is divided into seven regions and nineteen districts. Historically, these regions were numbered I-VII, but were assigned geographic nomenclature in 2018 in order to facilitate easier identification by the public.

- North Texas Region: Garland

District A: Dallas
District B: Tyler
District C: Mount Pleasant
District D: Hurst

- Southeast Texas Region: Houston

District A: Houston
District B: Beaumont
District C: Conroe
District D: Bryan

- South Texas Region: McAllen

District A: Weslaco
District B: Laredo
District C: Corpus Christi
District D: McAllen

- West Texas Region: El Paso

District A: Midland
District B: El Paso

- Northwest Texas Region: Lubbock

District A: Lubbock
District B: Amarillo
District C: Abilene

- Central Texas Region: San Antonio

District A: San Antonio
District B: Austin
District C: Waco

- Capitol Region: Austin

Further division is complex. Districts are divided into two or three sub-districts, each overseen by one or more lieutenants. These are then divided even further into patrol areas encompassing one or two counties, depending on size and population; troopers are assigned to specific counties. Sergeants are responsible for these patrol areas. Captains oversee districts, and majors oversee regions.

== Training ==
Trainees are housed at DPS headquarters in Austin and receive training both there and at the department’s Tactical Training Center in Williamson County, north of Austin. Academies are paramilitary in nature and are physically and mentally demanding. Academies are styled as Class A/B-(Year), and last approximately 29 weeks. On average, two academies are held per year; this number can be altered by the Texas DPS director as necessary, and has been as high as four per year as recently as 2017. Hands-on material covered includes weapons training, crash investigation, arrest and control tactics, pursuit driving, and intense physical readiness. Classroom study, such as fraudulent document recognition and legal and ethics code study, also plays a large role in trainees' training. Due to the difficult nature of the academy, some classes have graduated fewer than 20% of the starting number. Class A-2021, which graduated July 30, 2021, was the largest academy in THP history, with 145 trainees ultimately being commissioned.

Trainees are allowed to select a duty assignment from a list of available stations throughout the state, although Texas Highway Patrol makes the ultimate decision on troopers' stations. Priority in assigning posts is typically given to married trainees, but most trainees nonetheless receive their requested assignments. Troopers are typically allowed to request a station transfer after one year of satisfactory service. With the creation of 250 new authorized assignments along the Texas-Mexico border in 2017, many of them in remote locations such as Sanderson, Marfa, and Pecos, it has since become routine for the majority of new Troopers to be assigned to border stations, replacing predecessors who had likewise been stationed there upon graduating the academy and then transferred after one year.

== Duties ==
Texas state troopers perform a number of law enforcement duties and tasks:

- Enforce state traffic laws by patrolling the highways and issuing warnings or citations to violators.
- Provide statewide criminal law enforcement, especially in rural areas where local police are limited.
- Respond to, investigate, and report traffic crashes in rural areas.
- Provide security to the state capitol complex and governor.
- Inspect commercial vehicles for load and driver fatigue violations.
- Assist other DPS divisions with felony investigations, such as narcotics smuggling.
- Educate citizens on traffic safety practices such as child safety seats and proper vehicle maintenance.
- Participate in selective specialized units, such as regional SWAT teams, marine patrol, and dive recovery.

=== Variation, Specialization, and Changes ===
==== General Law Enforcement ====
Although the highway patrol's primary task is enforcement of state traffic laws, many remote areas of the state require troopers to serve general policing duties because of limited local law enforcement. These duties may include responding to civilian calls for service, serving warrants, patrolling the U.S.-Mexico border, conducting investigations, and other responsibilities.

In other areas, troopers provide assistance to other law enforcement agencies, such as United States Customs and Border Protection, Texas State Game Wardens, and various local and county police entities.

Notwithstanding these duties, the Texas Administrative Code (which codifies operations of state agencies) officially considers traffic patrol and crash investigation in rural, unincorporated areas the priority of the highway patrol.

==== Special Units ====
- Tactical Marine: Consists of six armed patrol vessels used to interdict drug traffickers and human smugglers along the Rio Grande and combat violent Mexican drug cartels
- The Special Weapons and Tactics Team (SWAT): The SWAT headquarter is located in Austin. It is a highly trained team who responds to nationwide critical incidents in high risk environments such as active shootings and hostage situations.
- Explosive Ordinance Disposal: This team is to respond to and dispose of bomb threats that are unsafe and harmful to the public.
- Bicycle Patrol: The Bicycle Patrol Unit operates within the Capitol Region. Its mission is to take a proactive stance in deterring criminal activity; traffic enforcement through arrests, citations, and written warnings; educate the public in traffic and crime prevention; and apply community policing concepts to those working in and visiting the State Capitol Complex.
- Motor Unit: The unit began as an experiment in July 2011; now a fully functioning unit with Troopers assigned to the State Capitol Complex. The Motor Unit is responsible for assignments such as crime suppression, tactical operations, community engagements, traffic control, and escorts.
- Mounted Horse Patrol: The unit was established in 2014 to patrol the State Capitol Complex. The mission of the MHPU is to enhance community policing efforts by providing a positive interaction for those visiting the Capitol Complex. The unit also provides a highly visible and effective patrol and security function in suppressing civil disturbances, as well as deterring terrorism and criminal activity.
- Dive Recovery: Consists of several SCUBA-certified troopers from throughout the state who specialize in recovering evidence, deceased persons, and other items from waterways and lakes
- Special Response Teams: Specially trained tactical teams based in each highway patrol region, troopers and criminal investigators serve high-risk warrants and assist in hostage and barricaded subject scenarios
- K-9: Consists of several troopers throughout the state who handle dogs trained to detect illegal substances and apprehend dangerous fugitives

=== Border Operations ===
==== Operation Strong Safety ====
From 2014 to 2017, the Texas Highway Patrol participated in Operation Strong Safety, a program intended to increase law enforcement along the Texas-Mexico border. The patrol's role in Operation Strong Safety (OSS) was to deploy large numbers of troopers to the border in order to add an increased deterrent to drug traffickers and human smugglers. The plan called for troopers from across the state to serve approximately one week each patrolling border counties, particularly in South Texas; deployments rotated constantly to maintain a steady presence along the border. OSS was the successor to previous similar efforts, such as Operation Border Star, and was approved by the Texas Legislature with an $800 million price tag.

These deployments of large numbers of troopers were criticized by some. Many troopers complained about participating in the operation, and others were injured during pursuits and struggles with Mexican cartels. Between January 2005 and June 2009, Hidalgo County troopers were involved in 656 vehicle pursuits - 30 times the average for troopers in other counties - with only about 40% of suspects being apprehended. Some experts also questioned the patrol's aggressive pursuit tactics, which often involve shooting out the tires of fleeing vehicles and performing roadblock techniques. Controversy about the role of firearms in pursuits arose in October 2012 after a THP sharpshooter in a helicopter opened fire on a suspected drug smuggler, accidentally killing two illegal immigrants who were concealed within the vehicle.

In 2015, the Dallas Morning News reported that the constant rotation of troopers from across the state to the border appeared to be responsible for a significant drop in DPS productivity elsewhere in Texas. Highway Patrol troopers reportedly wrote 14% fewer traffic citations in 2014 than in 2013; this and other statistics, such as a 25% decrease in arrests made by Texas Rangers, led the newspaper to conclude that the temporary removal of troopers and other state law enforcement officers from posts around the state was having a detrimental effect on overall DPS service. The agency has sought to control this issue by increasing the number of troopers and agents permanently assigned to the border.

Despite some criticism, Operation Strong Safety and similar efforts have seen several large seizures of illegal drugs being trafficked from Mexico. In many cases, seizures of drug profits and weapons being transported south across the border have also been recovered, along with numerous vehicles, many of them stolen. Law enforcement presence in many border counties has dramatically increased as well. Hidalgo County, for example, tripled its DPS station from 20 to 60 permanently assigned troopers during Operation Border Star, the predecessor to OSS; this number has since risen to over 90. No troopers or other DPS officers have been killed while participating in the operations. Texas DPS announced it was no longer rotating troopers to the border in September 2017.

==== Operation Lone Star ====
In March 2021, Texas Governor Greg Abbott announced the commencement of Operation Lone Star, a DPS initiative to combat human and narcotics trafficking on the Texas border with Mexico. The operation, which is ongoing as of January 2026 and has no set end date, involves deployment of approximately 1,000 Texas DPS personnel, Texas National Guardsmen, and law enforcement from other states to the Mexican border in response to record numbers of illegal crossings. Within two months of the start of Operation Lone Star, DPS reported that its troopers and agents had made over 600 criminal apprehensions - including a DPS Top 10 Most Wanted fugitive - and referred over 24,000 illegal migrants to the U.S. Border Patrol; by late July 2021, arrests stood at 3,400 and immigrant referrals at 53,000. According to one media source, troopers assigned to Operation Lone Star have occasionally been required to work 14-hour shifts for as many as 15 days in a row.

Operation Lone Star quickly stirred political controversy and criticisms similar to Operation Strong Safety: in some areas, local law enforcement acknowledged they were having to adjust their staffing in order to compensate for a lack of Highway Patrol troopers in their area, and the U.S. Justice Department threatened in July 2021 to sue the State of Texas over some elements of the operation. The Texas Tribune criticized Abbott's instruction that troopers arrest illegal migrants on state charges such as trespassing, and some South Texas residents expressed concern that the influx of troopers would lead to an increase in traffic stops of locals.

=== Dallas crime suppression ===
In May 2019, Texas Governor Greg Abbott ordered the deployment of dozens of Highway Patrol troopers to South Dallas in response to a sharp rise in crime there. The troopers' responsibilities were to augment and assist the Dallas Police Department in order to reduce violent crime in south Dallas. In August 2019, Dallas Police reported a 29% reduction in violent crime in the areas where troopers were deployed, citing over 1,000 arrests and 12,500 traffic stops made by troopers. Some local politicians and Dallas residents, however, voiced concerns about the efficacy of the troopers' presence, and some critics argued that the crime reduction cited by Dallas Police was not as significant as that agency portrayed it to be. Some residents requested that troopers be withdrawn from Dallas entirely, or re-deployed to other parts of the city, complaining about the troopers' aggressive traffic enforcement in predominantly black and Latino neighborhoods. DPS claimed that its original agreement with Dallas Police was indeed to conduct primarily traffic enforcement, in order to allow Dallas officers to focus on combatting violent crime directly. The operation officially ended on September 1, 2019, although some South Dallas residents asked the Dallas Police Department in January 2020 about the possibility of troopers returning to the city, mainly in response to concerns about street racing and spontaneous gunfire.

Controversy stemming from the operation arose in August 2019 when two troopers assigned to patrol South Dallas fatally shot 27-year-old Schaston Hodge after a short pursuit. The troopers initially attempted to pull over Hodge for failing to signal a turn, but Hodge did not stop and led the troopers on a brief chase before pulling into his grandmother’s driveway. Body-worn camera footage released by the Texas DPS in January 2020 showed Hodge aiming a pistol at the troopers before being shot 16 times. The troopers attempted to render first aid to Hodge, but he did not survive. In November 2019, a grand jury declined to indict either trooper.

==== 2025 Incident at Texas A&M Game ====
During a Texas A&M football game on November 15, 2025, a state trooper was relieved of game day duties following an incident involving South Carolina Gamecocks wide receiver Nyck Harbor after he scored an 85 yard touchdown. The incident is currently under investigation.

== Statistics ==
=== General ===
- As of 2016, the Highway Patrol is made up of 2,863 commissioned troopers, up from 2,162 in 2014.
- Among 49 state police agencies nationwide, Texas has one of the lowest proportions of troopers to population of any state. With approximately 11 troopers per 100,000 residents, the Texas Highway Patrol falls well below the national average of 23 per 100,000.
- Texas DPS Academy Class A-2019 graduated 87 probationary troopers on August 9, 2019.
- Between 2017 and 2019, the Highway Patrol commissioned 746 new troopers in 8 academy sessions, of whom 274 (36%) were military veterans and 151 (20%) had prior law enforcement experience.

=== Activities ===
- Between 2001 and 2013, the Highway Patrol made 35,803,978 traffic stops, resulting in 12,846,418 citations and 20,983,777 warnings issued
- In 2016, troopers made 42,779 misdemeanor and 11,392 felony arrests statewide
- In 2018, troopers investigated 75,030 traffic crashes, accounting for roughly 14% of all crashes in the state

== Uniforms ==
Texas state troopers wear dark tan uniforms, known affectionately by troopers as "Texas Tan." Full-length pants with a blue stripe and red piping are worn at all times; epaulettes on the shirt are similarly patterned. A black patent leather gun belt is worn with a silver buckle, along with matching leather holsters and pouches. Badges are reminiscent of the Texas Rangers' famous "star-in-a-wheel" badge, though featuring a solid blue field behind the star. The badge number is prominently displayed in black in the center of the star. Shoulder patches, worn on either sleeve, are predominantly red in color and feature the Texas Highway Patrol crest.

Troopers' headwear is unique in that instead of the peaked caps or campaign hats popular with other agencies, cowboy hats are worn with the duty uniform. Felt hats are worn in colder weather and straw hats are worn in warmer weather. Dress uniforms are similar to the patrol uniform, with the addition of a blue tie, long-sleeved shirt and black cowboy boots. Dress for various ceremonial units adds white gloves, a white ascot, a black Sam Browne shoulder strap and a red shoulder cord.

=== Special Uniforms ===
- Honor Guard: Long-sleeved dress uniform, plus dark blue jacket with tan epaulettes, black Sam Browne shoulder strap, red shoulder cord, and white gloves.
- Pipes and Drums: Long-sleeved shirt with white ascot, black glengarry, red-and-black tartan kilt, horsehair sporran, red-and-black hose, black shoes, and white spats.
- Special Response Team & Tactical Marine Unit: Drab green military-style blouse, cargo pants, and utility vest, and desert combat boots. Green helmet worn by SRT, baseball cap or boonie hat by TMU.
- Aircraft: Drab green flight suit with desert combat boots.
- Aircraft (Alternate): OCP-pattern military blouse and cargo pants, green utility vest (Tactical Flight Officers only), and desert combat boots.
- Bicycle Patrol: Black and white high-performance shirt with "State Trooper" printed on the back in black lettering. Worn with black bicycle shorts, athletic shoes, and a black and white bicycle helmet.

Troopers working in environments which might dirty the uniform (such as performing commercial vehicle inspections) or which require constant movement or exertion may wear an altered version of the patrol uniform. This variant replaces the slacks with tan cargo pants and features a baseball cap in lieu of the cowboy hat.

=== Previous Uniforms ===
Early uniforms included a blue-grey blouse and brown pants, typically worn with black motorcycle boots. These uniforms also featured a bow tie and Sam Browne shoulder straps. Troopers of this era wore peaked caps and diamond-shaped badges, with a single patch worn on the left shoulder; until the current uniform was instituted, the patch was circular. This uniform style was used until early 1959, when the current uniform was adopted. Until about 1972, the uniform continued to feature a shoulder strap, only one shoulder patch, and a black necktie, which was worn at all times; in addition, the cowboy hat featured a much smaller brim than those currently worn, so that it somewhat resembled a bowler with a creased crown.

It was not until the mid-2000s that a standardized patch design was used for all members of the patrol. Prior to this change (which is today being slowly integrated into other Texas DPS divisions), differently colored patches identified whether a trooper worked in the highway patrol, driver's license, or license and weight (commercial vehicle) units. Red patches indicated highway patrol, blue indicated driver's license, and grey indicated license and weight. Troopers assigned to the state Capitol had their own unique blue patch depicting the capitol building in yellow.

== Rank structure ==
Rank	Insignia
DPS Director (Colonel)	
Deputy Director (Lieutenant Colonel)	
Chief	
Assistant Chief	
Major	
Captain	
Lieutenant	
Sergeant	
Corporal	
Trooper	No Insignia
Probationary Trooper	No Insignia

== Vehicles ==
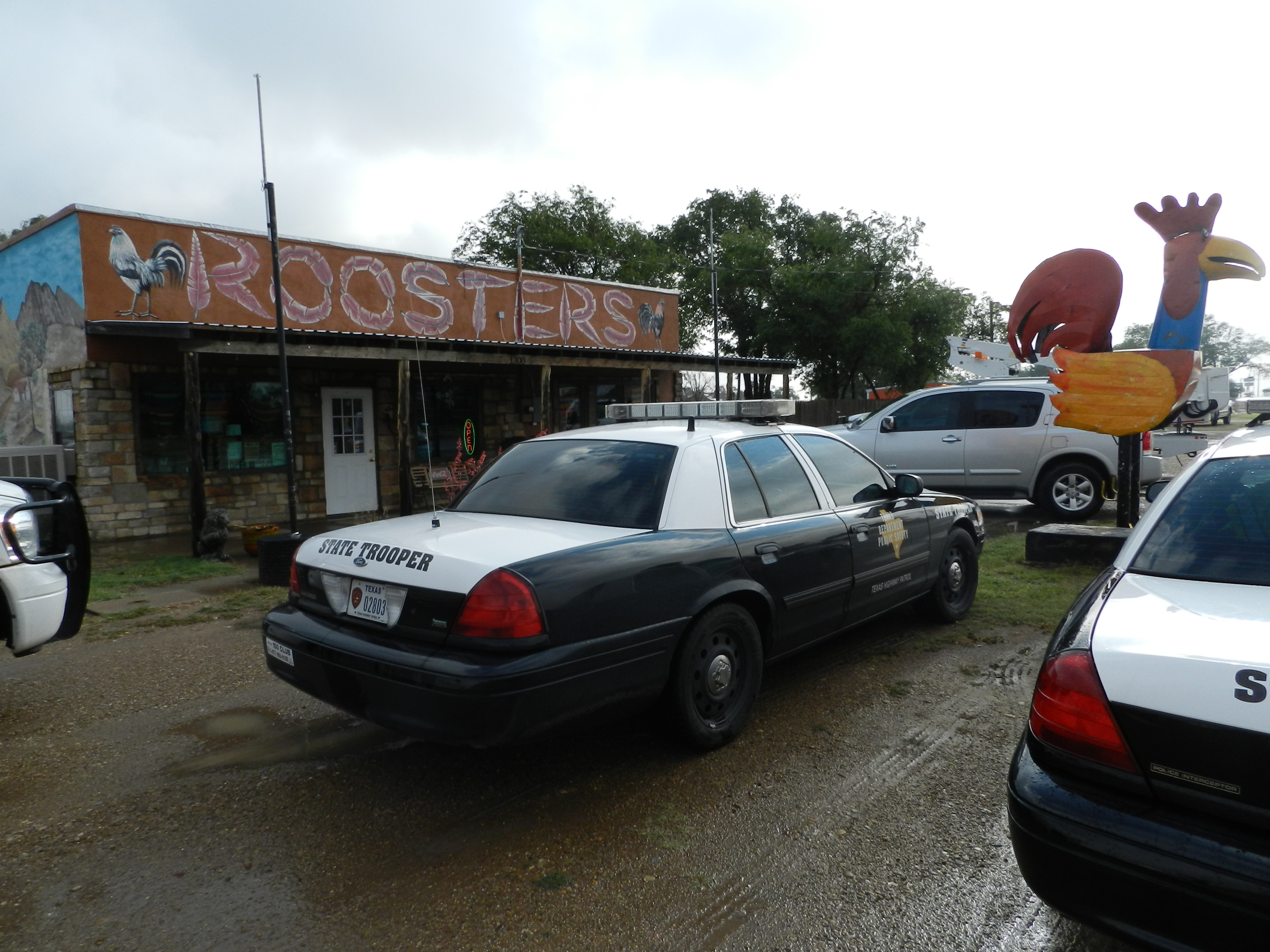
Texas Highway Patrol Ford Crown Victoria in Vega

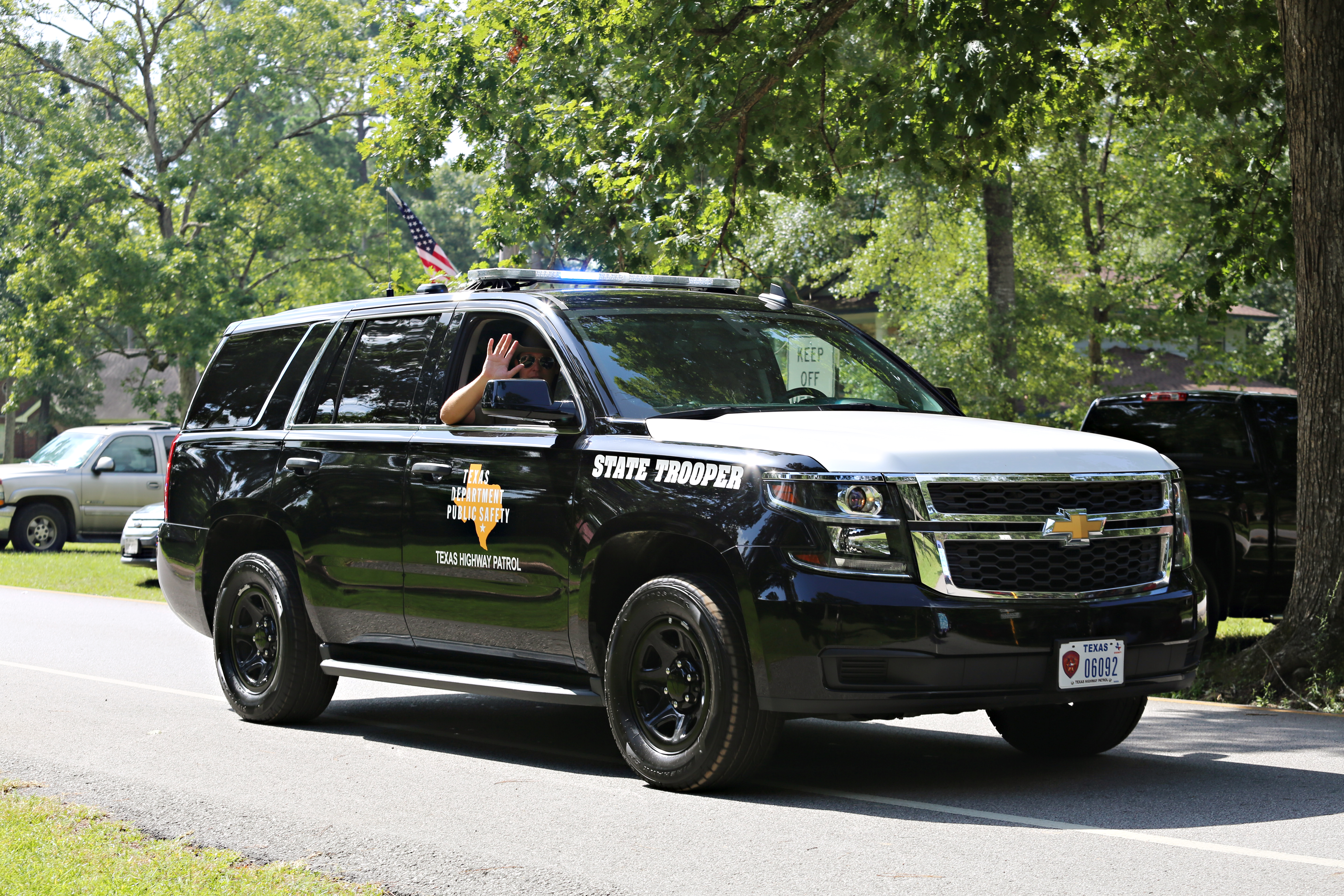
Texas Highway Patrol Chevrolet Tahoe in Roman Forest

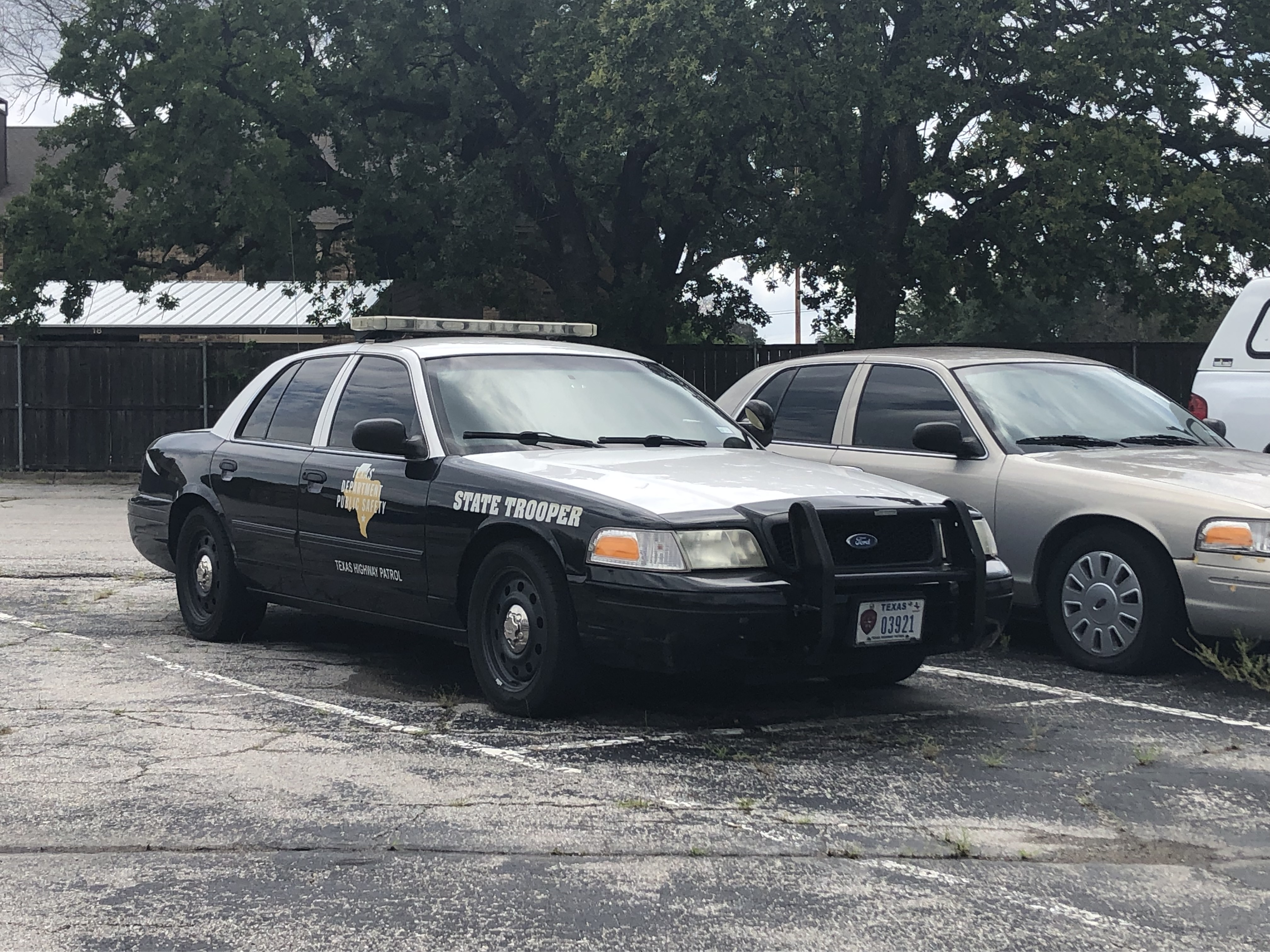
Texas Highway Patrol Ford Crown Victoria at the DPS district office in Hurst

The Texas Highway Patrol uses a variety of vehicles for patrol and specialized services. Early patrol units were motorcycles, but these were phased out in the 1950s. Since then, four-wheeled vehicles have been used for all patrol purposes; one trooper is assigned to each unit.

Current patrol vehicles are painted black with a white hood. Traditionally, the roof pillars, roof and trunk were white, but this practice was stopped with newer vehicles. "Texas Department Public Safety" is printed on the front door over a brown silhouette of the state of Texas. Underneath, "Texas Highway Patrol" is written in white; "State Trooper" is written on the front quarter panel and on the trunk.

The Texas Highway Patrol also utilizes helicopters, armored personnel carriers, and marine craft for specialized functions, such as search and rescue, reconnaissance/intelligence, and border patrol. The Tactical Marine Division is the newest addition to the Highway Patrol, with the acquisition of six patrol vessels intended to police the Rio Grande and international lakes between the U.S. and Mexico. Several more boats are on order.

In 2012, the Texas DPS decided to begin replacing its aging fleet of Ford Crown Victorias with Dodge Chargers. A small number of Ford's Explorer-based Police Interceptor Utility vehicles were purchased for use mainly in the Texas Panhandle. As of 2019, the Highway Patrol fleet consists primarily of Chevrolet Tahoes and Ford Police Interceptor Utilities. Several Dodge Chargers and a few Ford Crown Victorias are still in use, though these units are being gradually retired.

Patrol Vehicles

- Ford Crown Victoria Police Interceptor
- Dodge Charger
- Chevrolet Tahoe
- Ford Police Interceptor Utility
- Dodge Durango

Motorcycles

- BMW R1200RT-P (Austin only)

Helicopters

- 14 Eurocopter AS350 (3 Hoist Equipped)
- 1 Eurocopter EC-145 (Hoist Equipped)

Fixed-Wing Aircraft

- 2 Cessna 208 Caravan
- 4 Cessna 206
- 2 Pilatus PC-12
- 1 King Air 350

Marine Craft

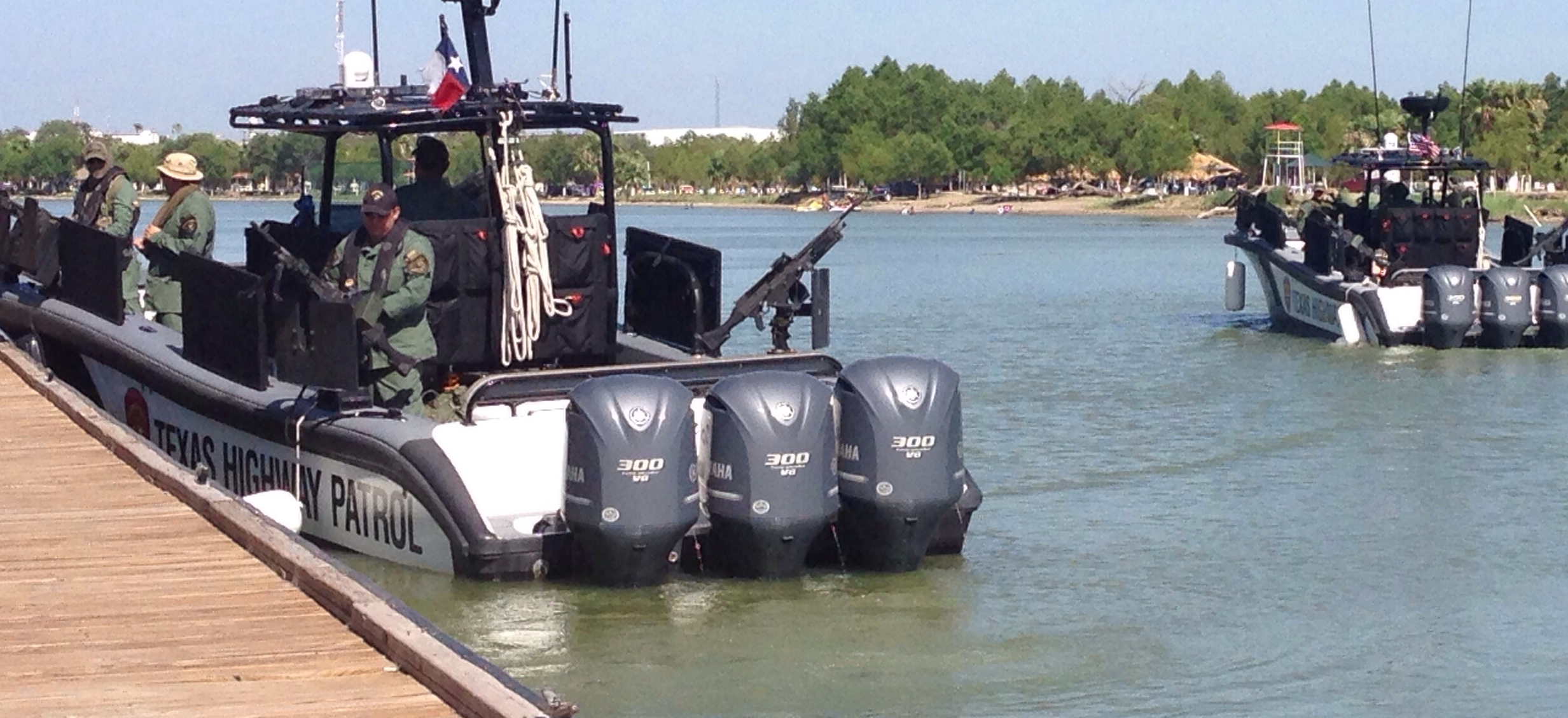
Texas Highway Patrol gunboats in the Rio Grande

- Yellowfin Shallow Water Interceptor

S.R.T.

- LENCO BearCat
- Humvee

Recruiting

- Hummer
- Dodge Challenger

Other Transportation

- Bicycles (Austin only)
- Horses (Austin only)

== Equipment ==
Prior to the SIG Sauer P226 chambered in .357 sig troopers carried the SIG Sauer P220 chambered in .45 auto or in 9mm.

In 2013, Texas DPS officials announced that they would be switching to the Smith & Wesson M&P, 9-millimeter handgun as the standard-issue sidearm for troopers, due to higher round capacity over the SIG Sauer. Troopers already issued .357 sidearms would be allowed to continue using them. However, the transition was suspended after recruits at the A-2014 class, the first to train with the new weapons, reported functional concerns about the guns after repeated firing.

In early 2015, the Texas Department of Public Safety completed the process of selecting a replacement for the SIG Sauer P226, selecting the SIG Sauer P320, a polymer-framed, striker-fired pistol chambered in 9-millimeter. The C-2015 recruit class was the first Texas DPS class to be issued and trained on the SIG Sauer P320 and, upon graduation in December 2015, became the first Troopers to carry this pistol in the field as a duty weapon. The 9-millimeter ammunition selected for the SIG Sauer P320 was the Hornady 135 grain + P FlexLock Critical Duty. Other Texas DPS divisions, such as Aircraft and Criminal Investigations, will transition to the P320 over time.

Additional weaponry includes the Daniel Defense M4V7 rifle and the Remington 870 12-gauge shotgun, which is currently being phased out for the Mossberg 590. All firearms are state property and may not be modified by the troopers to whom they are issued. Less-lethal weapons issued to troopers includes expandable straight batons, oleoresin capsicum spray, and Tasers.

Patrol cars are equipped with ruggedized Dell Latitude computer terminals and digital citation printers. Mounted lights are either the Whelen Freedom lightbar, in older units, or the Whelen Liberty lightbar, in newer units; the patrol's newest Chevrolet Tahoe patrol vehicles are equipped with Whelen Legacy lightbars. Four of the bar's eight forward-facing light modules are white "takedown" lights, used for enhanced visibility in low-light operations. Warning lights are also mounted on the rear deck. Primary light colors for all vehicles are red and blue.

== Salary and Promotions ==
As of fiscal year 2010, troopers were being paid almost 20% less than officers in many municipal police departments, according to a state-conducted audit. Consequently, increased salaries for troopers were approved for 2014 by the 2013 Texas legislative session.

Troopers are automatically upgraded to different trooper classes in four-year increments. Salary increases with each class, up to Trooper VI, at which point pay becomes and remains steady (barring promotion). Troopers are eligible for promotion to sergeant after four years of service. Promotion is based on availability and completion of a civil service exam, as well as experience and disciplinary history. After two years as a sergeant, troopers are eligible for promotion to lieutenant.

In September 2015, troopers received yet another sizable raise - an academy trainee makes more now than a 3-year trooper did a year prior.

In 2025, the Texas Legislature authorized an expanded enforcement program that includes a 50 hour work week. From October 1, 2025 to September 31, 2027, troopers who have 12 months of probation period will have a yearly salary of $65,851.00. Troopers with 4 years of service will have a yearly salary of $80,274.00, 8 years of service will have $85,989.00, 12 years will have $89,789.00, 16 years will have $93,937.00, and 20 years will have $98,085.00.

=== Response to 2010 Audit ===
Many changes to salaries and promotional requirements were made in response to a 10% drop in the number of troopers between 2004 and 2010, when an audit was conducted. The audit determined that Highway Patrol troopers were being paid far less annually than officers at many metropolitan police departments and sheriff's offices. The problem had been present for many years, but had gone unresolved because the Texas State Legislature sets state employee salary, not individual agencies. Additionally, state agencies had been asked to cut approximately 10% of their budgets between 2010 and 2012, making lawmakers hesitant to approve a larger budget for DPS. However, many legislators also feared that the decrease in size of the DPS, which was predicted to worsen, would result in a gradual lapse in quality of service. As a result, a 20% pay increase in the salary of most Texas DPS officials was approved in 2012. Additional legislative measures are intended to shield DPS from most future budget cuts.

In previous years, troopers who received promotions were typically required to move to fill available posts throughout the state. However, concurrent with the legislative decision to increase trooper pay, an internal decision was made by the Texas DPS to relax this method, allowing troopers to have more say in where they are stationed upon being promoted. The decision was based on a trend of troopers being required to live hours away from their families in order to prevent their spouses from having to leave steady employment.

DPS also made an effort to fill state trooper vacancies. Recruitment efforts were increased across the country, particularly focusing on military members preparing to leave active duty. Recruiters traveled as far as California, North Carolina, and Michigan in search of potential applicants.

== Demographics ==
Texas Highway Patrol Ethnicity Demographics as of 2016
1. White (59.0%)
2. Hispanic (30.0%)
3. Black (9.00%)
4. Asian (2.00%)

Sex Demographics as of 2016:

- Male: 95%
- Female: 5%

== Fallen troopers ==
Since the establishment of the Texas Highway Patrol, 87 troopers and patrolmen have died in the line of duty.

The fallen Troopers are listed below:

Rank	Name	Date of death	Cause of death	Age	Location
Patrolman	Arthur W. Fischer	January 18, 1932	Motorcycle collision with livestock	25	Harris County
Patrolman	Aubrey Lee Moore	April 16, 1932	Motorcycle collision	30	Tarrant County
Patrolman	Edward Bryan Wheeler	April 1, 1934	Shot by outlaws Bonnie and Clyde	26	Near Grapevine
Patrolman	Holloway Daniel Murphy	April 1, 1934	Shot by outlaws Bonnie and Clyde	22	Near Grapevine
Patrolman	Joseph Newton Avary	May 17, 1935	Motorcycle collision		Near Barstow
Patrolman	Guy Albert Freese	July 11, 1935	Motorcycle collision with bus		Tarrant County
Patrolman	Mart Dennis Tarrant	November 4, 1935	Motorcycle collision with drunk driver	38	Waco
Patrolman	David A. McGonagill	September 4, 1940	Struck by lightning		Lubbock County
Patrolman	Roger Q. Harriss	April 5, 1942	Motorcycle collision with truck		Hopkins County
Patrolman	Floyd E. Lawson	April 7, 1948	Vehicle collision with parked car	32	Bee County
Patrolman	Louis W. Dickson	April 17, 1949	Vehicle collision with truck	26	Bell County
Patrolman	Bill J. Mahoney	April 17, 1949	Vehicle collision with truck	24	Bell County
Patrolman	Winfred O. Hanna	January 25, 1954	Shot		Bowie County
Patrolman	Felix A. Murphy	March 4, 1954	Struck by vehicle while directing traffic	23	Lubbock
Patrolman	Robert J. Crosby	November 27, 1954	Shot during traffic stop	26	Houston
Patrolman	Milton Doyell Brooks	January 2, 1955	Vehicle collision while pursuing speeder		Dallas County
Patrolman	Audie Alger Isbell	April 7, 1955	Vehicle collision while pursuing speeder	37	Walker County
Patrolman	Lynn Ray Smith	January 25, 1957	Struck and killed by vehicle		Motley County
Patrolman	Benjamin Kyle Smith	June 23, 1958	Shot while arresting suspect		Montgomery County
Patrolman	Herman Paul Marshall	May 17, 1960	Vehicle collision		Childress County
Patrolman	Richard Dale Berens	March 8, 1963	Vehicle collision while chasing speeder		Aransas County
Patrolman	Kenneth W. Harrison	June 8, 1963	Shot while transporting prisoners	37	Cooke County
Patrolman	Bobby Lee Maynard	November 30, 1964	Vehicle collision		Galveston County
Patrolman	Harry Lee Mills, Jr.	April 3, 1965	Vehicle collision	28	Sinton
Patrolman	Charles Austin Pryor	April 27, 1965	Struck by train		Moore County
Patrolman	Robert Franklin Stinnett	July 2, 1965	Vehicle collision with truck		Wilbarger County
Patrolman	Darvin K. Hogg	April 25, 1966	Shot while arresting murder suspect		Gonzales County
Patrolman	Billy Ray Wynn	December 24, 1967	Vehicle collision with drunk driver		Jasper County
Patrolman	Fred Carlton Burns	January 2, 1968	Vehicle collision with tractor-trailer		Montgomery County
Patrolman	Tom P. Holland	April 23, 1969	Struck by train		Jefferson County
Patrolman	Norman Edward Zator	October 6, 1969	Shot during traffic stop		Near La Marque
Patrolman	Travis Raburn Locker	November 9, 1969	Shot during traffic stop		Near Waxahachie
Patrolman	Douglas Houston Thompson	December 7, 1969	Vehicle collision with hit-and-run driver		Parker County
Sergeant	Gara Oliver Cooper	October 2, 1970	Struck by vehicle while directing traffic		Harrison County
Patrolman	Billy Dan Howry	March 18, 1972	Struck by drunk driver during traffic stop		Williamson County
Patrolman	Gayle Lamar Holmes	May 19, 1972	Shot while arresting suspect	26	King County
Patrolman	Kobler C. Winn, Jr.	December 1, 1973	Vehicle collision		Henderson County
Patrolman	Larry Eugene Hobson	December 1, 1973	Vehicle collision		Henderson County
Patrolman	Ernest Clarence Dobbs	February 15, 1974	Struck by vehicle	32	Leon County
Patrolman	Harold D. Hambrick	July 7, 1974	Heart attack		Callahan County
Patrolman	John David Oldham	July 7, 1974	Struck by vehicle while directing traffic	26	Callahan County
Patrolman	Hollie Lamar Tull	September 14, 1974	Shot while confronting bank robbers	48	Walburg
Trooper	Jimmie Weldon Parks	August 10, 1975	Struck by vehicle during traffic stop		Howard County
Trooper	Mark Alan Frederick	April 4, 1976	Shot during traffic stop		Austin County
Trooper	Tomie Michael Tucker	May 29, 1976	Vehicle collision while pursuing motorcycle		Brazoria County
Trooper	Sammy Charles Long	November 21, 1976	Shot during traffic stop		Near Rankin
Trooper	Jerry Don Davis	October 5, 1980	Shot during traffic stop	25	Slaton
Trooper	Hollis Stephen Lacy	December 26, 1980	Vehicle collision while pursuing suspect		Near Denton
Trooper	Howard Wayne Jordan	June 2, 1981	Struck by vehicle while weighing tractor-trailer		Bowie County
Trooper	David Irvine Rucker	September 29, 1981	Shot during traffic stop	37	Cameron County
Trooper	Ernesto Alanis	February 27, 1983	Struck by drunk driver during traffic stop	26	Hidalgo County
Trooper	Daniel Morrison Higdon, Jr.	March 13, 1983	Crushed between two tractor-trailers during traffic stop		Smith County
Trooper	Milton Curtis Alexander	April 14, 1983	Intentionally struck by vehicle during pursuit	49	Hill County
Captain	Robert Ray Jones	September 16, 1983	Accidentally shot during weapons training	57	Dallas County
Trooper	Russell Lynn Boyd	October 11, 1983	Shot during traffic stop	25	Near Hempstead
Trooper	William Paul Kohlleppel III	April 19, 1985	Struck by tractor-trailer during traffic stop		Austin County
Trooper	Ralph George Zerda	May 21, 1989	Struck by drunk driver	29	Near San Antonio
Sergeant	William John Kuhnle, Jr.	May 21, 1989	Struck by drunk driver	36	Near San Antonio
Corporal	Willie Dale Taylor	May 19, 1990	Struck by tractor-trailer during traffic stop	50	Crockett County
Trooper	Mark Jeffrey Phebus	September 17, 1990	Shot while investigating domestic dispute	23	Harris County
Trooper	Carlos Ray Warren	March 5, 1991	Shot upon encountering a kidnapping in progress	30	Near Del Valle
Trooper	Bill Davidson	April 12, 1992	Shot while stopping stolen vehicle	43	Edna
Trooper II	Bobby Steve Booth	June 16, 1993	Shot during struggle with suspect	27	Near Stratford
Trooper	Troy Merle Hogue	December 30, 1994	Shot during accident investigation	39	Howard County
Trooper	Timothy Wade McDermott	May 14, 1995	Vehicle collision	42	En route to Austin from Marshall
Corporal	Roel Garcia	March 26, 1997	Vehicle collision with truck	37	Brooks County
Trooper	Terry Wayne Miller	October 12, 1999	Shot from ambush	37	Atascosa County
Trooper	Randall Wade Vetter	August 7, 2000	Shot during traffic stop	28	Hays County
Senior Trooper	Richard Dale Cottle	May 9, 2001	Vehicle collision with tractor-trailer	51	Near Waco
Trooper	Kurt David Knapp	May 8, 2004	Vehicle collision	28	Near Comfort
Trooper	Jimmy Ray Carty, Jr.	May 26, 2005	Head injuries sustained during recruit training	30	Austin
Trooper	Billy Jack Zachary	January 1, 2006	Struck by vehicle during traffic stop	32	Near Monahans
Trooper	Matthew DeWayne Myrick	January 20, 2006	Vehicle collision	36	Hereford
Trooper	Eduardo Chavez	May 2, 2006	Vehicle collision	30	Near Hidalgo-Starr County line
Trooper	Todd Holmes	March 14, 2007	Vehicle collision with tractor-trailer	29	Harrison County
Trooper	James Scott Burns	April 29, 2008	Shot following vehicle pursuit	39	Marion County
Corporal	David Ralph Slaton	September 20, 2010	Vehicle collision with tractor-trailer	56	Montague County
Trooper	Jonathan Thomas McDonald	November 15, 2010	Vehicle collision	28	Near Post
Trooper	Javier Arana, Jr.	March 24, 2012	Vehicle collision with truck	32	El Paso
Sergeant	Paul Hernandez	October 4, 2012	Heart attack during physical readiness training	67	San Antonio
Sergeant	William Karl Keesee	October 29, 2015	Vehicle collision	49	Near Goldthwaite
Trooper	Jeffrey Don Nichols	March 26, 2016	Vehicle collision	27	Tigertown
Senior Trooper	Thomas Patrick Nipper	November 4, 2017	Struck by vehicle during traffic stop	63	Temple
Trooper	Damon Charles Allen	November 23, 2017	Shot during traffic stop	41	Near Fairfield
Trooper	Moises Sanchez	August 24, 2019	Shot during accident investigation	49	McAllen
Trooper	Chad Walker	March 28, 2021	Shot from ambush	38	Mexia
Sergeant	Paul Mooney	June 14, 2021	Complications from COVID-19	52	El Paso
Trooper	Kevin Alexis Ramirez-Vasquez	September 24, 2024	Struck by a vehicle during accident investigation	25	Odessa
Trooper	Jerry Wayne Adamick, Jr.	September 15, 2025	Vehicle collision with tree	44	San Jacinto County
Trooper	Sergio Romero	June 17, 2026	Vehicle collision	27	Childress

All fallen Highway Patrol troopers are publicly honored at the Texas Peace Officers' Memorial in Austin, a memorial at the Texas Department of Public Safety headquarters, and by various memorial markers throughout the state.

== Grapevine Slayings ==
The Grapevine Slayings were the murders of two Texas Highway Patrolmen on April 1, 1934 by members of the Barrow Gang, popularly known as Bonnie and Clyde.

Patrolmen Holloway Daniel "H.D." Murphy and Edward Bryan Wheeler, both stationed in Fort Worth, were on routine patrol on State Highway 114 in Grapevine when they noticed a car parked on intersecting Dove Road. Believing the vehicle's occupants were in need of assistance, the troopers approached the car. They were unaware that the car's occupants were Bonnie Parker, Clyde Barrow, and Henry Methvin, outlaws wanted in several states for a string of robberies, kidnappings, and murders - including those of multiple police officers - that began in 1932 and had brought the gang nationwide attention.

As the patrolmen approached the car, they were unexpectedly met with gunfire. Trooper Wheeler was struck first and was killed instantly, his service weapon still holstered. Upon witnessing the death of his colleague, Trooper Murphy, a recent academy graduate on one of his first patrols, attempted to retrieve a shotgun from his motorcycle. However, he was shot before he could load the weapon. A passing motorist witnessed the shooting and flagged down another trooper, who arrived to find Wheeler dead and Murphy in critical condition. Trooper Murphy died on his way to a hospital in Grapevine.

=== Aftermath ===
Although the Barrow Gang had enjoyed a romantic image among many Americans before the Grapevine shootings, their popularity waned rapidly in the wake of the killings. Much of the public outcry was fueled by exaggerated media coverage of the incident, featuring erroneous claims by purported witnesses, but the shooting is nonetheless often considered the incident which turned opinions predominantly against the Barrow Gang. Although Parker was said to have fired several shots at the troopers, including the fatal shot to Murphy, this report was later discredited. Henry Methvin, a recent prison escapee, ultimately admitted to firing the first shots, mistakenly believing Barrow wanted the troopers killed; it is believed Barrow's actual intention was to kidnap the troopers. Nevertheless, Parker's name was later included on an arrest warrant for murder, along with Barrow and Methvin, the latter listed as "John Doe".

Shortly after the Grapevine Slayings, a posse of Texas Rangers, Dallas County sheriff's deputies, and Bienville Parish, Louisiana sheriff's deputies ambushed and killed Parker and Barrow in Bienville Parish, near Shreveport. The posse's leader, Frank Hamer, was a retired Texas Ranger who had been hired by the Texas Department of Corrections to track down Bonnie and Clyde. In a deal with the officers, Henry Methvin and his family had agreed to betray Parker and Barrow and arrange an ambush.

Today, a monument stone marks the location where Troopers Murphy and Wheeler were killed on Dove Road in present-day Southlake.

== Atascosa County Ambush ==
The Atascosa County Ambush was a surprise attack outside of Pleasanton, Texas on the evening of October 12, 1999 which resulted in the deaths of Trooper Terry Wayne Miller and deputies Mark Stephenson and Thomas Monse, Jr. of the Atascosa County Sheriff's Department. An additional two officers who subsequently arrived on scene were met with a hail of gunfire and received non-life-threatening gunshot wounds.

The perpetrator, Jeremiah Justin Engleton, placed a phony 9-1-1 call on the night of October 12, 1999 from his residence, prompting Deputy Stephenson and Deputy Monse to respond. Upon their arrival, the two deputies were met with gunfire from a high-powered rifle fired by Engleton, who was hiding in a ditch across the street from his mobile home. Both deputies died on scene while radioing for assistance as they sat in their police cruiser. Engleton then retrieved a Glock .40-caliber semiautomatic service pistol from one of the slain deputies before returning to the ditch.

Trooper Terry Wayne Miller arrived on scene, discovered the two bodies of the deputies, radioed for assistance, and was shot and killed before he was able to remove his seatbelt. Moments later, two additional officers, Pleasanton Police Department Officer Louis Tudyk and retired U.S. Immigration and Naturalization Service agent Carl Fisher, arrived on scene and were met with a barrage of gunfire which resulted in both officers being struck in the arm. The two injured officers were saved by 56-year-old cattle rancher Wendell Munson who dodged bullets to assist them into his pickup truck before speeding off. As more law enforcement officers converged on the scene of the crime, Jeremiah Engleton turned the stolen police handgun on himself and committed suicide.

Several firearms were found on Jeremiah Engleton's body, including a Norinco SKS 7.62 x 39mm semiautomatic rifle, a Mossberg 12-gauge pump-action shotgun, a Ruger 9mm semiautomatic handgun, a Glock .40-caliber semiautomatic handgun, and a Lorcin .380-caliber semiautomatic handgun. Investigators also discovered a suicide note hidden in Engleton's right shoe. In the end, over 100 expended rifle and shotgun casings littered the ground around the bodies of three law enforcement officers and the gunman.

=== Aftermath ===
Shortly after the incident, it was discovered that Engleton's then-roommate, Kenneth Vodochodsky, was an accomplice in the purchasing of ammunition to carry out the ambush. Vodochodsky had posted Englton's bail the previous day for an arrest on an unrelated incident; the arresting officer was Thomas Monse, one of the first deputies slain in the ambush. The pair were seen making purchases at a gun shop just hours after Englton had been released from jail. Kenneth Vodochodsky was subsequently arrested on October 15, 1999 and pleaded guilty to two counts of murder. He was initially sentenced to death on March 2, 2001 for his role in the triple murder. The conviction was later appealed and he was sentenced to 30 years in prison under a plea agreement. Kenneth Vodochodsky was denied parole in 2015 and again in 2020.

== In popular culture ==
The department was frequently showcased on the CBS crime drama Walker, Texas Ranger.

== See also ==
- Davis class patrol boat
- List of law enforcement agencies in Texas
- State police
- State patrol
- Highway patrol
