= Methodist Dallas Medical Center =

- Methodist Health System
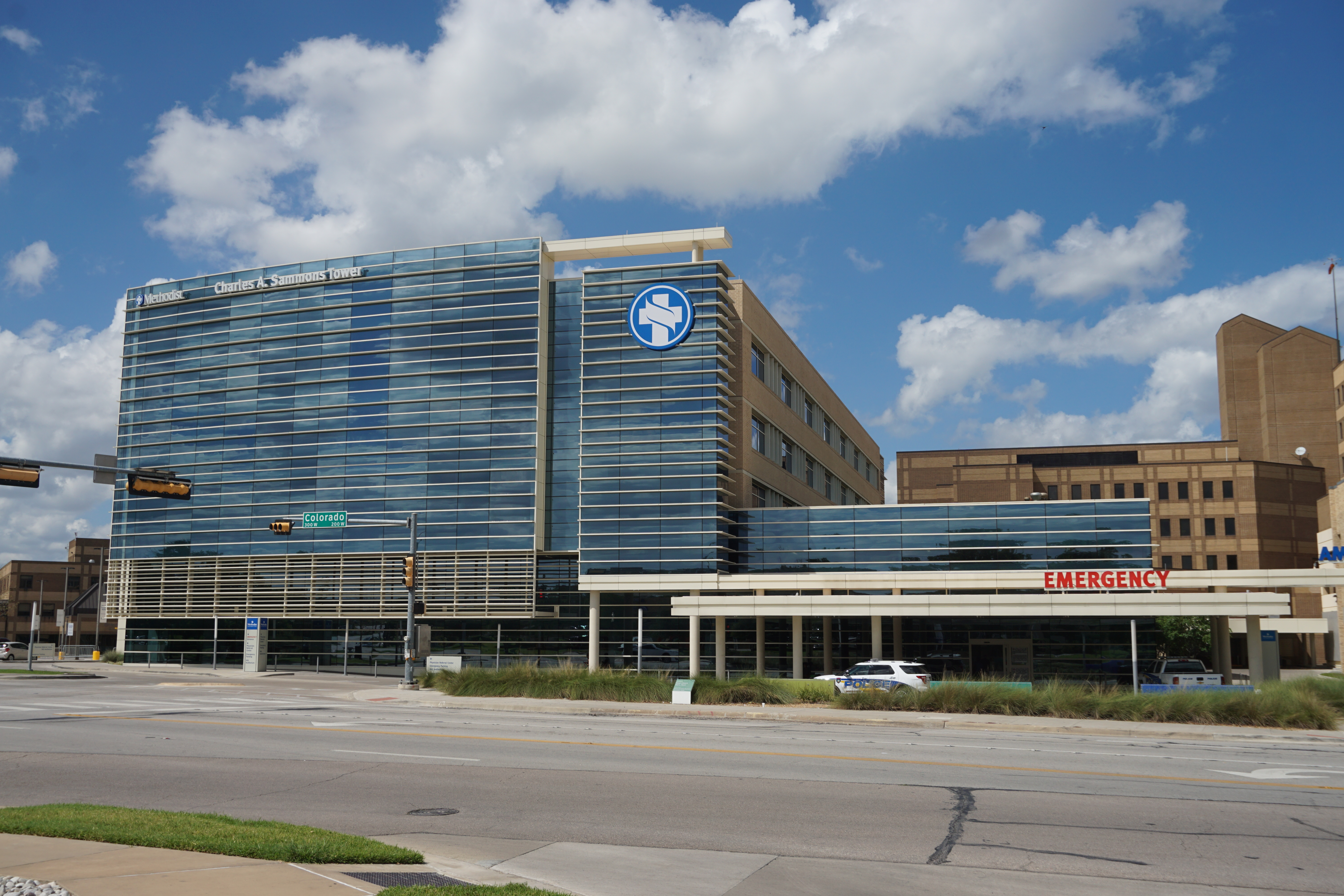

Geography
- Location: Dallas, Texas, United States
- Coordinates: 32°45′40″N 96°49′30″W

Organization
- Funding: Non-profit hospital

Services
- Emergency department: Level I trauma center
- Beds: 592

Helipads
- Helipad: FAA LID: XA62

History
- Opened: 1927

Links
- Website: www.methodisthealthsystem.org/methodist-dallas-medical-center/
- Lists: Hospitals in Texas

Methodist Dallas Medical Center is a non-profit, 592-bed teaching hospital in Dallas, Texas, owned and operated by Methodist Health System.

== History ==
Dallas Methodist Hospital began caring for patients on December 24, 1927, and officially opened as a 100-bed institution on January 27, 1928. A three-story student nurse's residence was built near the hospital in 1951, and the Martin and Charlotte Weiss Educational Building, which provided classroom space for nursing education and a large auditorium for community programming, opened in 1966. Dallas Methodist Hospital had expanded to 420 beds by the 1960s. Methodist began its trauma program in 1979. That same year, Methodist established its first neonatal intensive care unit (NICU). The transplant program at Methodist began in 1980 with the first kidney transplant. In 1986, the hospital performed its first heart transplant, and in 2003, it established a liver transplant program. Methodist Dallas launched the six-story, 248,000-square-foot Charles A. Sammons Trauma and Critical Care Tower in July 2014. The American College of Surgeons classified the hospital as a Level I Trauma Hospital the following year, making it the third Level I Trauma center in Dallas County.

On October 22, 2022, an armed assailant opened fire in the hospital's maternity ward, killing a nurse and a case worker. The suspect arrested, 30-year-old Nestor Hernandez from North Dallas, was on parole for aggravated robbery at the time of the shooting.

== Facilities ==
Methodist Dallas Medical Center is an American College of Surgeons–verified Level I trauma center. The hospital has a transplant institute that performs transplants for several different organs, including kidney, liver, and pancreas. A Level III neonatal intensive care unit (NICU) is also available at the hospital.
