= Davis-class patrol boat =

Class of patrol gunboats

Class overview
- Name: Davis class
- Operators: Texas Highway Patrol
- Built: 2011-2012
- In commission: 2011-2012
- Planned: 6
- Completed: 6
- Active: 6

General characteristics
- Type: Patrol boat
- Length: 34 ft (10 m)
- Draft: 1 ft (0.30 m)
- Propulsion: 3 × outboard motors, 300 hp (220 kW) each
- Armament: 2 × 2, 1 × 1 7.62 mm (0.300 in) M240 medium machine guns

The Davis class patrol boats are a six-boat class of patrol gunboats, operated by the Texas Department of Public Safety Texas Highway Patrol Division for patrolling the Rio Grande. Each boat has an armament of five FN M240 7.62 mm (0.300 in) medium machine guns, and is powered by three 300 hp (220 kW) outboard engines.

Officially classified as "shallow water interceptors" and operated by the Highway Patrol Marine Unit, the boats of the class are named after officers of the Texas Highway Patrol who were killed in the line of duty.

1. J.D. Davis, commissioned 12/8/2011
2. David Rucker, commissioned 3/1/2012
3. Bill Davidson, commissioned 4/11/2012
4. Troy Hogue, commissioned 6/14/2012
5. Russell Boyd, commissioned 8/9/2012
6. Scott Burns, commissioned 11/28/2012
