= Gun violence and gun control in Texas =

Aspect of gun politics in the United States

The State of Texas is considered to have some of the most relaxed gun laws in the United States. Public concerns over gun control in Texas have increased in recent years: as Mexican drug cartels continue to commit violent crimes closer to Texas' stretch of the Mexico–United States border. They have also increased due to the number of incidents, including misuse of firearms stolen from other sources.

The debate over gun control laws generally produces four arguments:

- Those who believe gun control laws effectively reduce gun-related accidents and crime and should be enforced by the government.
- Those who believe gun control laws are ineffective in reducing gun-related accidents and crime and thus support fewer gun control measures.
- Those who believe that the private ownership of guns reduces crime.
- Those who believe the individual right to self-defence is inalienable, and the lawful use of firearms should not be infringed upon before thorough due process, especially in response to, or in the name of preventing, criminal acts of gun violence.

== Federal gun laws ==
The majority of criminal justice activity in the United States takes place at the state and local levels. The U.S. federal government supports these local efforts through national leadership and financial assistance. However, the federal government has used its regulatory authority over interstate affairs to prohibit activities on a nationwide basis that contribute to criminal activity. Title IV (State Firearms Control Assistance) and the 1968 Gun Control Act were two federal reactions to handgun violence. More recently, the Brady Handgun Violence Prevention Act was passed in 1993 and set national minimum requirements for firearms purchases. The main focus of the Brady Act is to prevent felons from obtaining firearms.

== Texas gun control laws ==
According to the Open Society Institute, generally a lobbyist for gun control & an international grantmaking network founded by business magnate George Soros, in March 2000, Texas received a score of negative six (−6) when evaluated on the restrictions imposed by its gun control laws. Each state was scored on 30 criteria, with each criterion assigned a maximum numeric value between 0 and 7. States scoring highest on each criterion are considered to have the toughest gun laws. The only states scoring lower than Texas are Alaska, Louisiana, and Maine.

A factor for Texas' low ranking is its lack of minimum legal age requirements for gun possession.

== Gun ownership ==
During the 2009/2010 fiscal year, the Texas Department of Public Safety issued 123,325 concealed handgun licenses. During that same period, 622 applications were denied, 590 licenses were suspended, and 539 were revoked. Harris County issued the greatest number of licenses in Texas. Over 16%, or 20,564, of all licenses issued within Texas were issued in Harris County.

=== Sales and ammunition ===
In 2009, 11,611 weapons arrests were made in the state of Texas. "Weapons" is defined as the "violation of laws or ordinances prohibiting the manufacture, sale, purchase, transportation, possession, concealment, or use of firearms, cutting instruments, explosives, incendiary devices, or other deadly weapons." This number represents a 3.9% decrease over the weapons arrests made in 2008.

=== Accidents and crime ===
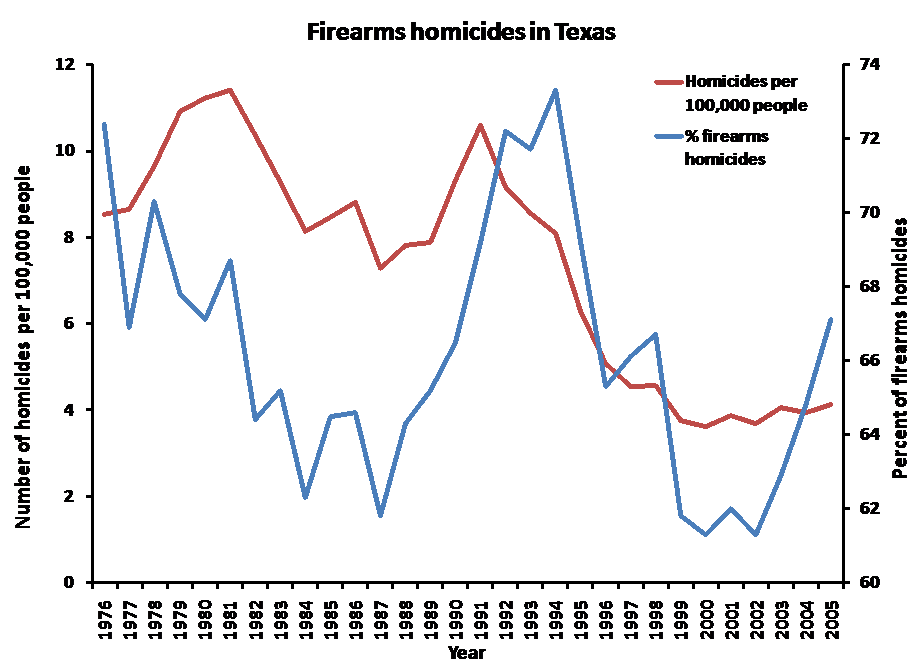
Firearms Homicides in Texas 1976-2005

In 2009, 65,561 total convictions were reported to the Texas State Criminal Repository for various offenses committed by individuals age 21 and over. Of those convicted, 101 individuals held a license to carry a concealed handgun at the time the offense was committed.

==== Homicides ====
For the period 1976–2005, two thirds of total homicides in Texas have been committed with firearms. The year with the most gun homicides was 1991 with 1,835 and has steadily been declining since then and now total firearms homicides account for less than 1,000 per year. The rate of firearms homicides per 100,000 people in Texas had declined to around 4 in the year 2000, but has risen since, to nearly 6 in 2005 (see chart).

According to the Kaiser Family Foundation, in 2014, measuring the number of deaths due to injury by firearms per 100,000 of the population, Texas ranked 30th out of the 50 states and D.C. with 10.7 deaths per 100,000.

== Mexican drug trafficking organizations ==
Most of the firearms violence in Mexico is perpetrated by drug trafficking organizations (DTOs) who are vying for control of drug trafficking routes to the United States and engaging in turf battles for disputed distribution territories. Hundreds of Mexican citizens and law enforcement personnel have become casualties of the firearms-related violence. DTOs operating in Mexico rely on firearms suppliers to enforce and maintain their illicit narcotics operations. Intelligence indicates these criminal organizations have tasked their money-laundering, distribution and transportation infrastructures with reaching into the United States to acquire firearms and ammunition. These Mexican DTO infrastructures have become the leading gun trafficking organizations operating in the United States.

In the past two years, the Bureau of Alcohol, Tobacco, Firearms and Explosives (ATF) has seized thousands of firearms headed to Mexico. ATF has analyzed firearms seizures in Mexico from FY 2005-07 and identified the following weapons most commonly used by drug traffickers:

- 9mm pistols
- .38 Super pistols
- 5.7mm pistols
- .45-caliber pistols
- AR-15-type rifles
- AK-47-type rifles

=== Local and international gun trade ===
==== Guns and drugs trafficking ====
Gun shows are cited as sources for guns used in crime. However, gun shows represent just one of the venues that supply firearms for criminal use. Gun shows are more frequently an intermediate source of crime guns, supplying organized gun trafficking operations. A federal investigation initiated between 1996 and 1998 on illegal gun trafficking found that nearly 26,000 trafficked guns (30% of all guns linked to the investigations) had been sold at gun shows.

As a general rule, one-third of crime guns recovered in most cities are purchased out of state, and another third are purchased in the same state but outside the immediate vicinity. An analysis of data for traced guns recovered in California and Texas from 2003 to 2006 showed that 49.5% were recovered within 25 miles of the initial point of sale. Data from this study also suggested that guns purchased at gun shows travel an even greater distance from the point of sale to the place of use in crime. Studies suggest that gun shows are a more likely choice for criminal gun trafficking operations, which often move guns long distances across state lines or borders with Mexico and Canada.

According to the Stratfor Consultancy headquartered in Texas,

"to understand Mexicoʼs gun problem it is necessary to recognize that the same economic law of supply and demand that fuels drug smuggling into the United States also fuels gun smuggling into Mexico. Black-market guns in Mexico can fetch up to 300 percent of their normal purchase price — a profit margin rivaling the narcotics the cartels sell. Even if it were somehow possible to hermetically seal the U.S.-Mexico border and shut off all the guns coming from the United States, the cartels would still be able to obtain weapons elsewhere — just as narcotics would continue to flow into the United States from other places. The United States does provide cheap and easy access to certain types of weapons and ammunition. Furthermore, as demonstrated by groups such as the Revolutionary Armed Forces of Colombia, weapons can be easily obtained from other sources via the black arms market — albeit at a higher price".

==== Gun violence across the Texas-Mexico border ====
Growing criminal activity in Mexico, particularly in communities across the Southwest border, has raised concerns that the violence might spill over to the United States. Since 2006, United States Department of Justice's annual National Drug Threat Assessment has reported Mexican DTOs and criminal groups are the most influential drug traffickers and the greatest organizational threat to the United States.

Law enforcement reporting indicates Mexican DTOs maintain drug distribution networks or supply drugs to distributors in at least 230 U.S. cities. Mexican DTOs control most of the U.S. drug market and are gaining strength in markets they do not yet control.

=== Homeland security ===
U.S. officials note the violence associated with Mexican DTOs poses a serious challenge for U.S. law enforcement, threatening citizens on both sides of the border. The Government Accountability Office also found that ATF and Department of Homeland Security's (DHS) U.S. Immigration and Customs Enforcement, the primary agencies implementing efforts to address the issue, do not effectively coordinate their efforts, in part because the agencies lack clear roles and responsibilities and have been operating under an outdated interagency agreement. Additionally, agencies generally have not systematically gathered, analyzed, and reported data that could be useful to help plan and assess results of their efforts to address arms trafficking to Mexico.

Before the recently released National Southwest Border Counternarcotics Strategy, the U.S. government lacked a strategy to address arms trafficking to Mexico. Various efforts undertaken by individual U.S. agencies were not part of a comprehensive U.S. government-wide strategy for addressing the problem.

== Gun control ==
=== Prevention and awareness programs ===
In New Mexico, a state suffering from the nation's worst injury mortality rates for many specific causes, a childhood gun safety program was designed and implemented over a four-month period in late 1990. This model has been described as a potential model to be used by other states or communities interested in childhood injury prevention. The components of the program include:

- Increasing gun safety awareness through public service announcements
- Increasing awareness amongst health care professionals and patients on gun safety
- Reaching gun owners to help spread prevention messages
- Monitoring progress and continuing the program.

Physician and health care professionals have played instrumental roles in other types of injury prevention programs (including poison prevention and child motor vehicle restraint awareness). They so are seen as resources to spread messages to parents about firearm safety issues.

=== Political arguments ===
Following the Columbine school shootings on the morning of April 20, 1999, demand for more gun control measures increased from the mainstream media, including calls for restrictions on gun shows, child access prevention laws mandating the locking up of guns, and bans on assault weapons. However, some policy analysts argue that the specific gun control measures proposed in the Columbine aftermath are largely irrelevant.

Others doubt that gun controls possess any preventative efficacy. In response to the Columbine shootings, a columnist of The Denver Post argued that these killers "would have shot their way through a metal-detection device at the schoolhouse door." Conservatives also cite the methods through which the two Columbine shooters obtained their guns as examples of the inefficacy of gun controls. For example, an 18-year-old friend of the killers purchased all of the long guns used during the shootings from three different unlicensed vendors at a gun show in December 1998. Controls over gun shows were seen as irrelevant to preventing the Columbine shootings because the friend who legally purchased the long guns could have also legally purchased the very same guns in a gun store. Some cite a 2003 Centers for Disease Control and Prevention report, which concluded that "there is insufficient evidence to determine the effectiveness of any of the firearms laws or combination of laws reviewed on violent outcomes." Alternatively, a study in The New England Journal of Medicine claims that fewer restrictions on handguns will result in increasing numbers of injuries and deaths.

When faced with public policy propositions for tougher controls over gun show transfers, or even bans on gun shows, some believe that blocking just one channel for guns would not prevent criminals from access. Advocates of gun show restrictions claim that many criminals acquire guns from professional gun traffickers, who acquire their guns from gun shows.

Others have asserted that the Columbine killings could have been prevented or reduced if teachers or guards were armed with guns. While those that oppose will argue that an armed deputy sheriff arrived just five minutes after the Columbine shooting began and was still unable to stop subsequent shootings.

Some gun control advocates assert that youth access to guns is attributable to the failure of gun owners, especially parents, to secure their guns properly. These advocates favor child access prevention (CAP) laws that require owners to keep their guns locked up and/or hold adult gun owners responsible if a youth accesses a poorly secured gun and causes harm with it. Those against gun control argue that these laws ignore two facts:

- Gun owners who store guns loaded and unlocked do so to keep them ready for use in defense against criminals
- Defensive use of guns is both common and effective in preventing injury and property loss.

Gun control advocates also favor CAP laws as a means of preventing gun suicides. Those against argue that gun suicides are commonly committed in the victim's home, where the victim is also the gun owner and therefore has access to the key or combination if the gun is locked. Like suicides, a large share of fatal gun accidents occur in the victim's home, with adults and adolescents accidentally shooting themselves. In 2003, only 51 out of 730 fatal gun accidents in the United States had victims younger than 13. Those against gun control argue that publicity about the dangers of keeping unlocked guns in the home, rather than the existence of laws, may better raise awareness of the risks of storing unlocked guns.

The Coalition to Stop Gun Violence, a gun control advocacy group, favored the banning of all handguns. Other advocacy groups have called for banning small, inexpensive handguns known as "Saturday night special", but those against believe bans on less lethal varieties of guns encourage the substitution of more lethal types of guns. Those against gun control also argue that gun bans would increase injuries and deaths if the gun bans apply to everyone (both criminals and non-criminals), based on the belief that compliance rates to the bans would be lower among criminals than non-criminals, thus implying a larger decrease in gun possession among non-criminals than criminals. Instead, those against stricter gun laws believe gun restrictions should be selectively applied to high-risk subsets of the population, but not to the least lethal subtypes of firearms, as this encourages substitution.

== See also ==
- Gun law in the United States
- Gun laws in the United States (by state)
- Gun politics in Mexico
- Gun politics in the United States
- Gun violence in the United States
- Mexican drug war
- Timeline of the Mexican drug war
