= Texas Department of Public Safety =

Department of the Texas state government

Department of Public Safety of the State of Texas
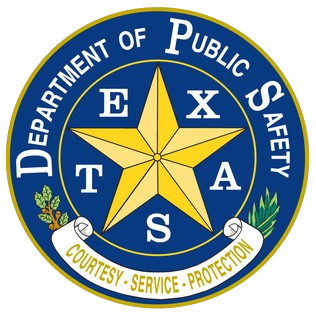
- Common name: Texas Department of Public Safety
- Abbreviation: DPS
- Motto: Courtesy, Service, Protection

Agency overview
- Formed: 1935

Jurisdictional structure
- Operations jurisdiction: Texas, United States
- Area: 261,797 square miles (678,050 km^{2})
- Population: 26,768,000 (2018 est)
- General nature: Civilian police

Operational structure
- Headquarters: 5805 North Lamar Blvd; Austin, Texas
- Agency executives: Freeman F. Martin, Director/Colonel; Jason Taylor/Lt. Colonel, Deputy Director of Law Enforcement Operations; Walt Goodson/Lt. Colonel, Deputy Director of Law Enforcement Services

Website
- www.dps.texas.gov

The Department of Public Safety of the State of Texas, commonly known as the Texas Department of Public Safety (DPS), is a department of the state government of Texas. The DPS is responsible for statewide law enforcement and driver license administration.

The Public Safety Commission oversees the DPS. However, under state law, the Governor of Texas may assume command of the department during a public disaster, riot, insurrection, formation of a dangerous resistance to enforcement of law, or to perform his constitutional duty to enforce law. The commission's five members are appointed by the governor and confirmed by the Texas Senate, to serve without pay for staggered, six-year terms. The commission formulates plans and policies for enforcing criminal, traffic and safety laws, preventing and detecting crime, apprehending law violators, and educating citizens about laws and public safety.

The agency is headquartered at 5805 North Lamar Boulevard in Austin.

== History ==
In March 1927, the "License and Weight Division" was formed to address the escalating problems of increased traffic, and the continual damages caused by large trucks on the narrow state roads. These new inspector positions were staffed by State Police units equipped with motorcycles, and would enforce motor vehicle laws and regulations. Concurrently, the Texas Rangers would continue to conduct the State's law enforcement investigations.

In 1931, during the Great Depression, Texas and other states created a movement that sought to "reform the administrative machinery, and to reduce the high cost of state government." The Texas Legislature enrolled Griffenhagen and Associates, "specialists in public administration and finance who had worked on similar projects throughout the United States and Canada, to make a survey and act as consultants." The firm concluded that Texas' exceptional geographic size caused the Rangers and the License and Weight Division to struggle in providing adequate enforcement across the entire state. The firm also noted the State Highway Patrol's inability to enforce felony charges, which burdened the Rangers with excessive enforcement responsibilities, when they were already overworked. Additionally, the firm negatively reported on the state of Texas utilizing the National Guard for law enforcement along the border. Recommendations were made to accumulate the necessary finances to create a state law enforcement agency. Four bureaus—Administration, State Police, Rangers, and Fire Prevention—were suggested to be created with the implementation of the new force.

The findings of Griffenhagen and Associates were ultimately unpopular across the state, and the Texas Senate created a committee to conduct its own survey of the State's law enforcement. As a result of the committee findings, on January 24, 1935, Senate Bill 146 was introduced. The bill created a "Department of Public Safety" that housed both the Rangers and the State Highway Patrol within one collective organization. The bill received final approval on February 18, 1935, and was sent to the House before finally reaching a joint committee for final revisions. On May 3, 1935, the final bill was voted on and passed, but without two-thirds approval.

On August 10, 1935, the Texas Legislature created the Department of Public Safety, along with 103 other bills. The newly formed department became the new home for the Texas Rangers, The Highway Patrol, and the crime laboratory.

Although Governor James V. Allred created the DPS with the signing of Senate Bill 146, the Legislature was responsible for the selection of three civilians to serve as the "Public Safety Commission". The three selected were: George W. Cottingham, Ernest R. Goens, and Albert Sidney Johnson. Consequently, the trio appointed Captain L.G. Phares as acting director, and Homer Garrison Jr. as assistant director of the new agency. Phares was replaced by Colonel Horace H. Carmichael, who served until his death on September 24, 1938. Homer Garrison Jr. became the third director on September 27, 1938, and continued on as director for nearly 30 years, until his death on May 7, 1968. Garrison made numerous enhancements to the department during his storied career, including improvements to the training curriculum, which was recognized by J. Edgar Hoover, director of the Federal Bureau of Investigation.

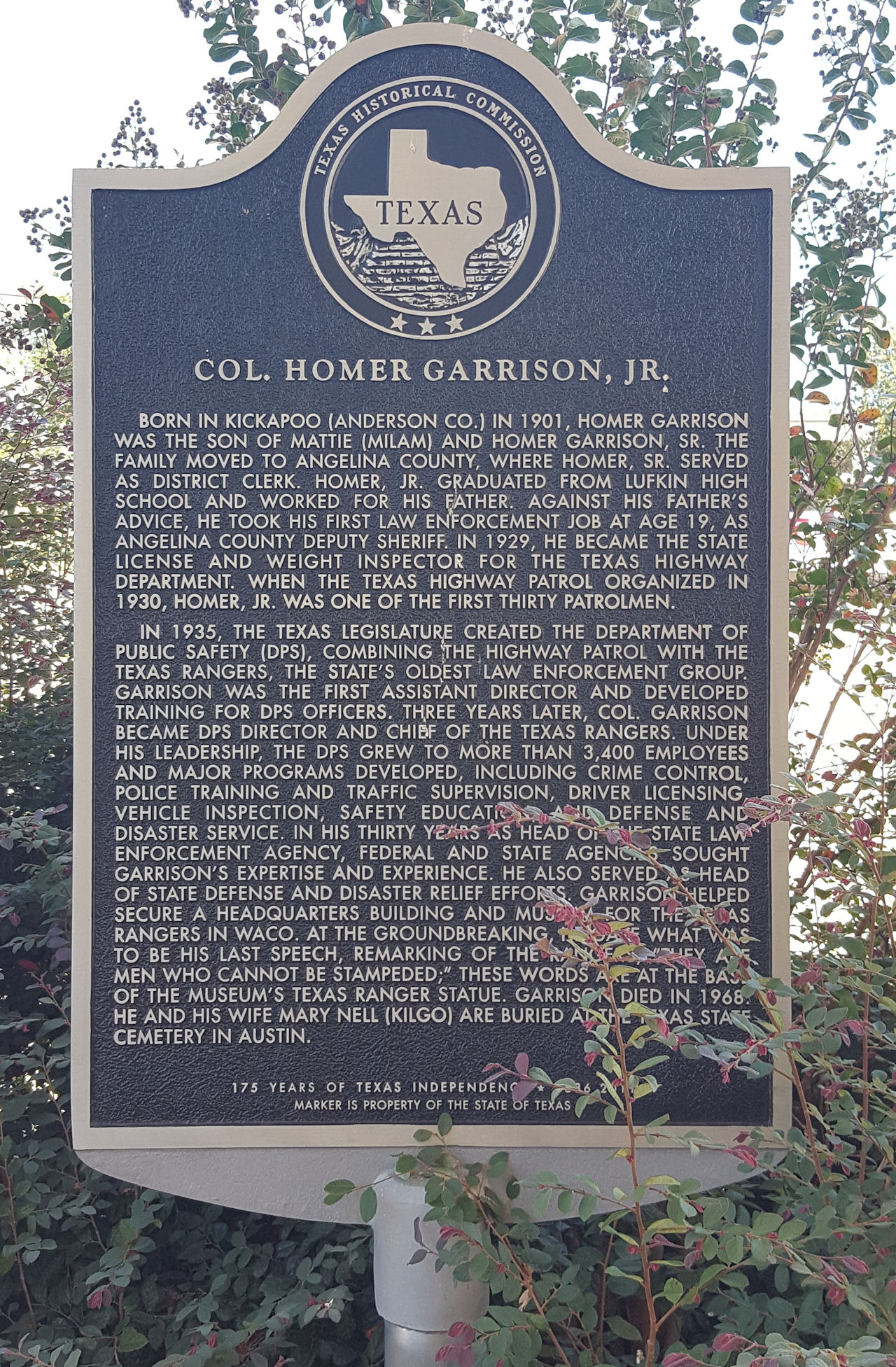

== Divisions ==
DPS is divided into multiple divisions:

- Aircraft Operations
- Chief Auditor's Office
- Crime Laboratory
- Crime Records
- Criminal Investigations
- Cyber Security
- Director's Staff
- Drivers License
- Finance
- Highway Patrol
- Information Technology
- Infrastructure Operations
- Intelligence & Counterterrorism
- Media and Communications Office
- Media and Government Relations
- Office of General Counsel
- Office of Inspector General
- Regulatory Services
- Texas Rangers
- Training Operations

=== Infrastructure Operations Division ===
The Infrastructure Operations Division oversees facility management, fleet operations, communications, strategy implementation, risk management, project management, asset management, mail operations, printing services, warehousing, supply chain distribution, and procurement for the department.

=== Criminal Investigations Division ===
In 2009, the Department of Public Safety created the Criminal Investigations Division (CID) as part of a major restructuring of the department. The CID consists of 700 members, including 573 commissioned officers and 129 civilian support personnel. The CID Assistant Director's Office consists of the assistant director, deputy assistant director, an administrative major, and four civilian support personnel.

The CID is divided into four different sections, which are specialized by function:

- Gang Section
- Drug Section
- Special Investigative Section
- Investigative Support Section

The CID sections work together to prevent, suppress, and solve crime in cooperation with city, county, state, and federal law enforcement agencies. Multi-jurisdictional violations typically investigated by CID include terrorism, gang-related organized crime, illegal drug trafficking, motor vehicle theft, gambling, public corruption, fraud, theft, and counterfeit documents.

=== Driver License Division ===
The Driver License Division is responsible for the issuing and revocation of Texas driver licenses and identification cards.

=== Texas Highway Patrol ===
The Highway Patrol Division is the unit of the department most frequently seen by citizens. Uniformed troopers of the highway patrol are responsible for enforcing traffic and criminal law, usually in unincorporated areas, and serve as the uniformed Texas state police.

Troopers in the Highway Patrol Division also serve a capitol security role, as well as operating the DPS Bike Patrol, Motor Patrol, and Mounted Horse Patrol, all of which serve the Texas Capitol Complex in Austin.

=== Intelligence and Counterterrorism Division ===
The Intelligence and Counterterrorism Division (ICT) plays a leading role in the department's goal of combating terrorism and organized crime.

ICT manages and operates the Texas Fusion Center, formerly called the Texas Joint Crime Information Center (TXJCIC), which serves as the centerpiece in establishing and maintaining a statewide information sharing network. Through the development, acquisition, analysis and dissemination of criminal intelligence information, the Texas Fusion Center supports criminal investigations across the state on a 24/7 basis. Texas Fusion Center personnel include non-commissioned analytical experts and a small number of commissioned officers. Also participating in the Texas Fusion Center are personnel from various other law enforcement and public safety agencies, such as Texas Department of Criminal Justice, Texas Parks & Wildlife Department, Department of Homeland Security, Department of the Treasury, Federal Bureau of Investigation, Drug Enforcement Administration, Immigration and Customs Enforcement, and Air and Army National Guard. ICT analysts also work at other regional fusion and intelligence centers located throughout Texas.

ICT also oversees security at DPS headquarters and the Texas Capitol Complex, a 46 square block area in downtown Austin. The Capitol Complex includes the State Capitol, state office buildings, parking lots and garages, and private office buildings. Security at the Capitol Complex is the responsibility of ICT's Capitol District, which is charged with protecting state property and buildings, and providing a safe environment for state officials, employees, and the general public. The Capitol District provides total police service within the Capitol Complex, including traffic enforcement, parking enforcement, and criminal investigations.

=== Texas Rangers ===
Arguably the most well-known division of the DPS is the Texas Ranger Division, also known as Los Diablos Tejanos (Spanish for 'the Texan Devils'). The Texas Rangers are responsible for state-level criminal investigations, among other duties. The Texas Ranger Division consists of 166 sworn Rangers.

=== Mounted Horse Patrol Unit ===
The unit was established in 2014 to patrol the State Capitol Complex. The MHPU is a component of the THP Division, and functions in coordination with other patrol units within the Capitol Region and other law enforcement agencies. The mission of the MHPU is to enhance community policing efforts, have positive interactions with community members and visitors to the Capitol Complex, suppress civil disturbances, and deter terrorism and criminal activity.

== 2010 corruption investigation ==
- In 2010, Texas Department of Public Safety (DPS) Trooper Mark DeArza, 39, of Houston, and DPS clerk Lidia Gutierrez, 37, of Galena Park, Texas, were convicted of conspiring to sell Texas driver's licenses to unqualified applicants for a fee after pleading guilty to the charge before United States District Judge Gray Miller. According to the FBI public record of the case, the FBI learned through a confidential source of information (CS) that the operator of a Conoco station located on Almeda-Genoa Street in Houston was allegedly selling Texas driver's licenses for a fee. On two separate occasions, first on May 14, 2010, then again on July 26, the CS met with the operator of the gasoline station, and allegedly paid him $3000 for assistance in obtaining a Texas driver's license, and $3500 for assistance with obtaining a commercial driver's license for a friend. In the first instance, the CS was referred to and met with DeArza at the DPS office on May 17, 2010, and with his assistance and that of Gutierrez, obtained a Texas driver's license which he was unauthorized to receive. In the second instance, the CS sought a commercial driver's license for a friend. The CS allegedly paid $3500 for the arrangements to be made with DeArza and Gutierrez to obtain this driver's license as well. On July 26, 2010, at the gasoline station, the CS received a temporary driver's license personally delivered by DeArza. The CS later received both Texas driver's licenses by United States mail. Maen Bittar, 46, of Houston, the operator of a Houston Conoco gas station, pleaded guilty before U.S. District Judge Gray Miller—admitting collecting fees from individuals, such as illegal aliens, in amounts of $3000 or more to arrange with DPS employees Mark DeArza, a DPS Trooper, and Lidia Gutierrez, a DPS clerk, to process applications and receive driver's licenses for these unqualified individuals.
- In 2010, a Texas Department of Public Safety (DPS) trooper was sentenced to four years in prison for depriving multiple motorists of their civil rights, U.S. Attorney José Angel Moreno and Assistant Attorney General for Civil Rights Thomas E. Perez announced. Michael Anthony Higgins (1967–2010), 42, formerly of the Corpus Christi area, was found guilty on January 13, 2010, by a jury's verdict on all four counts of the indictment of willfully stealing money from motorists he stopped on the highway while working as a trooper. In addition to the four-year prison term, U.S. District Judge John D. Rainey ordered Higgins to pay $850 restitution, representing the money he took from the motorists, and will serve a one-year term of supervised release following completion of his prison term. Upon motion of the government, Judge Rainey ordered Higgins, previously released on bond, to be immediately remanded to the custody of the U.S. Marshals Service. Higgins was prosecuted for stopping motorists who appeared to be of Hispanic descent and stealing their money, usually in amounts of several hundred dollars. As a result of the civilian complaints, DPS, in conjunction with the Texas Rangers, initiated an undercover operation to investigate Higgins. An undercover police officer posed as a civilian of Hispanic descent with limited English language ability, and was issued several pre-recorded $100 bills. While being monitored by DPS aerial surveillance, the undercover officer drove past Higgins' duty area in Kleberg County, and was eventually stopped by Higgins. Upon making the traffic stop, Higgins asked the undercover officer for money in his possession, and then took the money behind the passenger side door of his police cruiser. After Higgins returned bills to the officer, the officer realized that some of the money was missing. Texas Rangers and DPS officers confronted Higgins and, upon inspection of the police cruiser, found two of the pre-recorded $100 bills secreted in the passenger side door pocket, which was next to the area where Higgins had gone to count the money. The case was investigated by the FBI, Texas Rangers, and Officers of the Texas DPS. The case was prosecuted by Assistant U.S. Attorney Ruben Perez of the U.S. Attorney Office for the Southern District of Texas, and Trial Attorney Jim Felte from the Civil Rights Division. Not long after being sentenced, Higgins died on April 29, 2010, at the age of 42, while incarcerated in the Coastal Bend Detention Center in Robstown, Texas. Complaining of chest pains the night before, Higgins collapsed, and CPR was performed before he was transported by emergency medical services to Calallen Hospital, where he later died. He was pronounced dead at 7:32 a.m.

== Organization ==
The governing body of the Department of Public Safety is the Public Safety Commission, with all members being appointed by the Governor of Texas. The commission is responsible for appointing the director of the department. The director is assisted in managing the department by three deputy directors and multiple division chiefs. Most divisions report to the director through one of the three deputy directors.

The commission also appoints an inspector general to act as an inspector for the department, and a chief audit executive as part of the internal audit department known as the Chief Auditor's Office, who are both independent of the director. The general counsel acts as the counsel for the commission and the department.

- Public Safety Commission
  - Director
    - Deputy Director – Homeland Security Operations
      - Executive Protection Bureau
      - Government Relations & Media and Communications Division
      - Regional Director, Capitol Region
      - Intelligence and Counterterrorism Division
      - Training Operations Division
    - Deputy Director – Law Enforcement Operations
      - Criminal Investigations Division
      - Texas Highway Patrol Division
      - Texas Rangers Division
      - Aviation Operations Division
    - Deputy Director – Law Enforcement Services
      - Infrastructure Operations Division
      - Driver License Division
      - Finance Division
      - Information Technology Division
      - Law Enforcement Support Division
      - Regulatory Services Division
      - Human Resource Operations Division
      - Cyber Security Division
  - Chief Auditor's Office
  - General Counsel
  - Inspector General

The headquarters of DPS are in Austin. For a period prior to 1989, the headquarters of the Austin Independent School District were adjacent to the DPS headquarters. In 1989, the Texas House of Representatives passed a bill allowing DPS to acquire the former Austin ISD headquarters.

== Gallery ==
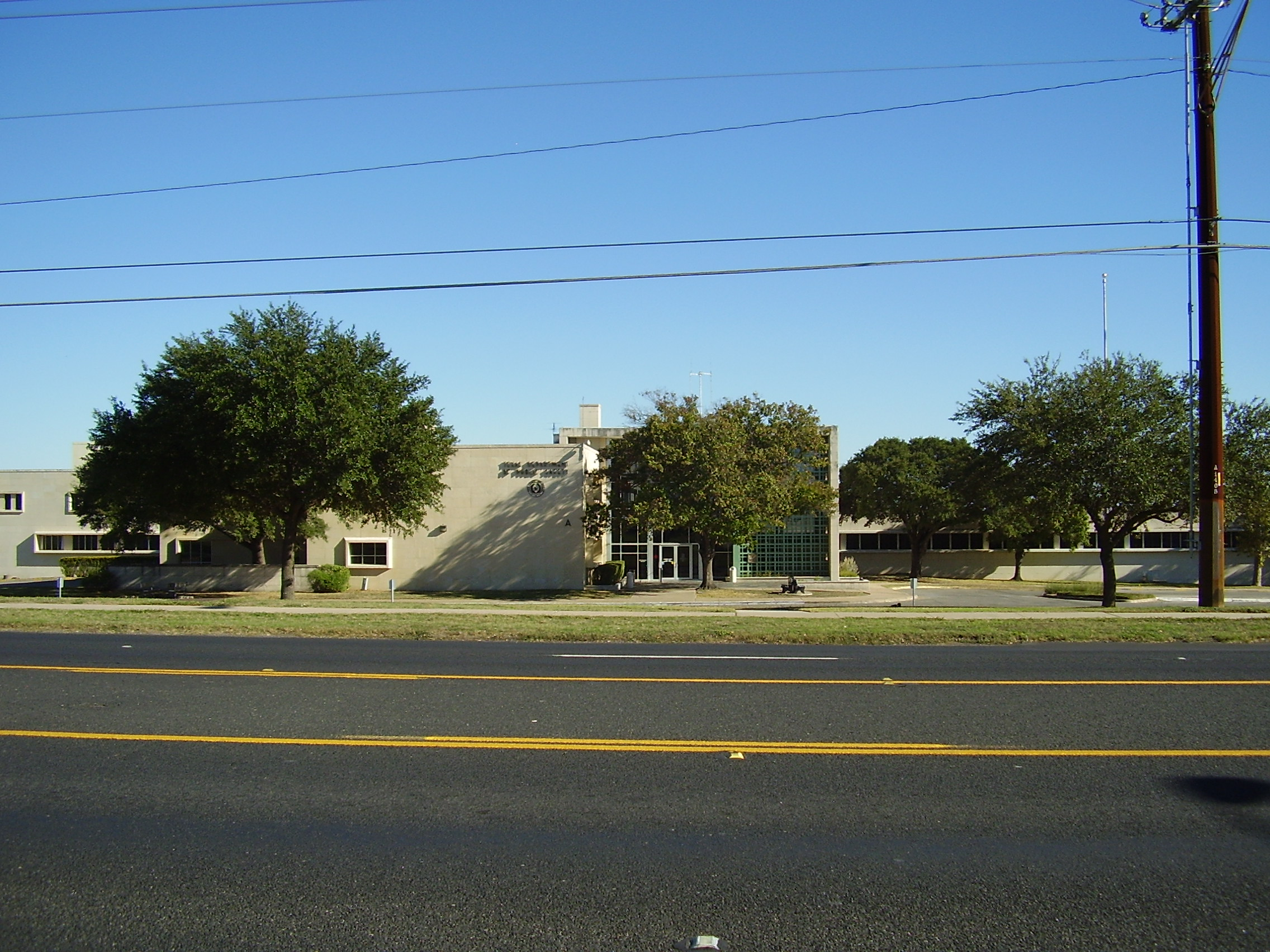
Texas Department of Public Safety headquarters

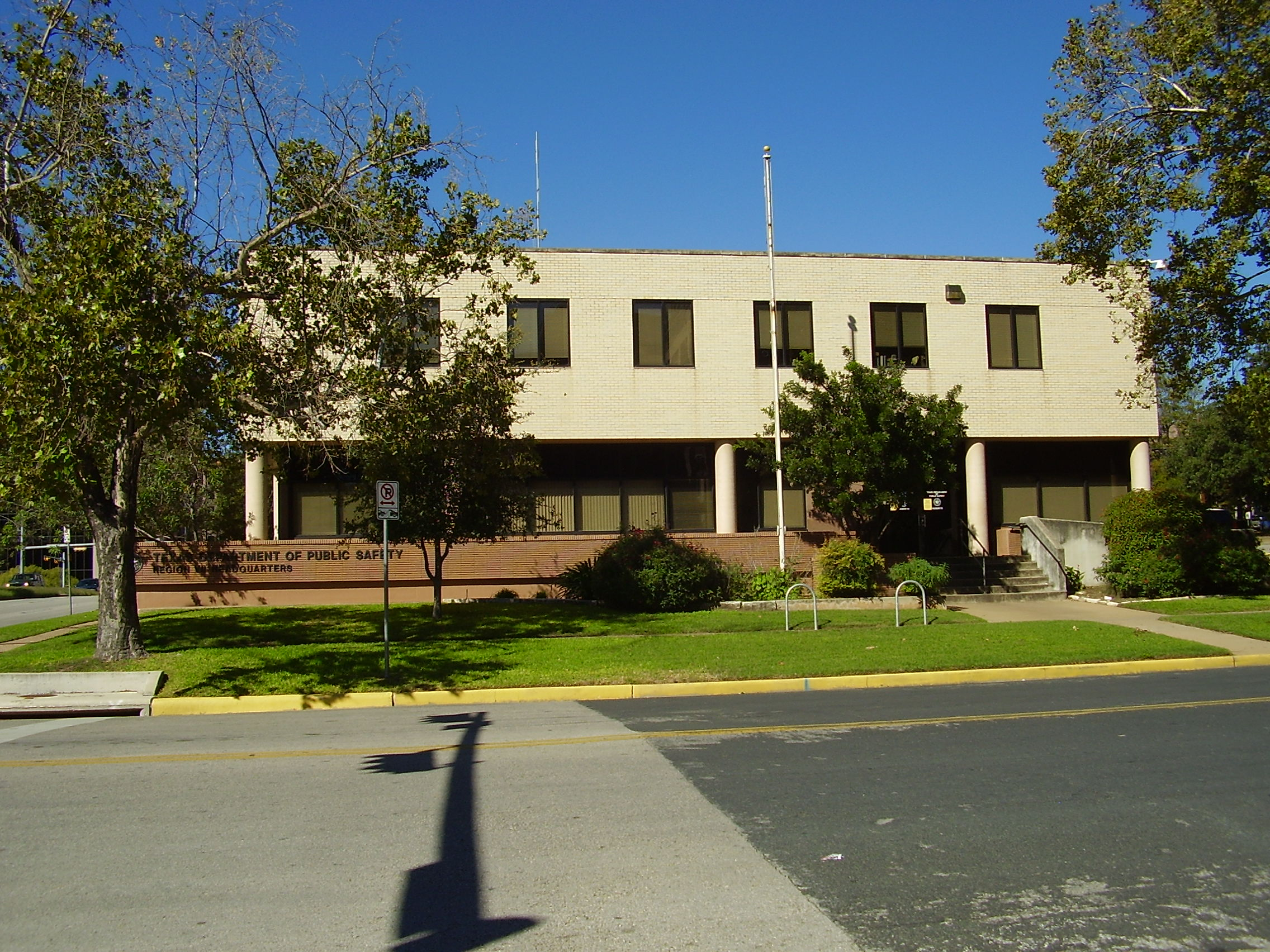
DPS Region VII Headquarters in Downtown Austin

== See also ==
- Davis class patrol boat
- List of law enforcement agencies in Texas
- Department of Public Safety
- Administrative License Revocation
