= Exoskeleton (human) =

Wearable machine meant to enhance a person's strength and mobility

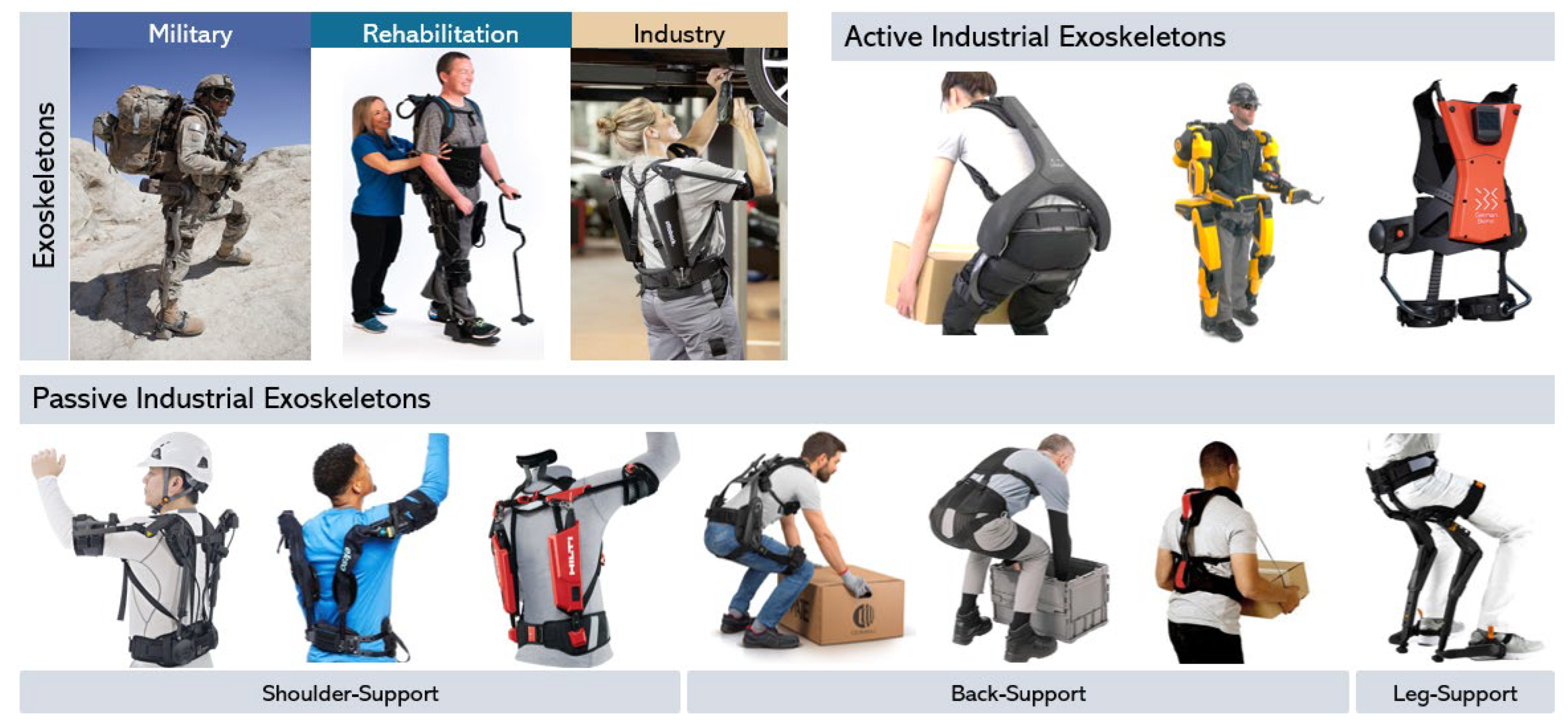
Examples of different types of exoskeletons

An exoskeleton is a wearable device that augments, enables, assists, or enhances motion, posture, or physical activity through mechanical interaction with and force applied to the user's body.

Other common names for a wearable exoskeleton include exo, exo technology, assistive exoskeleton, and human augmentation exoskeleton. The term exosuit is sometimes used, but typically this refers specifically to a subset of exoskeletons composed largely of soft materials. The term wearable robot is also sometimes used to refer to an exoskeleton, and this does encompass a subset of exoskeletons; however, not all exoskeletons are robotic in nature. Similarly, some but not all exoskeletons can be categorized as bionic devices.

Exoskeletons are also related to orthoses (also called orthotics). Orthoses are devices such as braces and splints that provide physical support to an injured body part, such as a hand, arm, leg, or foot. The definition of exoskeleton and definition of orthosis are partially overlapping, but there is no formal consensus and there is a bit of a gray area in terms of classifying different devices. Some orthoses, such as motorized orthoses, are generally considered to also be exoskeletons. However, simple orthoses such as back braces or splints are generally not considered to be exoskeletons. For some orthoses, experts in the field have differing opinions on whether they are exoskeletons or not.

Exoskeletons are related to, but distinct from, prostheses (also called prosthetics). Prostheses are devices that replace missing biological body parts, such as an arm or a leg. In contrast, exoskeletons assist or enhance existing biological body parts.

Wearable devices or apparel that provide small or negligible amounts of force to the user's body are not considered to be exoskeletons. For instance, clothing and compression garments would not qualify as exoskeletons, nor would wristwatches or wearable devices that vibrate. Well-established, pre-existing categories of such as shoes or footwear are generally not considered to be exoskeletons; however, gray areas exist, and new devices may be developed that span multiple categories or are difficult to classify.

== Purposes ==
Exoskeletons can serve various purposes related to medical, occupational, or recreational uses and are frequently categorized by their general field of use.

=== Medical ===
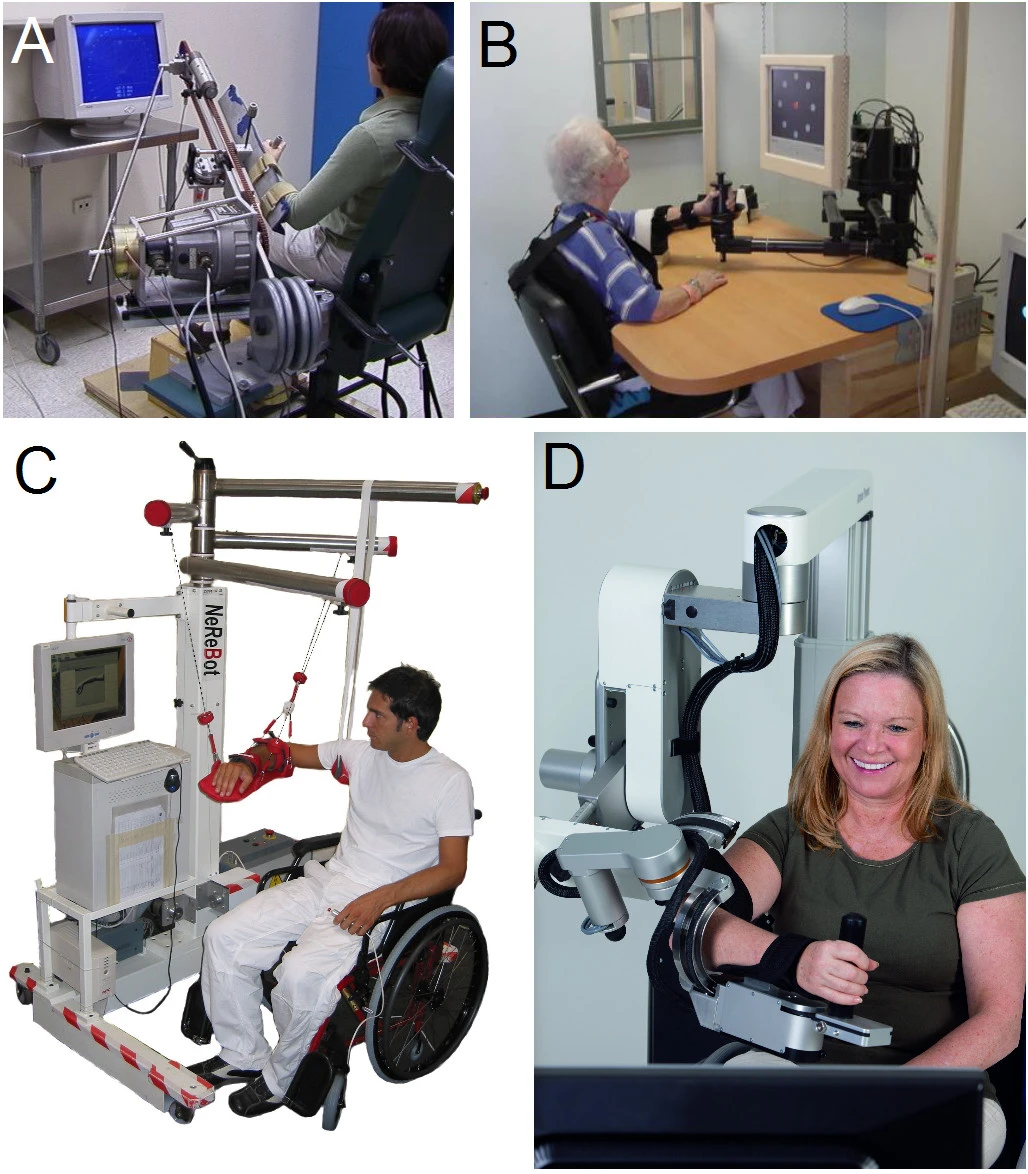
Examples of upper limb medical exoskeletons

Medical exoskeletons typically serve one or more purposes, such as:

- To assist movement or posture for a person with a physical disability or neuromotor impairment
- To rehabilitate a person after an injury or disorder (ExoRehabilitation)

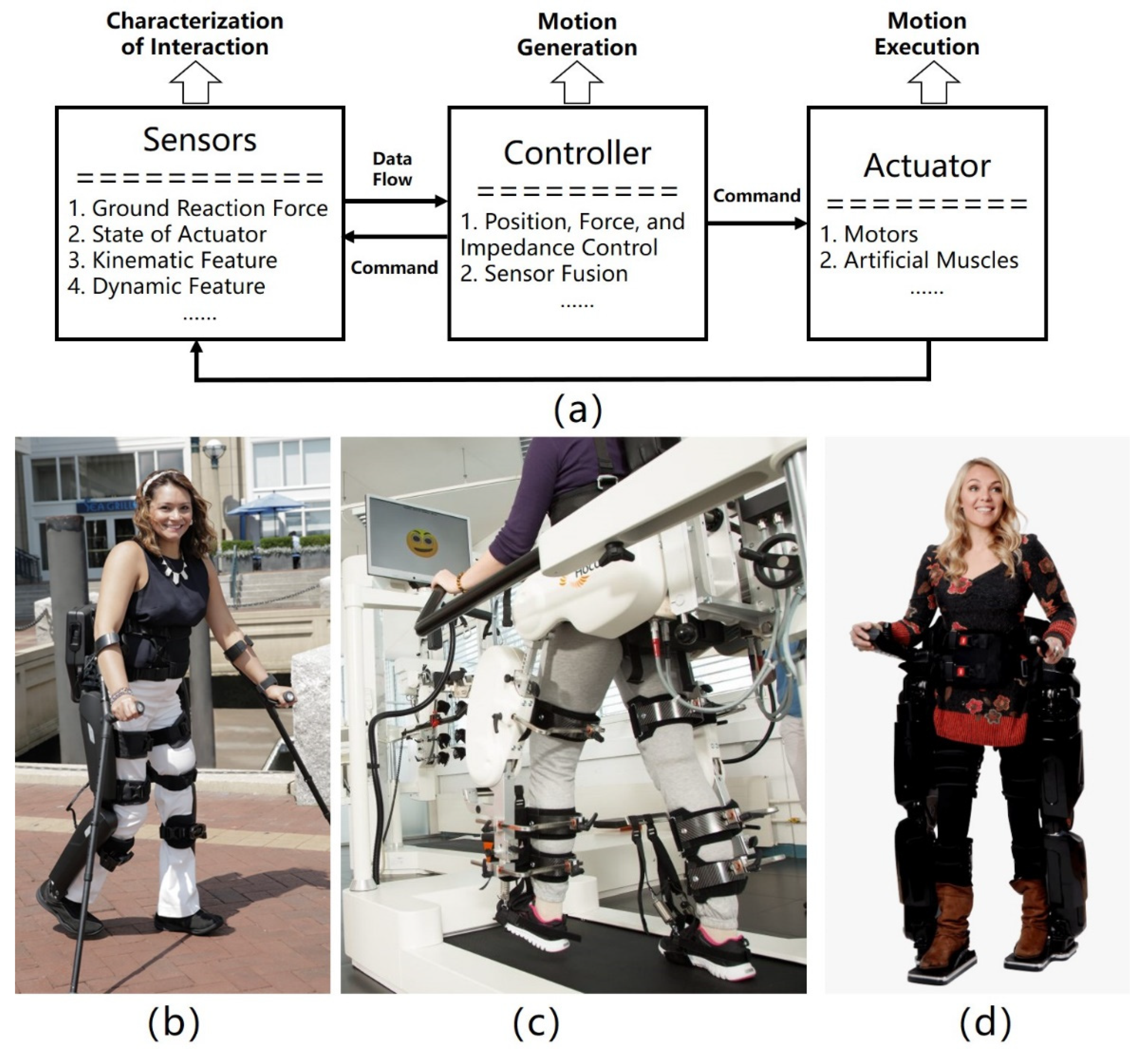
Examples of lower-limb medical exoskeletons, both tethered and untethered devices

Medical exoskeletons have been designed to support people with certain types of physical disabilities or neurological impairments including stroke, spinal cord injury, cerebral palsy, or limb loss. These exoskeletons can target various specific purposes such as to help balance, ambulation, reaching, grasping, coordination, or other functional movements. For rehabilitation, an exoskeleton may only be used temporarily during a limited period of recovery, after which they may no longer require the device. A rehabilitation exoskeleton can be designed to assist a person with movement impairment, for instance, to help stabilize movement or suppress tremors. Alternatively, an exoskeleton can be designed to resist movement to enhance physical training or to help restore strength. In this case, the exoskeleton is resisting the user in the near-term in order to assist them in recovering strength or capabilities in the longer-term. In either case, exoskeletons can be used to enhance the rehabilitation process by increasing the therapeutic dose (e.g., via increased repetitions or difficulty), constraining exercises to specific movements, reducing the required number of clinicians or clinician effort to provide therapy, or providing assessment of performance through on-board sensing. For assistance, an exoskeleton may be used chronically, intermittently, or only temporarily. Exoskeleton assistance can also be paired with other technologies or modalities, such as functional electrical stimulation (FES) or epidural electrical stimulation (EES).

=== Occupational ===
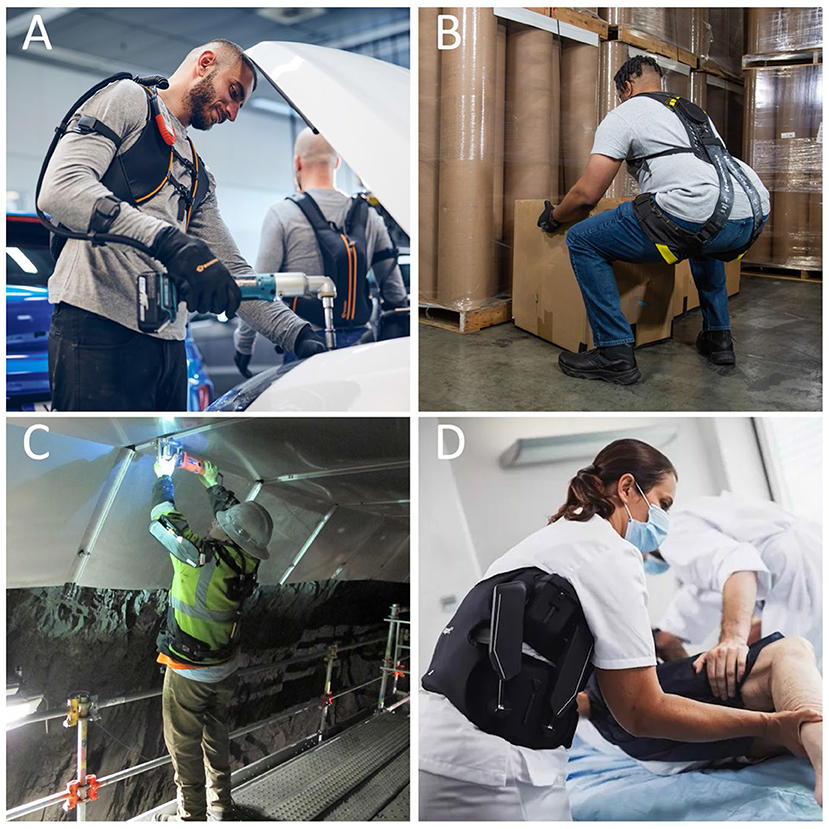
Examples of different types of occupational exoskeletons, showing (A) a soft powered hand exoskeleton used by a manufacturing worker to relieve strain when gripping tools, (B) a soft passive back exoskeleton used by a warehouse worker to reduce injury risks and fatigue, (C) a rigid passive arm exoskeleton used by a construction worker to reduce shoulder strain and fatigue during overhead work, and (D) a rigid powered trunk exoskeleton used by a healthcare worker to support their body posture and reduce back strain when moving patients

Occupational exoskeletons have primarily been developed and deployed for the purpose of reducing injuries and fatigue in the workplace. However, occupational exoskeletons may serve various purposes related to improving workplace safety or operations. The most common purposes are:

- To reduce injury risk, such as musculoskeletal disorders due to overexertion or prolonged postures
- To increase worker performance (e.g., productivity, quality, endurance) or operational efficiency
- To reduce worker turnover or enhance recruitment of new workers by improving worker well-being

Military exoskeletons are often viewed as a sub-category of occupational exoskeletons. The term military exoskeleton refers to exoskeletons that are used to support military service members in performing their job duties. Some military jobs are similar or identical to the equivalent civilian jobs. For example, a military mechanic or logistics worker may experience similar physical demands as a civilian mechanic or logistics worker. However, other jobs are unique to military service, for instance, for tank or artillery crewmembers. Physical demands associated with body armor and load carriage are also often elevated and unique for military relative to civilian jobs. For these reasons, some military exoskeletons have been developed to address military-specific jobs, environments, and challenges.

=== Recreational ===
Recreational exoskeletons serve the purpose of helping people to do or enjoy recreational activities, such as walking, hiking, skiing, or sports. In this context, an exoskeleton may help a person to do a recreational activity for longer, to do it better, to do it with less strain, pain, or fatigue, or to do a recreational activity that they would otherwise be unable to do without the assistance and support of the exoskeleton. A common goal for recreational exoskeletons is related to healthy aging, in other words, to empower people as they age and undergo natural physical decline to remain physically active and to engage in activities they enjoy. In some cases, recreational exoskeletons may be designed to resist movement to increase muscle strength training by making the movement more challenging. Recreational exoskeletons are sometimes also referred to as sports exoskeletons or consumer exoskeletons. However, some occupational and medical exoskeletons can have uses in non-professional, consumer settings so these categories can blur and some devices can fit into multiple exoskeleton categories. Recreational exoskeletons are a more nascent category (relative to medical and occupational exoskeletons) and their purpose and scope may continue to evolve over time.

=== Other ===
Exoskeletons have also been designed for other purposes. There are some exoskeletons designed primarily for research or educational purposes, and these are termed research exoskeletons and educational exoskeletons, respectively. Exoskeletons for assistance or muscle training purposes in space may be termed space exoskeletons. While these are somewhat similar to certain medical or occupational exoskeletons, they may not overlap completely. In some cases, a given exoskeleton may fit within multiple categories. As an emerging technology, exoskeleton categories are not rigidly defined. New categories or sub-categories of exoskeletons are gradually being added and refined over time.

== Categories ==
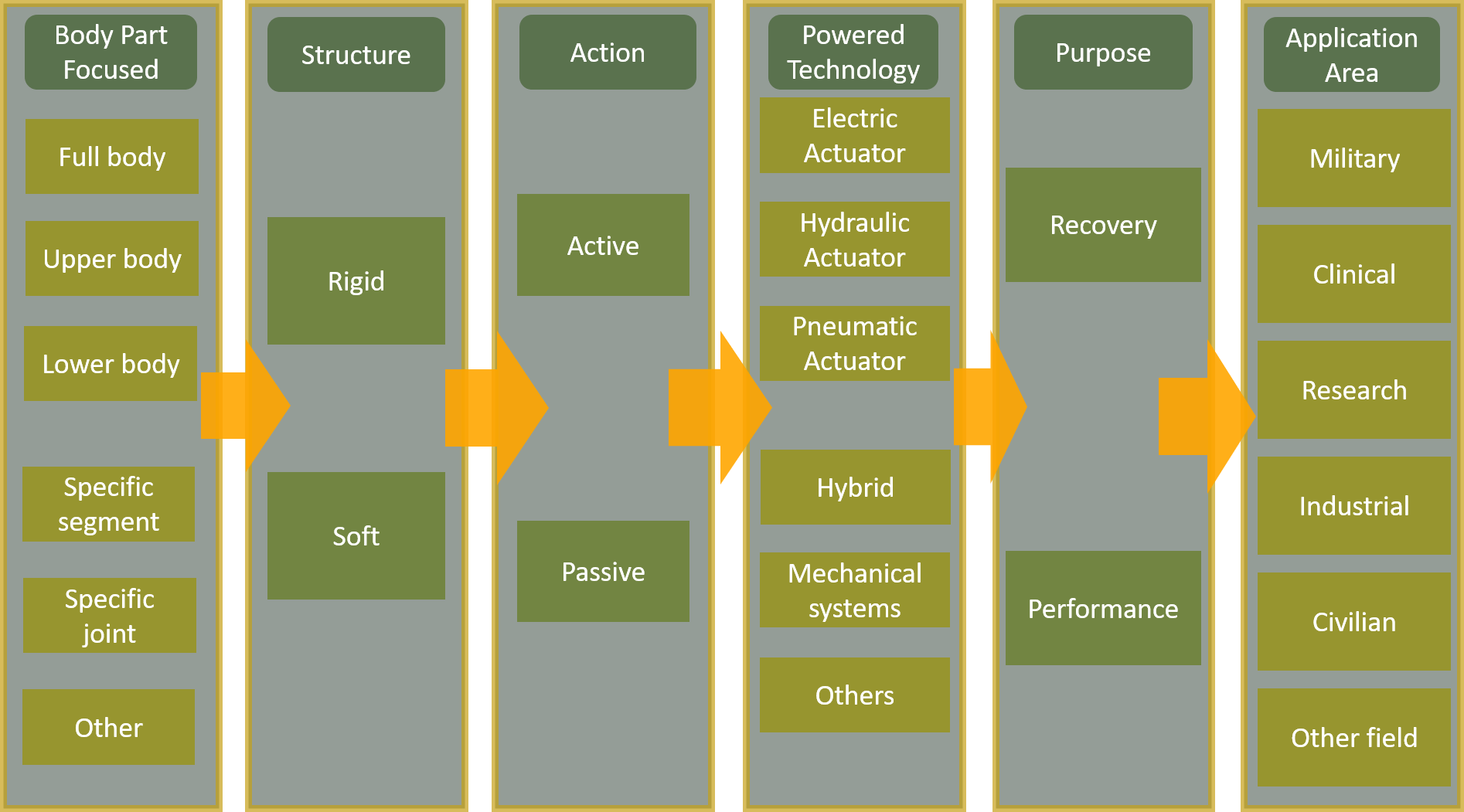
Example of how researchers have categorized exoskeletons by various characteristics

Beyond categorizing based on their general purpose or field of use, there are various other ways to categorize or sub-categorize exoskeletons. Exoskeletons exist that support different body parts and tasks, and these vary widely in terms of their size, design, control, complexity, cost, structure, function, and transportability.

=== By body parts or tasks ===
Exoskeletons have been developed to assist a wide variety of body parts and tasks, and are often categorized by these. However, unlike many Hollywood movies, real exoskeletons are not designed to do every task or to support every part of the body. In general, exoskeletons are more akin to wearable tools that are each designed to serve a specific purpose, such as to assist a subset of body parts during a subset of tasks. Thus, there are a wide variety of exoskeletons (tools) to support different types of tasks and body parts for different types of users, use cases, and environments.

There are exoskeletons that assist one or more of the following body parts: neck, shoulders, elbows, wrists, hands, fingers, back, hips, knees, ankles, and feet. Sometimes, rather than specify body parts, broader terms are used such as upper-body, lower-body, or full-body to describe an exoskeleton. There are exoskeletons designed to assist tasks or activities such as walking, running, jumping, standing, transitioning from sit-to-stand, ascending/descending stairs, bending, lifting, kneeling, holding tools, handling objects, maintaining posture, working overhead, carrying, gripping, balancing, throwing, and skiing. This list is not comprehensive, and new exoskeletons are continuously being developed to support new applications.

=== By structure ===
Example of a soft exoskeleton and rigid exoskeleton, with biomechanical force diagrams showing how each type of device works to reduce loading on the user's back

Structure refers to whether the overall construction of an exoskeleton is more rigid (i.e., hard, stiff) or softer (i.e., flexible, compliant). Exoskeletons with hard frames or composed primarily of rigid structures (e.g., metal, plastic) are generally referred to as rigid exoskeletons or traditional exoskeletons. Exoskeletons made primarily of soft structures (e.g., textiles, elastomers) are generally referred to as soft exoskeletons, also called exosuits, exo-suits, or soft-shell exoskeletons. Soft exosuits emerged as one way to try to overcome some practical challenges associated with rigid exoskeletons being cumbersome, causing discomfort, or interfering with freedom of movement. The term hybrid (soft-rigid) is occasionally used for devices that contain substantial sections composed primarily of rigid structures and separate substantial sections made primarily of soft structures. However, the term hybrid is typically used sparingly because, in reality, all exoskeletons comprise both rigid and soft components. However, for simplicity and conversational purposes, it is common to group exoskeletons into these structural categories of rigid or soft. These are colloquial categories, not formally defined.

=== By function (actuation) ===
Function (or actuation type) refers to how an exoskeleton generates the mechanical force that it exerts on the user. While all exoskeletons assist or augment human movement, they achieve this in different ways—similar to how electric motors and gasoline-powered engines can each propel a car, but they operate (actuate) differently. Exoskeletons can be actuated through powered or passive means.

Exoskeletons that generate assistive forces using an electric motor or other powered actuators (e.g., hydraulic actuators, pneumatic actuators, engines) are generally referred to as powered exoskeletons, also called active exoskeletons or motorized exoskeletons. Exoskeletons that generate assistive force using a spring, elastic material, damper, or other unpowered mechanism are generally referred to as passive exoskeletons, also called elastic exoskeletons or unpowered exoskeletons.

Each type of exoskeleton has different pros and cons. Powered exoskeletons can provide a wider range of assistance profiles beyond spring-like behaviors, which can be particularly useful for certain populations like those with paralysis and for certain tasks like pushing in one direction. However, powered exoskeletons have limited battery life and also tend to be heavier, more expensive, and provide delayed assistance due to challenges associated with control and intent recognition. Passive exoskeletons tend to be lighter, less expensive, and less restrictive to movement, and do not require recharging or refueling; however, they can only provide a subset of assistance profiles based on elastic energy storage and return.

The term quasi-passive is sometimes used to refer to a passive exoskeleton with a spring or elastic element controlled by a clutch, which allows the exoskeleton to adjust assistance levels, turn assistance from the spring on or off, or adjust the set point of the spring. Some people consider quasi-passive exoskeletons to be a sub-category of passive exoskeletons, while others view quasi-passive exoskeletons as their own separate category alongside passive and powered. This exemplifies why function should really be thought of as a continuum, but for simplicity and communication purposes a small number of functional categories are often used.

The term hybrid (powered-passive) is also occasionally used for devices that contain a subset of motorized joints and a separate subset of elastic joints. The term hybrid may also refer to devices that use powered actuation for certain motions (e.g., performing positive mechanical work) and passive mechanisms for other motions (e.g., absorbing negative work), similar to regenerative braking in cars. Regardless of the precise actuation strategy, biomechanically, all types of exoskeletons work in a similar way by generating mechanical force or torque on the user's body in a way that reduces mechanical loading and physical demands on a user's musculoskeletal system.

=== By portability ===
Transportability, or portability, refers to whether an exoskeleton is attached to the environment such that it is only usable within a limited space, or whether an exoskeleton is fully transportable and moveable. Exoskeletons that can be worn and taken anywhere are referred to as portable exoskeletons, or also called untethered or autonomous. Exoskeletons attached or affixed to the environment are referred to as tethered, stationary, or fixed exoskeletons. For instance, a tethered exoskeleton may have its actuator or power supply located off-board, such as sitting on the ground. Alternatively, the tethered connection could provide stabilization. Tethered exoskeletons are common, for instance, in the design of medical exoskeletons that are intended to be used in a clinic or hospital, and may be used in conjunction with motorized pedals or a treadmill. Transportability is a continuum, for instance, a tethered exoskeleton may have components located on a mobile cart such that it is partially but not fully portable.

=== By design and control ===
Exoskeletons can also be categorized by various technical aspects. One example is exoskeletons categorized by the level of assistance they provide. Some exoskeletons are only designed to provide slight assistance, while others provide, moderate, large, or full assistance for a given motion or task. A self-balancing exoskeleton that moves the limbs of an individual with paralysis is an example of a device that might provide full assistance. Another example is exoskeletons categorized by their type of control input, for instance, based on manual input (e.g., via a switch, joystick, or tablet), voice input, muscle activity control, force sensing, or motion sensing. Yet another example is exoskeletons categorized by their type of control strategy. Powered exoskeleton controllers may be based on torque control, position control, impedance control, or various other engineering control approaches.

=== By other characteristics ===
Exoskeletons may also be categorized by other characteristics. For example, exoskeletons can be categorized by their cost. A common misconception about exoskeletons is that they are very expensive, but in reality, exoskeletons span multiple orders of magnitude in price due to the huge variability in the size, complexity, and purposes of different devices. Exoskeletons typically range in price from hundreds of dollars (USD) to hundreds of thousands of dollars. Another example is that exoskeletons can be categorized by geography, in terms of availability or where they are manufactured. Exoskeleton availability varies by region, much like automobiles, where the same model or brand may not be offered worldwide. Regulatory approvals, distribution networks, and market demand all influence which exoskeletons are accessible in different regions. There are numerous other way to categorize exoskeletons, such as by weight, amount of modularity, or different areas of the user's body that are covered by the exoskeleton.

=== Limitations of categorization ===
One common mistake when categorizing exoskeletons is to assume that one type or subset of characteristics is inherently better or worse than another. However, there are benefits, limitations, and trade-offs associated with each of these characteristics. Knowing the device's characteristics alone is insufficient to know whether an exoskeleton is more assistive, comfortable, or effective than another. The efficacy and suitability of a specific exoskeleton depends on many aspects of the design, as well as the user and use case. There are use cases and scenarios where different types of characteristics are more or less desirable. For the avoidance of doubt, there are exoskeletons that exist and that can effectively enhance or assist movement across the full spectrums of structures (rigid to soft), functions (powered to passive), transportability levels (portable to tethered), and other characteristics.

== Design challenges and implementation considerations ==
The design of exoskeletons requires interdisciplinary expertise and perspectives, including engineering (for mechanical parts and control), apparel design (for soft goods and comfort), human factors (for safety and ergonomics), and psychology (for aesthetics and user acceptance). Because exoskeletons are wearable—and therefore cannot be too heavy, bulky, or restrictive— there are many trade-offs and considerations that must be balanced in the design process. Likewise, successful deployment of exoskeletons requires appropriate implementation, including device fitting, training, and maintenance. When organizations deploy exoskeletons at large scale, there are additional aspects of implementation that must be anticipated and planned for, related to task matching, fitting a diverse workforce, stakeholder communication, ongoing support, oversight, storage, cleaning, turnover, and change management. Deficits in design, usability, or implementation of wearable devices (including exoskeletons) can result in user rejection or abandonment of technology.

A few of the common considerations and challenges faced by exoskeleton developers and implementers are summarized below. These topics are exemplary, not comprehensive.

=== Comfort ===
Although exoskeletons are defined by their ability to assist movement or posture, one of the keys to exoskeletons being used and adopted is devices being sufficiently comfortable. Converging evidence from academic research studies and industry field studies highlights the importance of physical comfort, thermal comfort, and psychological comfort. An exoskeleton that applies forces on the user that are too high, causes chafing, or creates pressure points can be uncomfortable to users. One reason for physical discomfort can be that an exoskeleton is not the right size, or that it is not designed to fit a particular user or to fit a sufficient range of user body sizes and shapes. An exoskeleton that traps too much heat, prevents adequate air flow, or inhibits sweat evaporation can also cause thermal discomfort. If only one person (or a very small number of people) are wearing an exoskeleton, then in some cases this can cause social anxiety or psychosocial discomfort. Noise generated by an exoskeleton can also contribute to psychosocial discomfort in some environments. Any of these comfort or fit-related issues can result in exoskeleton rejection or abandonment by users. For this reason, exoskeleton comfort and fit have become high priorities in the design of exoskeletons, as well as when deploying them into society and daily life. For occupational exoskeletons and medical exoskeletons, in particular, implementation programs that involve proper training, fitting, and comfort checks have become an important part of achieving user acceptance and successful long-term adoption of exoskeletons.

=== Fit ===
Exoskeletons must be designed to fit the wide range of physical sizes to accommodate different men and women in terms of height, weight, and shape. This is particularly important given the history of personal protective equipment where gear has often not been designed to fit women as well as it fits men. Physical fit is sometimes further sub-divided into static fit and dynamic fit. Static fit refers to the alignment between human anthropometric characteristics and the exoskeleton. Dynamic fit refers to how well the human and exoskeleton move and interact with each other, with a focus on the relative alignment and coordination between the human and device. An exoskeleton might fit comfortably during static standing posture, but if it restricts or interferes with movement due to its design or control, then it would be said to have a poor dynamic fit. Cognitive fit can also be important, where this refers to the ability of the user to retain critical cognitive capabilities (e.g., human-information processing, executive function, and motor selection) while wearing an exoskeleton. There may also be other types of fit considerations, such as psychosocial fit, referring to whether a person is comfortable being seen wearing an exoskeleton in their daily or work environment.

=== Power and actuation ===
For powered exoskeletons that are not tethered, the size, weight, and type of the power supply and actuators are important considerations. For example, large battery packs can provide more electrical power but are heavy and bulky to carry. Smaller battery packs are lighter, but require frequent replacement or recharging. Batteries may also risk explosion due to thermal runaway, so other power sources may also be considered in exoskeleton design. Internal combustion engines offer high energy output, but problems include exhaust fumes, waste heat, and the inability to modulate power smoothly, as well as the periodic need to replenish volatile fuels. Hydrogen cells have been used in some exoskeleton prototypes, but also suffer from several safety problems. Actuators also face the challenges of being lightweight, yet powerful. The choice of powered actuator (e.g., servomotor, hydraulic, pneumatic) also impacts the size and weight of the exoskeleton design, the efficiency of mechanical transmission, the power supply, and the auditory noise created by the exoskeleton.

=== Control ===
Controlling exoskeletons to move in coordination with a human user is a deceptively hard task, and it is still considered to be a grand challenge in the exoskeleton field. Exoskeleton control involves sensors, algorithms, and actuators that must work together to interpret the intent of the exoskeleton wearer and then respond to assist their movement or to get out of the way to avoid interfering with movement. Many different control approaches have been explored. For example, exoskeleton control algorithms have been developed based on state-based control systems or using other intelligent control algorithms, often based on artificial intelligence, machine learning, or deep learning. Often the goal for exoskeletons to adapt to the user's gait, posture, movement, environment, or terrain. These algorithms analyze sensor data and aim to adjust exoskeleton assistance in real-time. However, it is still difficult to design exoskeletons that move in unison with the wearer in a way that is helpful, safe, does not interfere with movement, does not make many mistakes, and responds quickly and fluidly enough not to annoy (or endanger) the person wearing the device. Various exoskeleton design and user experience factors have to be considered when selecting and integrating the components of a control system and developing control algorithms.

=== Materials ===
Material selection is a challenge for exoskeleton design, since the goal is generally for these wearable devices to be strong and durable, while also being lightweight, cost-effective, and safe to worn by humans in different environments. Researchers have focused on developing advanced materials that strike a balance between flexibility, durability, and strength. Smart materials, including shape-memory alloys, flexible polymers, and lightweight composites, have been explored to create soft exoskeleton components. Appropriate material selection and integration is critical to enabling an exoskeleton to conform to a wearer's body, and achieving a comfortable fit while providing the necessary support and assistance.

=== Other considerations ===
Various other factors must also be considered in the design of exoskeletons, such as aesthetics, cost, safety, practicality, usability, weight, bulk, freedom of movement, durability, manufacturability, cleaning, maintenance, training, scalability, user pre-conceptions, and financial factors. Ultimately, exoskeleton designers are faced with the challenge of balancing dozens of different factors and trade-offs to try to develop a wearable technology that is effective, acceptable, and implementable for a set of target users.

== Fictional depictions ==
Exoskeletons have been depicted in many films, TV shows, science fiction books, and comics. However, most real-life exoskeletons differ drastically from the images and depictions in popular culture. The science fiction novel Starship Troopers by Robert A. Heinlein (1959) is sometimes credited with introducing the concept of futuristic military armor. Other examples of fictional exoskeletons include Tony Stark's Iron Man suit, the exoskeleton used by Ellen Ripley to fight the Xenomorph queen in Aliens, in Warhammer 40,000 the Space Marines, among other factions, are known to use different kinds of Power Armour, the Power Armor used in the Fallout video game franchise and the Exoskeleton from S.T.A.L.K.E.R. In some cases, these depictions have served as inspiration for exoskeleton designers and inventors. However, popular culture depictions have also led to considerable confusion, myths, and inflated expectations within the public, since many people assoociate exoskeletons with the make-believe, fantasy devices they encounter in popular culture and they may not have seen or been exposed to real-life exoskeletons. A list of these popular culture references is provided in a separate article entitled List of films featuring powered exoskeletons.

== History by century ==
=== Late 19th and early 20th ===
Wearable devices that fit the modern definition of an exoskeleton were developed in the mid to late 1800s and early 1900s. However, at the time, the term exoskeleton was not common, and the exoskeleton category was not well defined. Thus, many of the exoskeleton-like, predecessor devices were called names like braces, supporters, pedometers, or apparati. These included devices to assist posture, mobility (e.g., walking, running, jumping), physical work (e.g., bending, lifting, sitting, shoveling, tool-handling), and various body parts (e.g., legs, back, arms). These early exoskeleton-like devices spanned a wide range of structures and functions, including rigid and soft exoskeletons, and passive (elastic) and powered (active) exoskeletons. However, from the limited historical records it appears that most of these devices were prototypes or concepts, most were not commercialized, and none achieved wide adoption.

Various exoskeleton-like devices were developed between the mid 1800s and 1930s to assist with prolonged bending posture and other common agricultural work tasks. These included both rigid exoskeleton-like devices and soft exosuit-like devices. Some of these devices were fully on-body devices and worked by providing assistive forces and torques in parallel with the user's muscles, while other devices assisted by transmitting forces to the ground, for instance, during seated posture or stooping. There were also a variety of tool-handling exoskeleton-like devices, for holding items such as rifles, fishing rods, and umbrellas.

During this same period, there were also exoskeleton-like devices designed to facilitate walking, running, or other locomotor activities. These included both rigid and soft devices, as well as devices that were both passive (elastic) and powered (active). One example of an early passive rigid exoskeleton-like device was an apparatus developed around 1890 by Russian engineer Nicholas Yagin. This device consisted of bow springs connected between the user's waist and feet, and was intended to use elastic energy storage and return to assist walking, running, or jumping. Yagin developed several other related inventions. An example of an early powered soft exosuit-like device was an apparatus developed by United States inventor Leslie Kelley around 1917 to augment running. This device consisted of a backpack-worn steam engine (powered actuator), which assisted the user by controlling and transmitting mechanical power to wires (artificial ligaments) that ran in parallel with the user's muscles. Various other exoskeleton-like devices were developed to facilitate locomotion or assist people with physical disabilities.

=== Mid 20th ===
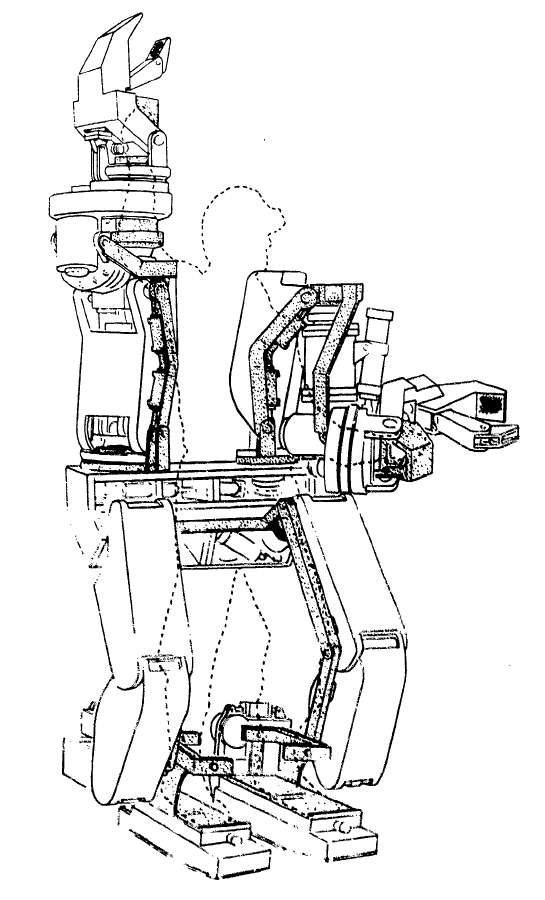
Concept drawing of the Hardiman I, which was built but never used by humans due to its "violent and uncontrollable" motion

Exoskeleton-like devices continued to be developed throughout the middle of the 20th century. This marked a period of exploration into the possibilities and challenges of wearable assistive technologies for human augmentation and rehabilitation purposes. This period also marked the emergence of one of the first exoskeleton success stories, in the form of wearable camera stabilizers. However, this was a niche solution and there was no broader exoskeleton market at the time, so this technology largely developed and matured as its own category. Even today, camera stabilizers are generally considered their own category and not included as exoskeletons, despite fitting the definition.

In 1951, the U.S. Army Ballistics Research Laboratory (BRL) initiated a study of powered exoskeletons to aid soldiers, and by 1963, BRL's researcher S. Zaroodny published a report where he proposed a design for a powered exoskeleton and evaluation of a pneumatically powered prototype device. Although the project was not pursued further, the report systematically analyzed the engineering challenges of creating an exoskeleton device to enhance human performance.

In the 1960s, another exoskeleton called the Hardiman gained notoriety due to its level of sophistication, though it was not commercialized. It was co-developed by General Electric and the US Armed Forces. This exoskeleton was powered by hydraulics and electricity and amplified the wearer's strength by a factor of 25, so that lifting 110 kilograms (240 lb) would feel like lifting 4.5 kilograms (10 lb). A feature called force feedback enabled the wearer to feel the forces and objects being manipulated. However, the Hardiman had major limitations, including its 680-kilogram (1,500 lb) weight. The Hardiman was designed as a master-slave system consisting of a set of overlapping exoskeletons: the slave device (outer exoskeleton) followed the motions of the master device (inner exoskeleton), which followed the motion of the human operator. The response time for the slave suit was slow, and control issues caused "violent and uncontrollable motion by the machine" when moving both legs simultaneously. Hardiman's slow walking speed of 0.76 meters per second (2.5 ft/s) further limited practical uses.

During this time, various other exoskeletons were also being developed, which varied widely in design and characteristics; however, these were also mostly for research and demonstration purposes. There was also exploration into development and use of exoskeletons for clinical populations. For instance, in the 1970s Yugoslavia by a team led by Prof. Miomir Vukobratović developed pneumatically powered and electronically controlled lower limb devices to assist in the rehabilitation of people with paralysis.

In the 1970s, wearable camera stabilizers were developed and popularized. These could be considered to be a type of tool-holding exoskeleton. Wearable camera stabilizers work biomechanically by redirecting some or all the weight of the camera down to the user's trunk or waist. This load path bypasses, and thereby reduces musculoskeletal loading on, the shoulders and arms of the user. Wearable camera stabilizers could be considered one of the first exoskeleton-like devices that was widely adopted in society and within a specific industry.

=== Late 20th ===
Exoskeleton development continued in the 1980s and 1990s, with various devices developed and futuristic concepts conceived. But most exoskeletons of this era were still not commercialized products, rather they were evolving testbeds and exploratory prototypes. Rigid and powered exoskeletons were a major focus during this period, as was the exploration of advanced robotic and control capabilities. A couple notable and representative exoskeletons of this period are summarized below.

In the 1980s, Los Alamos National Laboratory engineers proposed a futuristic exoskeleton called Pitman, a powered exoskeleton suit of armor for military infantry. The design included brain-scanning sensors in the helmet, but was considered too complex and impractical. It was never built. Another 1980s exoskeleton was the Lifesuit, which was a robotic rehabilitation device to help people with paralysis to perform therapy exercises intended to help them regain mobility and learn to walk. Dozens of Lifesuit prototypes were built over the course of multiple decades, highlighting the iterative and evolving nature of exoskeleton technology during this period. Lifesuit was initially tethered but later developed into a portable exoskeleton, which the inventor (an individual with paralysis) used to walk in public road races. However, the inventor also recounted being injured (lacerated) by one of the prototypes during an experimental walking trial. This incident highlights the importance of safety, which was a major focus of exoskeleton design and validation testing over the following decades.

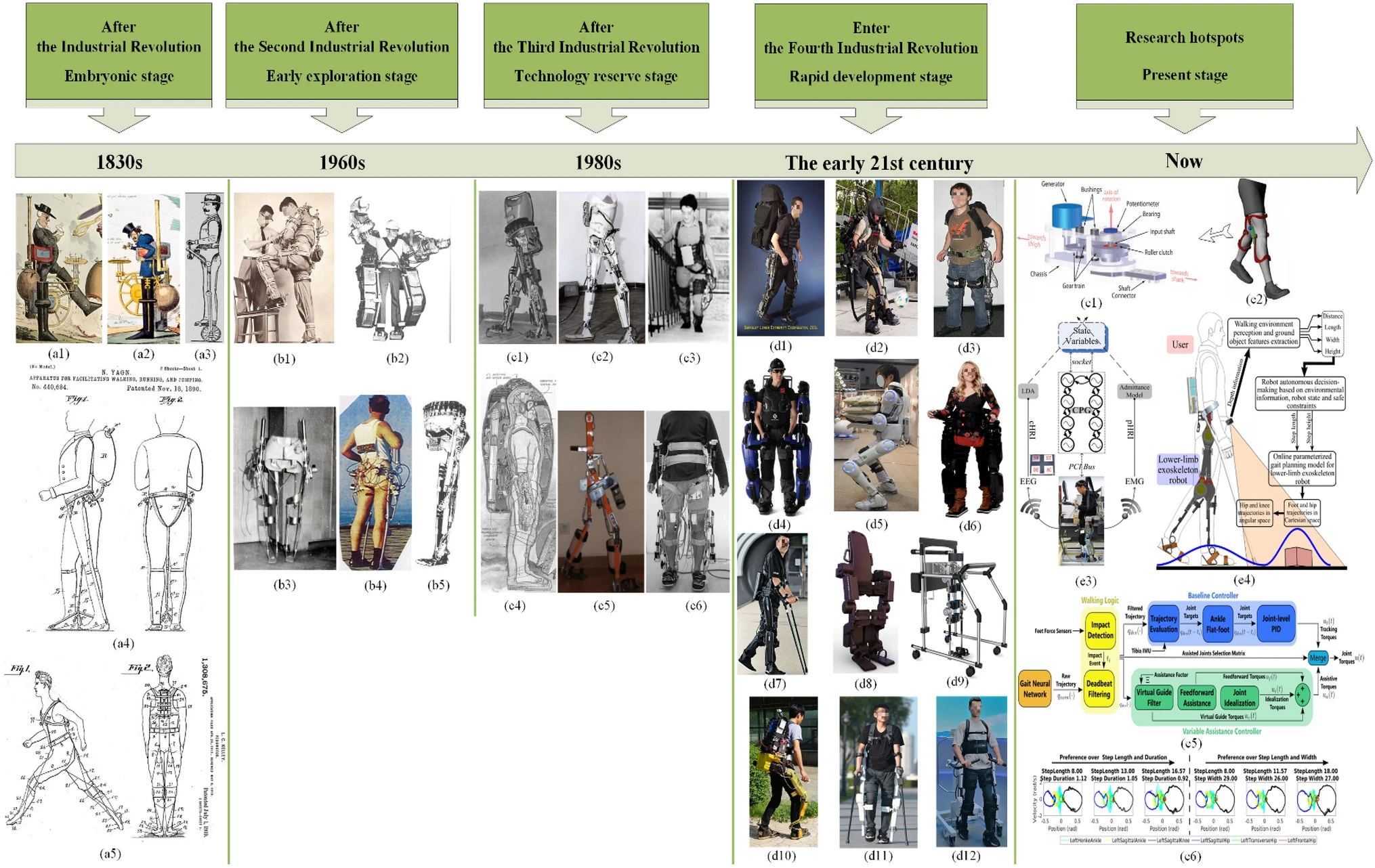
A brief, partial history of lower extremity robotic (powered) exoskeletons

Many other exoskeletons were conceived and developed during this era, leveraging the technological advances of the time to move forward the engineering and technical aspects of exoskeletons. However, real-world and widespread use of exoskeletons were still decades away at the turn of the century. Many of the challenges related to user experience, usability, comfort, and implementation in the real-world were not yet priorities and had still not yet been addressed. These became key focus areas for improvement and advancement in the 21st century.

=== Early 21st ===
From 2000 to the early 2020's, the focus of the exoskeleton field shifted and expanded, and there were major advances in the design, implementation, and adoption of exoskeletons. However, amongst the general public, there still continues to be many myths and misconceptions about modern exoskeletons—in part due to how exoskeletons have been portrayed in film and science fiction literature.

During the early 21st century, the focus on robotic, full-body, human augmentation exoskeletons that drastically alter human performance diminished, and there was a growing trend toward designing smaller, simpler exoskeletons to serve as wearable tools for specific uses and needs.

Between 2000 and 2020, there were several high-profile, full-body (or full-lower-body) powered exoskeletons developed to try to significantly increase human strength and performance. These included devices like TALOS, SARCOS, BLEEX, and HULC. Despite some impressive technical capabilities, these devices had a number of major limitations related to bulk, cost, complexity, usability, intent recognition, control, and movement interference. Ultimately, none of these exoskeletons were commercialized. However, several powered medical exoskeletons for people who were paralyzed or with other mobility impairments were successfully developed and commercialized (e.g., Rewalk, Vanderbilt exoskeleton), with RaWalk being the first device receiving FDA approval in 2014. ReWalk was developed by an Israeli company that created one of the world's first FDA approved robotic exoskeletons for paralyzed patients.

Most modern exoskeletons (i.e., devices from about 2020 and onward) are smaller, simpler, and more practical than their predecessors, and differ greatly from most people's preconceptions about exoskeletons. The design focus of exoskeletons during this era was no longer on maximizing power, strength, augmentation, or futuristic capabilities, but instead on solving specific problems, being comfortable and practical to use, and increasing user adoption. This reflected a general recognition and converging evidence within the field that if exoskeletons were going to become more widely adopted, then aspects like comfort, ease of use, cost, simplicity, and practicality were going to be as important, or more important, than aspects like technical specifications, assistance levels, or futuristic capabilities.

In many ways, the modern exoskeleton field has deviated from Hollywood narratives and fantasy depictions of exoskeletons, and moved in a different direction. The vast majority of modern exoskeletons are more like wearable tools than like super suits or Hollywood exoskeletons (e.g., Iron Man, Edge of Tomorrow).

These wearable tools offer certain benefits but only for limited or specific use cases. For instance, if a person has calf muscle weakness after a stroke, then they might benefit from using an ankle exoskeleton. If a person works overhead on a manufacturing assembly line, then they might benefit from using a shoulder exoskeleton. If a person does material handling in a warehouse or distribution center, they might benefit from using a back exoskeleton.

Most exoskeletons are not intended to be worn all-day, every-day, but instead to be used (like most other tools) for specific purposes and during a subset of tasks or activities. Therefore, most modern exoskeleton are designed to support a specific area of the body or subset of tasks, not to augment the entire body or to enhance all movements or activities.

There have been several key exoskeleton trends during the early 21st century. Powered exoskeletons became light enough and affordable enough to be usable for some medical, industrial, and recreational purposes. Medical exoskeletons demonstrated sufficient safety to obtain regulatory approval (e.g., FDA approval) and sufficient benefits to receive medical reimbursement for specific uses. Passive exoskeletons grew in popularity due to being lighter, more affordable, and less complicated than powered exoskeletons. Soft exoskeletons grew in popularity due to being lighter, less bulky, and less restrictive than rigid exoskeletons. There was a heightened focus on how to best implement exoskeletons in society, by considering aspects like device fitting, training, educating stakeholders, social acceptance, maintenance, cleaning, financials, and change management. Real-world exoskeleton usage grew significantly, particularly in medical and occupational settings, from negligible usage around 2000 to an estimated hundreds of thousands of exoskeletons now being used globally in the mid-2020s, with the expectation that exoskeleton usage will grow into the millions by the 2030s.

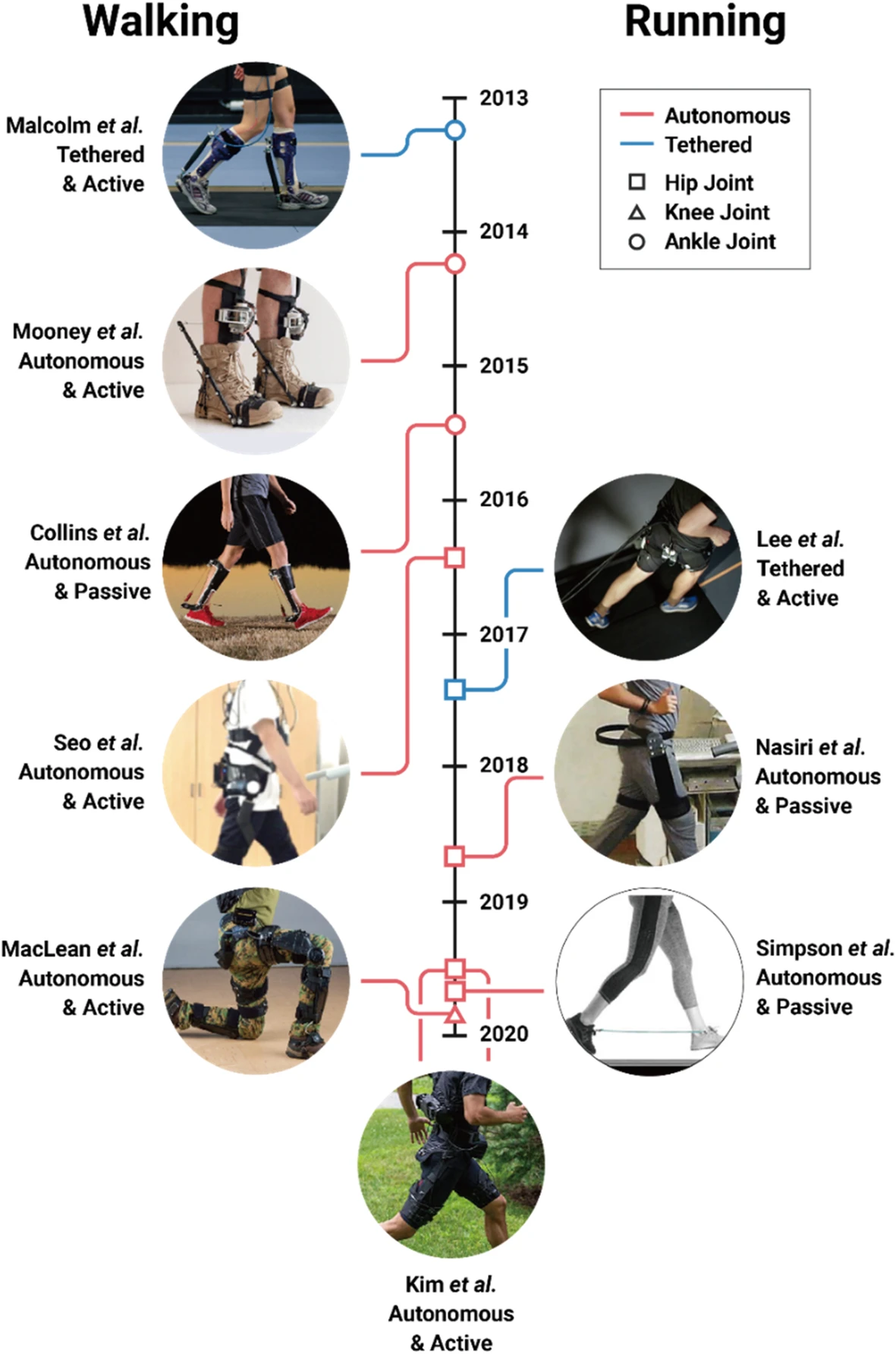
A brief, partial history of lower limb exoskeletons between 2013 to 2020, highlighting tethered (blue) and untethered (red) exoskeletons that were studied and found to improve walking and/or running economy relative to not wearing an exoskeleton

In the early 21st century, research on exoskeletons grew significantly and established the scientific and clinical foundations related to safety, benefits, and efficacy. Universities and medical centers around the world played a pivotal role in the foundational research and development, followed by a trend towards more large-scale and long-term studies on exoskeletons in industry, clinics, and daily life. There is now considerable academic and industry research along with scientific and longitudinal evidence underlying exoskeleton impacts on rehabilitation, performance enhancement, and injury risk reduction.

The early 21st century has also witnessed the emergence of new exoskeleton categories, for instance, recreational, research, and educational exoskeletons. Although some of these devices have been conceptualized for a long time, they only recently began entering the commercial market. Recreational exoskeleton concepts, for instance, date back to at least the 1800s, but did not become commercially available until the early 21st century. In the late 2010s, skiing exoskeleton products emerged to help people enjoy skiing for a longer period or with less strain on their knees. In the early 2020's, exoskeleton products to assist walking, running, or hiking also began to emerge. Some recreational exoskeletons are sold directly to consumers, whereas others are sold to businesses such as ski lodges or hiking parks, then provided as a rental option to visitors. As of early 2025, many of these recreational exoskeletons to assist ambulation were still at the pre-product stage or were products that just recently launched into the commercial market.

As of 2025, there are over 100 exoskeleton products on the market, which range widely in terms of size, complexity, cost, and other characteristics. However, as some new products enter the market and others exit the market or are replaced by newer models, it is challenging to track the precise number of exoskeleton products available. These different exoskeletons are developed and manufactured by dozens of different companies around the globe, which range from start-ups to established companies. There is also a growing network of companies that specialize in distributing, reselling, or implementing exoskeletons.

Most modern exoskeletons are for medical, recreational, or occupational applications. Modern medical exoskeletons serve a variety of assistive and rehabilitative uses and have regulatory approvals and insurance reimbursement codes in various countries. Modern recreational exoskeletons have been developed for skiing, walking, hiking, and running. Modern occupational exoskeletons exist to support a person's legs, back, arms, hands, or neck, or for tool-handling, during physically demanding work. There is longitudinal and converging evidence that, for certain jobs, occupational exoskeletons can reduce workplace musculoskeletal disorders and enhance worker performance and productivity. However, as of 2025, exoskeletons are still considered an emerging technology in the workplace. Occupational exoskeletons are either implemented as a wearable workplace tool or as an ergonomic control to supplement traditional ergonomic programs or interventions. As with any emerging technology, exoskeletons have witnessed a combination of successes and failures in the early 21st century. However, overall, the exoskeleton market is experiencing robust growth and exoskeletons are gradually becoming more visible and common in society.

== See also ==
- Assistive technology – Assistive devices for people with disabilities
- Atmospheric diving suit – Articulated pressure-resistant anthropomorphic housing for an underwater diver
- Back brace – Corrective medical device worn around a patient's back
- Bionics – Application of natural systems to technology
- Future Force Warrior
- List of emerging technologies
- Mecha – Humanoid walking vehicles
- Pneumatics – Use of pressurised gas in mechanical systems
- Soft robotics – Subfield of robotics
- Steadicam – Motion picture camera stabilizer mounts
- Third Arm Weapon Interface System (TAWIS)
- Walking Truck, experimental quadrupedal vehicle; also known as the "Cybernetic Anthropomorphous Machine"
