= M240 machine gun =

U.S. Military adopted variant of the FN MAG

Medium Machine Gun, 7.62 mm, M240
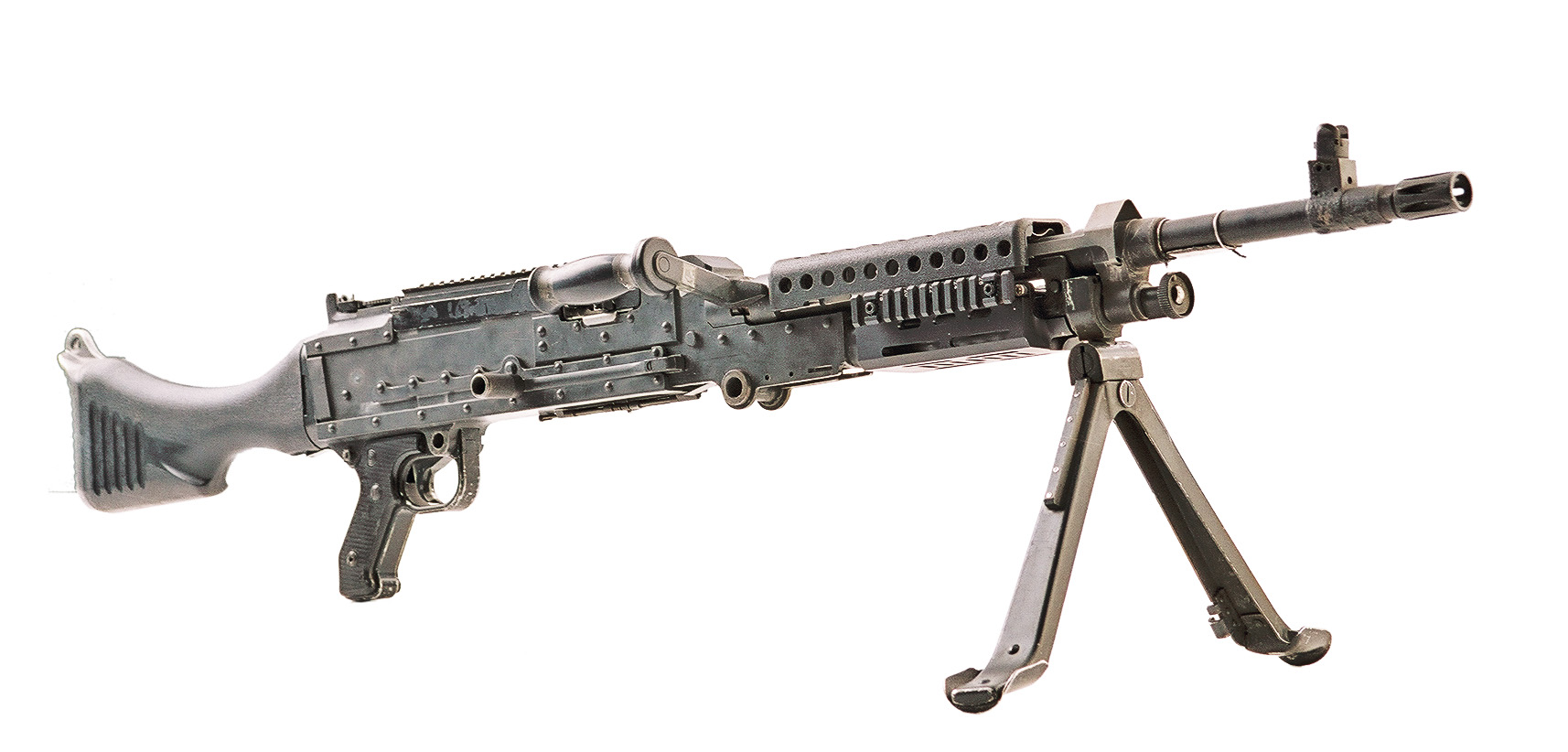
- M240B with its bipod deployed
- Type: General-purpose machine gun Medium machine gun
- Place of origin: Belgium (designed); United States (manufactured)

Service history
- In service: 1977–present
- Used by: See Users
- Wars: Operation Urgent Fury; Operation Just Cause; First Liberian Civil War; Gulf War; War in Afghanistan; Iraq War; Syrian Civil War; War in Iraq (2013–2017); Russo-Ukrainian War

Production history
- Designer: Ernest Vervier
- Designed: 1950s
- Manufacturer: FN America; U.S. Ordnance; Barrett Firearms Manufacturing; Daycraft Systems
- Unit cost: US$6,600
- Produced: 1977–present
- Variants: See Variants

Specifications
- Mass: 27.6 lb (12.5 kg) (M240B)
- Length: 49.7 in (1,260 mm)
- Barrel length: 24.8 in (630 mm)
- Width: 4.7 in (120 mm)
- Height: 10.4 in (260 mm)
- Cartridge: 7.62×51mm NATO
- Action: Gas-operated long-stroke piston, open bolt
- Rate of fire: 550–650 rounds/min: Single port; 650–750 rounds/min: Gas setting 1; 750–850 rounds/min: Gas setting 2; 850–950 rounds/min: Gas setting 3
- Muzzle velocity: 2,800 ft/s (853 m/s)
- Effective firing range: 800–1,800 m (875–1,969 yd) depending on mount
- Maximum firing range: 3,725 m (4,074 yd)
- Feed system: Belt-fed using M13 disintegrating links, 50-round ammo pouch, or non-disintegrating DM1 belt
- Sights: Iron sights: front blade and folding rear leaf with aperture and notch

The M240, officially the Medium Machine Gun, 7.62 mm, M240, is the U.S. military designation for the FN MAG, a family of belt-fed, gas-operated medium machine guns that chamber the 7.62×51mm NATO cartridge.

The M240 has been used by the United States Armed Forces since the late 1970s. It is used extensively by infantry, most often in rifle companies, as well as on ground vehicles, watercraft and aircraft. Though it is heavier than some comparable machine guns, it is highly regarded for reliability and its standardization among NATO members is a major advantage.

All variants are fed from disintegrating belts and are capable of firing most types of 7.62 NATO ammunition. M240 variants can be converted to use non-disintegrating belts. There are significant differences in weight and some features among some versions which restrict the interchangeability of parts. The M240s used by the U.S. military are currently manufactured by U.S. Ordnance in Reno, NV as well as FN America, the American subsidiary of the Belgian company FN Herstal.

The M240B and M240G are usually fired from integrated bipods, tripods, or vehicular mounts; regarding tripod use, the U.S. Army primarily uses the M192 lightweight ground mount, while the U.S. Marine Corps uses the M122A1 tripod, a slightly updated M2 tripod.

== History ==
=== Development ===
Manufactured by the American division of the Belgian company Fabrique Nationale d'Herstal, the FN MAG was chosen by the U.S. military for different roles after large worldwide searches and competitions. The MAG is a belt-fed, gas-operated, air-cooled, crew-served, general-purpose machine gun. Its versatility is demonstrated by its ability to be fired effectively from its integral bipod, mounted on a tripod, on ground vehicles, watercraft and aircraft.

It was first adopted by the U.S. Army in 1977, as a coaxial tank gun, and slowly adopted for more applications in the 1980s and 1990s. The M240 and M240E1 were adopted for use on vehicles. This led to further adoption in more uses, especially for the Army and Marine Corps infantry.

While possessing many of the same basic characteristics as its predecessor, the durability of the MAG system results in superior reliability when compared to the M60. The MAG actually has a more complex gas system than the M60, but gives better reliability combined with lower maintenance requirements, though this comes at greater manufacturing cost and weight.

Compared to other machine guns, its rating of 26,000 mean rounds between failure (MRBF) is quite high for its weight – in the 1970s when it was first adopted it achieved about 7,000 MRBF. It is not as reliable as some very heavy older designs, but it is quite reliable for its mass.

=== Testing and adoption ===
The U.S. adoption of the MAG has its origins in the late 1960s and early 1970s as a project to procure a new coaxially mounted 7.62 mm machine gun for tanks to replace the M73 and M219 machine guns then being used. The 1950s-era M73 had been rather troublesome, and the derivative M73E1/M219 was not much of an improvement. A number of designs of the period from various countries were considered; the final two candidates were the M60E2 and the FN MAG, which underwent comprehensive testing alongside the older M219 for comparison.

Two main criteria analyzed were "mean rounds between stoppages" (MRBS, malfunctions that can be cleared within minutes) and "mean rounds between failures" (MRBF, such as a part breaking). The results for the evaluated machine guns were the following:

Type	Rounds fired	MRBS	MRBF
FN MAG 58	50,000	2,962	6,442
M60E2	50,000	846	1,669
M219	19,000	215	1,090
Minimum specified		850	2,675
Minimum desired		1,750	5,500

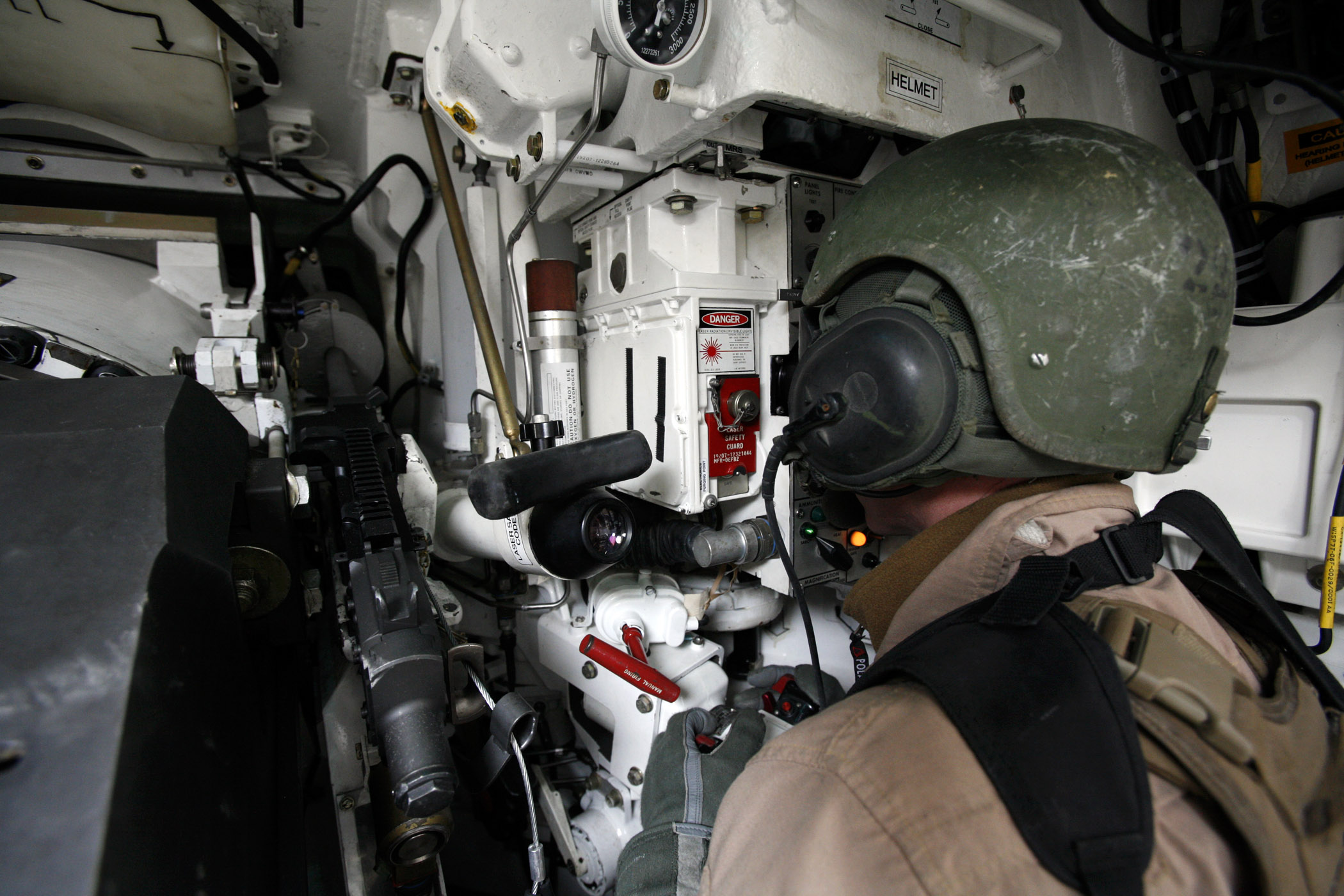
M240 coaxial machine gun aboard an M1 Abrams tank

The FN MAG underwent several improvements, while the M60E2 was a specialized coaxial variant that differed from some of the other types. The qualities of the M60 variants vary considerably, such as between the M60E4 and the M60C. The clear winner was the FN MAG, which was designated as the M240 in 1977 after the U.S. Army competition.

The M240 was adopted as the U.S. Army's standard coaxial machine gun for tanks and armored vehicles in 1977. The Marine Corps also adopted the M240 and M240E1 for use on vehicles like the LAV-25. It then went on to replace many older types of vehicle machine guns in the 1980s. U.S. Navy SEALs continued to use the "CAR-60" (M60E3) version of the M60 machine gun due to its lighter weight and slower rate of fire, which allows a more effective duration of fire with allowable levels of ammunition carried.

The M240 proved popular enough that it was adapted by the infantry later on, as the M240G and M240B. The USMC adopted the M240G for this role in 1991, where it not only replaced the original M60s used by the Marine Corps infantry, but also the upgraded M60E3 that the Marines had started using in the 1980s. In the late 1990s, the Army adopted the M240B for the infantry role – they had considered the M60E4, which (though lighter and cheaper) did not offer commonality with the vehicle-borne M240, other FN MAG users within NATO, or the USMC.

The various versions of the M240 have not entirely replaced all the M60 versions, though they have for most main applications and roles. The M60 is still, in some cases, used by the Navy.

==== 2022 military solicitation ====
As of March 2022, the United States Army had a solicitation ongoing for a M240 machine gun 6.8×51mm conversion kit to modify the 7.62×51mm NATO-chambered M240B and M240L general-purpose machine guns to fire the 6.8×51mm ammunition.

== Design details ==
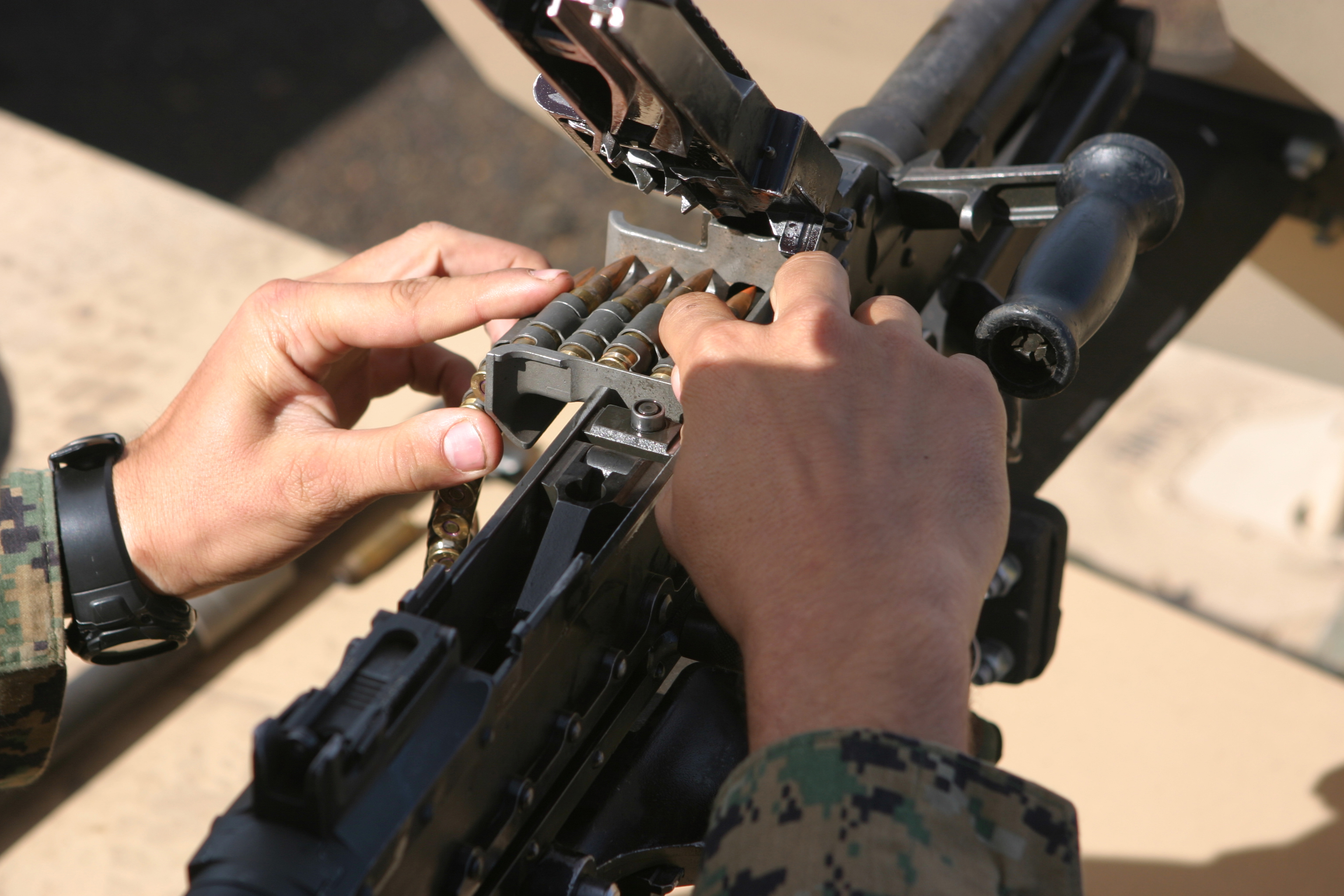
A US Marine inserts an ammunition belt into the feed tray of the M240G

The M240 fires from the open bolt position, meaning that the bolt is held to the rear and only moves forward as it is firing a round. The firing pin is static and the bolt moves around the firing pin, circumventing any need for a hammer. A sear is used to time the internal mechanisms of the machine gun to provide a consistent rate of fire, ensuring proper function and accuracy.

The rate of fire may be controlled by three different gas regulator settings. The first setting allows the machine gun to cycle at 650–750 rounds per minute, the second setting being 750–850 rounds per minute, and the third setting being 850–950 rounds per minute. These settings are changed by dismounting the barrel, removing the gas regulator collar and turning the gas regulator to allow more or less gas to move through the machine gun system. It is generally performed only when necessary to return the gun to operation after fouling has caused sluggish operation and there is no time to properly clean the machine gun.

The barrels can be exchanged rapidly, via a barrel release button located on the left side of the machine gun. The machine gun is cleared first and then the button is held down, while the barrel's carrying handle is moved from the right side of the machine gun to the center, unlocking it from the receiver. At this point, the button is released and the barrel is then pulled free of the receiver and placed to the side. The new barrel is inserted into the receiver and then the carrying handle is shifted to the right, locking it into place.

During prolonged firing, the barrels can become hot enough to inflict second-degree burns instantly without becoming visibly different.

== Variants ==
FN Herstal first introduced the MAG general-purpose machine gun in the early 1950s. The M240 is the US military's adoption of the FN MAG. Parts compatibly of other MAG variants adopted by other NATO members are interchangeable. This has significant advantages in training, logistics support, tactical versatility, and joint operations.

=== M240 ===
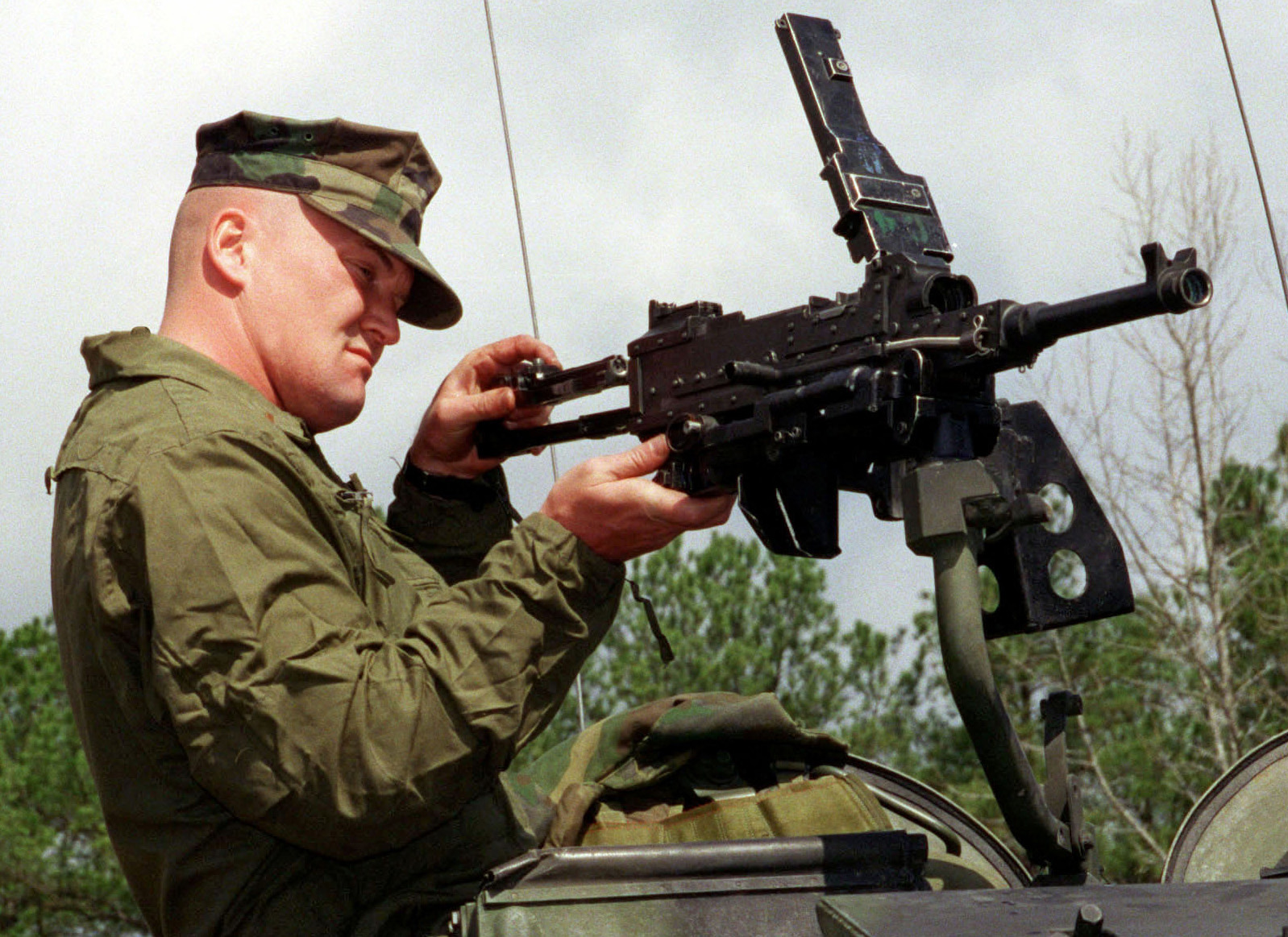
A Marine performs maintenance on a mounted M240 pintle-mounted machine gun on a LAV

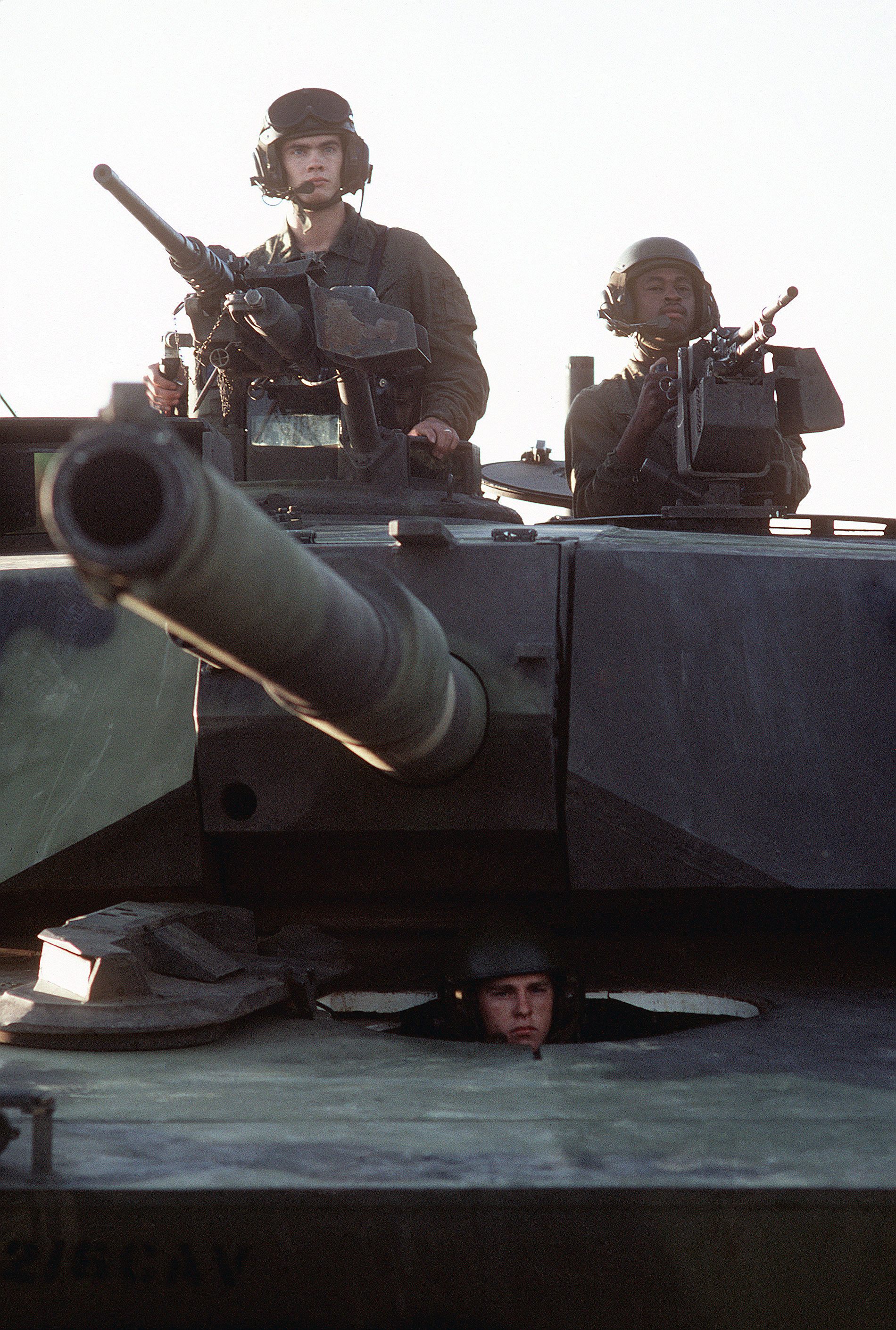
An M1 Abrams tank with the tank commander's .50-caliber M2 Browning machine gun on the right side of the tank, and the ammunition loader's M240 on the left side of the tank. A second M240 (barely visible) is mounted coaxially next to the main gun

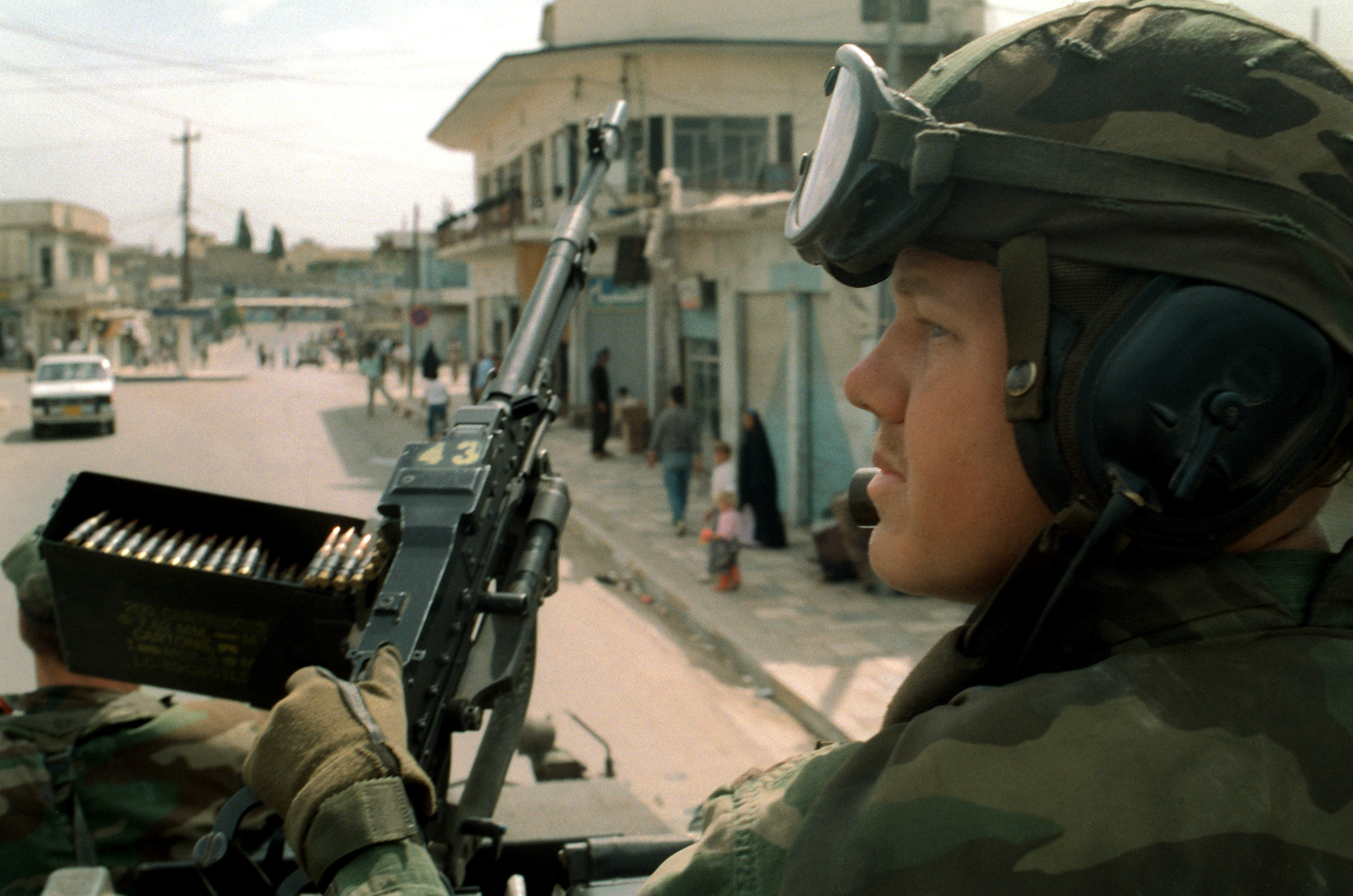
M240E1 variant on a LAV-25

The M240 is adapted as a coaxial machine gun for tanks and 7.62 mm fire power on light armored vehicles. The M240 is part of the secondary armament on the U.S. Army M1 series Abrams tank, M2/M3 series Bradley Fighting Vehicle, and the U.S. Marine Corps LAV-25.

The M240E1 is the U.S. Marine Corps version of the original M240 coaxial/pintle-mounted machine gun that is used on vehicles like the LAV-25. It can also be fitted with spade grips for flexible use, like the ones from the M240D.

The M240C is the right-hand variant on the original coaxial (installed alongside the main machine gun) M240, it is identical to the M240 except for the ammunition cover and feed tray. It has a right-handed feed for use on the M2/M3 Bradley Fighting Vehicle and LAV as the coaxial machine gun. It is fed from the left on the M1 Abrams and other M1 variant (M1A1, M1A2, M1A2 SEP) tanks. The M240C uses a charging cable instead of a charging handle, has a cut-off pistol grip and has a special paddle assembly that allows the trigger to be actuated by means of a solenoid. Since the machine gun is not meant to be handled during use, the barrel is fully exposed and must be handled with asbestos mittens during barrel changes.

The rate of fire of the M240, M240E1, and M240C can be controlled by three different gas regulator settings;

- The first setting allows the machine gun to have a cyclic rate of fire of around 650–750 rounds per minute,
- The second setting allows the machine gun to have a cyclic rate of fire of around 750–850 rounds per minute,
- The third setting allows the machine gun to have a cyclic rate of fire of around 850–950 rounds per minute.

=== M240B ===
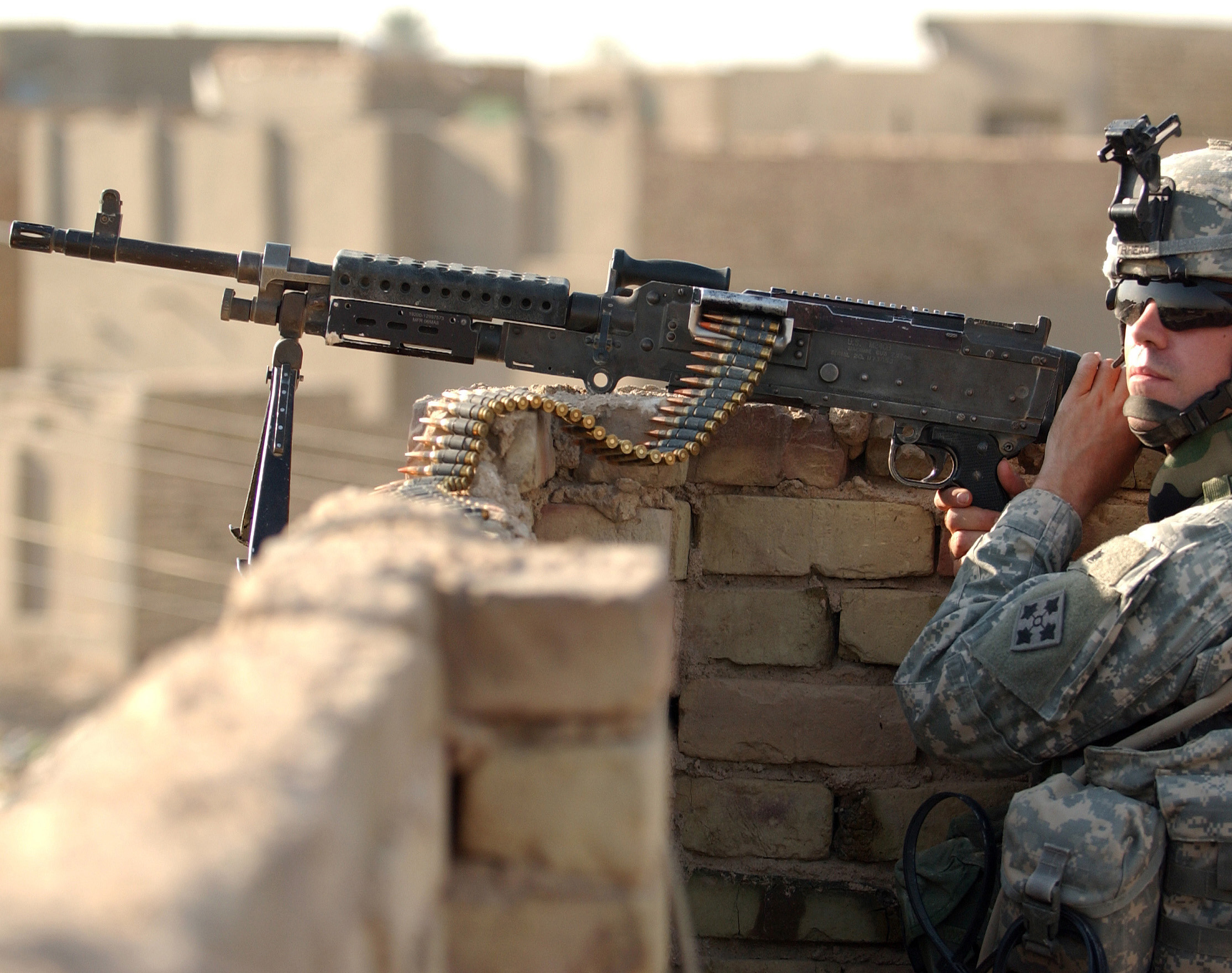
An M240B in use by a U.S. Army soldier

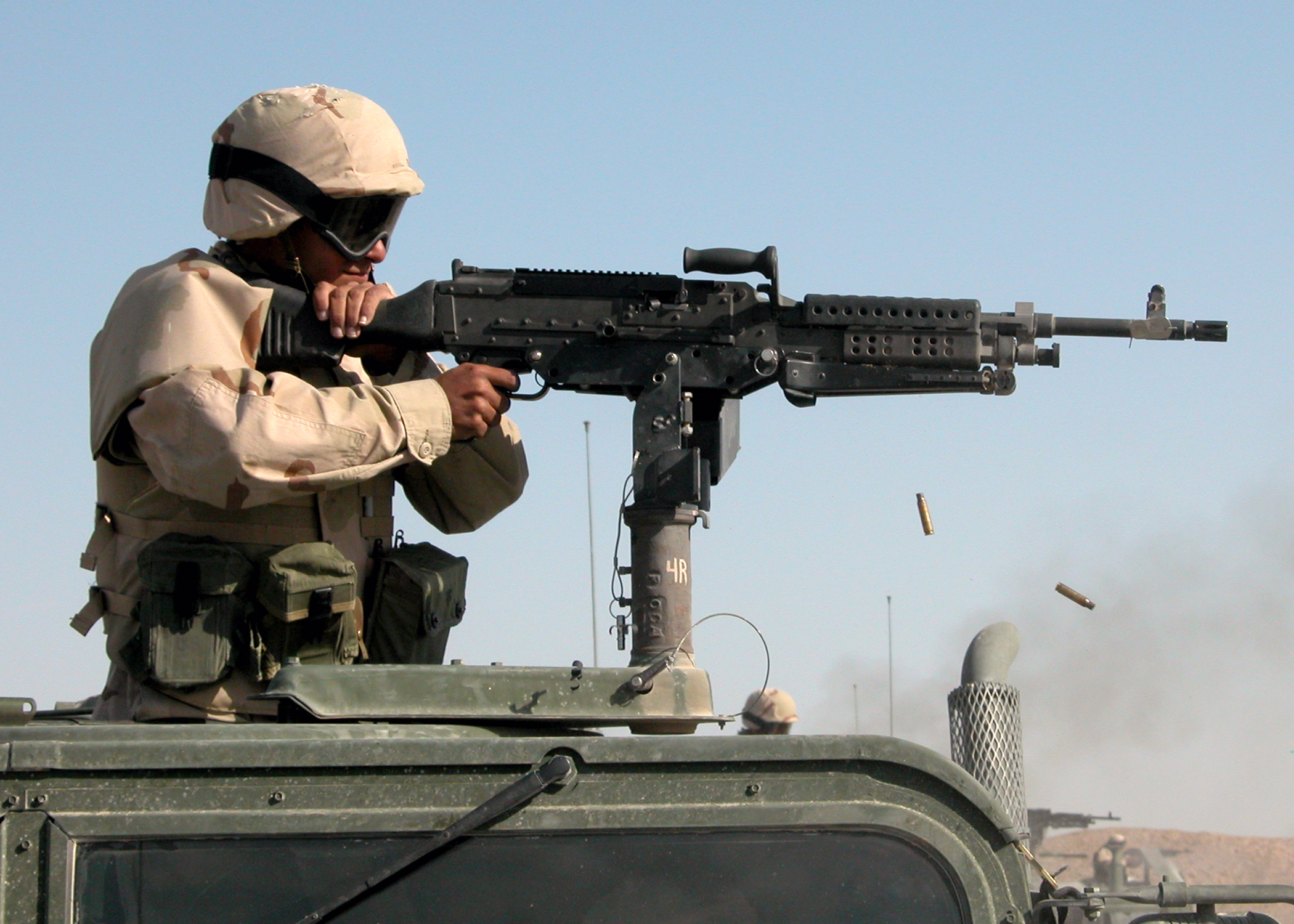
A Seabee fires an M240B mounted atop a Humvee

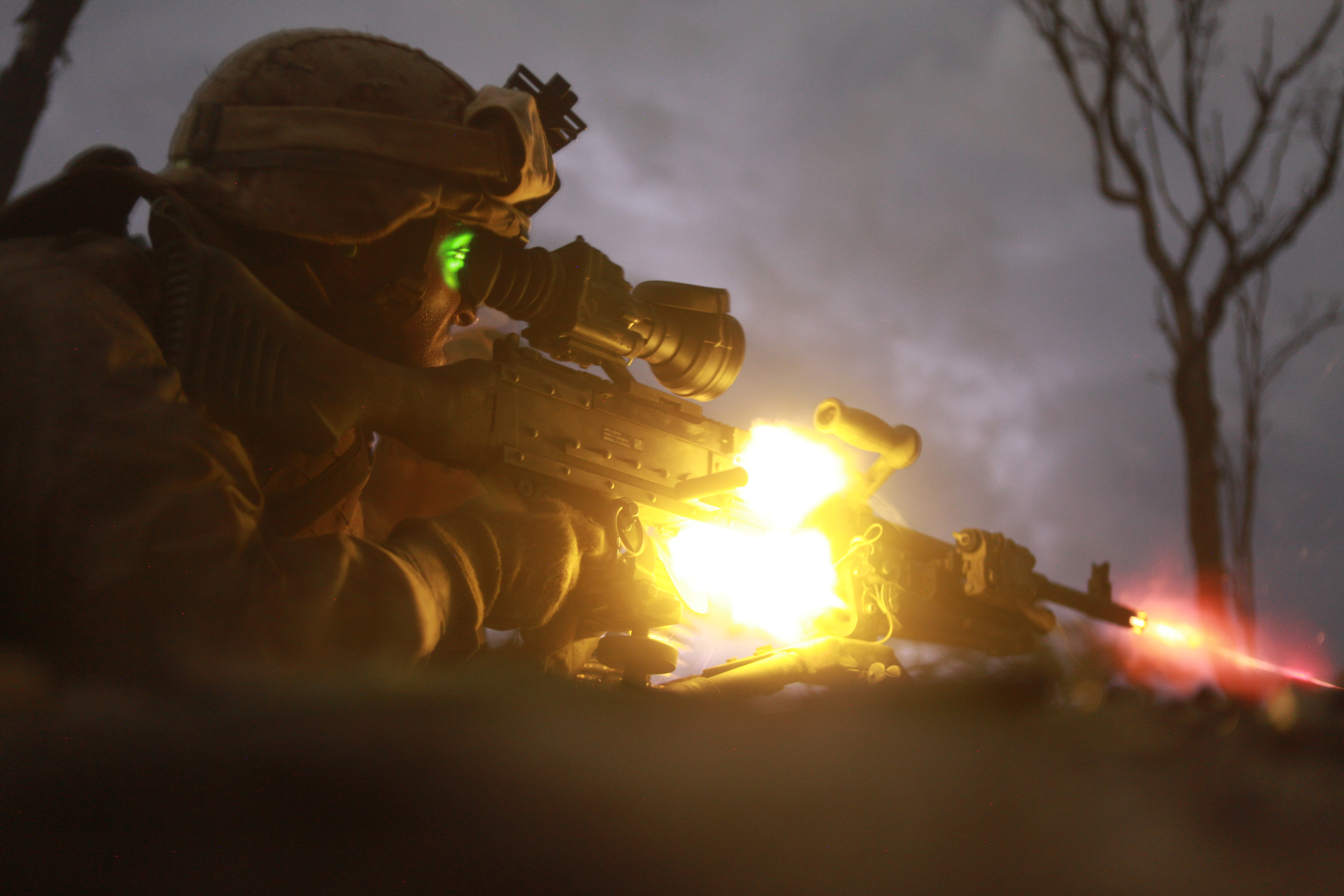
U.S. Marine firing an M240B with an AN/PVS-17C

The M240B (M240 Bravo), formerly designated as the M240E4 is the standard infantry medium machine gun of the U.S. Marine Corps. The U.S. Navy and Coast Guard likewise utilize the machine gun system, and is also still used by some units in the U.S. Army. It comes configured for ground combat with a buttstock and bipod, though it can also be mounted on tripod, ground vehicles, aircraft, aboard ships, and small boats.

The M60E4 (Mk 43 as designated by the Navy) was pitted against the M240E4 (former designation of the M240B) in the Army trials during the 1990s for a new infantry medium machine gun, in a competition to replace the decades-old M60s. The M240E4 won, and was then classified as the M240B. This led to 1,000 existing M240s being sent to FN for an overhaul and a special kit that modified them for use on ground (such as a stock, rail systems, etc.). This led to procurement contracts in the late 1990s for the all-new M240B. However, a new feature was added, a hydraulic buffer system to reduce the felt recoil as incorporated in the M60. While the M240B had been more reliable in the tests, it was a few pounds heavier than the M60E4, which led to the development of the lighter M240L. The Army M240 converted to the M240B configuration should not be confused with the large numbers of M240/E1 converted to the M240G configuration for the Marine Corps.

The main differences between the M240B and M240G is the Picatinny rail system, hydraulic buffer inside of the butt stock to reduce the amount of recoil felt by the gunner, and the number of gas settings on the gas regulator plug. The M240G has three gas settings, allowing the machine gun to have a fire rate between 650 and 750 rounds per minute when set to the first gas setting, 750–850 rounds per minute at the second gas setting, and 850–950 rounds per minute at the third gas setting, whereas the M240B only has one setting, restricting the fire rate to between 550 and 650 rounds per minute. The smaller gas port used on the M240B slows down the rate of fire, which increases the longevity of the machine gun by reducing stresses on the action. A side effect is a machine gun that will not fire when extremely dirty as the energy on the piston is reduced.

The M240B is being tested with a new adjustable buttstock that may replace the current stock of the M240B. The lighter M240L has started to replace the M240B in U.S. Army service. The Marine Corps is observing the progress of the M240L, but feels it is too expensive for adoption. The Corps is instead looking to upgrade the M240 barrel through several ways, including carbon fiber coatings, new alloys, or ceramic liners, to lighten and strengthen the barrel. The goal would be a barrel that would not need to be changed, would weigh the same, but decrease heat retention, lessen warping, and eliminate cook-offs. They are also interested in incorporating a suppressor into the barrel, rather than having to attach one, to reduce the sound of shots and make it difficult to determine where the gunner is located.

==== M240D ====
The M240D is an upgrade of the M240E1, primarily in the addition of an optical rail on the receiver cover. It has two possible configurations: aircraft and egress (ground). In the aircraft configuration, the M240D has a front and rear sight and a trigger group which accommodates the spade grip device, while the ground configuration involves the installation of an egress package or "infantry modification kit", which is designed to provide downed aircrew personnel with increased firepower. The egress package contains a buttstock assembly, a buffer assembly, a bipod assembly, and a conventional trigger assembly.

The barrel assembly contains a three position gas regulator. The first setting allows the machine gun to cycle at 650–750 rounds per minute, the second gas setting allows the machine gun to cycle at 750–850 rounds per minute, and the third setting allows the machine gun to cycle at 850–950 rounds per minute.

The aircraft configured M240D weighs 25.6 lb (11.6 kg) and is 42.3 in (1,074.42 mm) long, whilst the egress configuration weighs 26.2 lb (11.9 kg) and is 49 in (1244.6 mm) long.

=== M240G ===
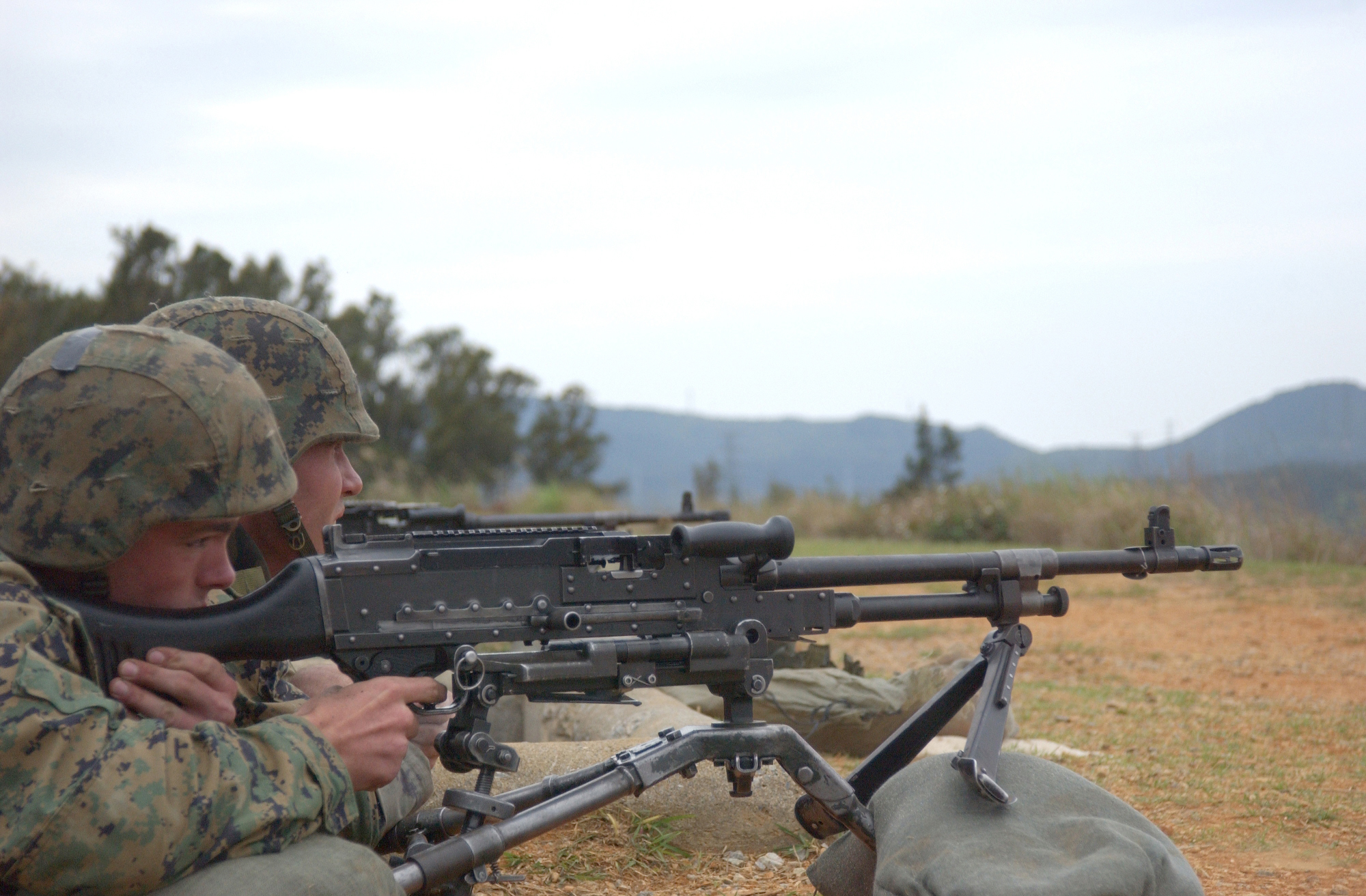
Marines with a tripod-mounted M240G

The M240G allows for commonality throughout the Marine Corps whether the machine gun is used in an infantry, vehicular, or airborne role. The M240G is the ground version of the original M240 or M240E1, 7.62 mm medium class machine gun designed as a coaxial/pintle-mounted machine gun for tanks and LAVs. The M240G can be modified for ground use by the installation of an "infantry modification kit" (a flash suppressor, front sight, carrying handle for the barrel, a buttstock, infantry length pistol grip, bipod, and rear sight assembly). The M240G lacks a front heat guard, and as such is a few pounds lighter than the M240B, weighing in at 25.6 lb (11.6 kg). The rate of fire of the M240G can be controlled by three gas settings. On gas setting one the machine gun will fire at 650–750 rounds per minute, on gas setting two the machine gun will fire at 750–850 rounds per minute, and on gas setting three the machine gun will fire at 850–950 rounds per minute. The size of the gas port increases resulting in greater energy being delivered to the action. Use at high settings induces added stresses on the action and results in a shorter service life of the machine gun. It gives the operator an ability to adjust the gas bleed to the action. This also allows the machine gun to continue firing when very dirty from sustained use in combat conditions when it may be otherwise rendered inoperable due to an extremely dirty and dry action.

==== M240H ====
The M240H, formerly designated as the M240E5 is an improvement of the M240D that features a rail-equipped feed cover, an improved flash suppressor, and has been configured so that it can be more quickly converted to infantry standard using an Egress Kit. The M240H has an overall length of 41.6 in (1056.6 mm) with a 21.7 in (551.2 mm) barrel and weighs 26.3 lb (11.9 kg) empty, and has a cyclic rate of fire of around 550–650 rounds per minute. The M240H entered service in 2004 on U.S. Army helicopters. It is equipped with dual spade grips and thumb-activated trigger systems, and can be quickly converted for dismounted infantry use via an egress components kit that includes a bipod and conventional pistol grip trigger module.

=== M240L ===
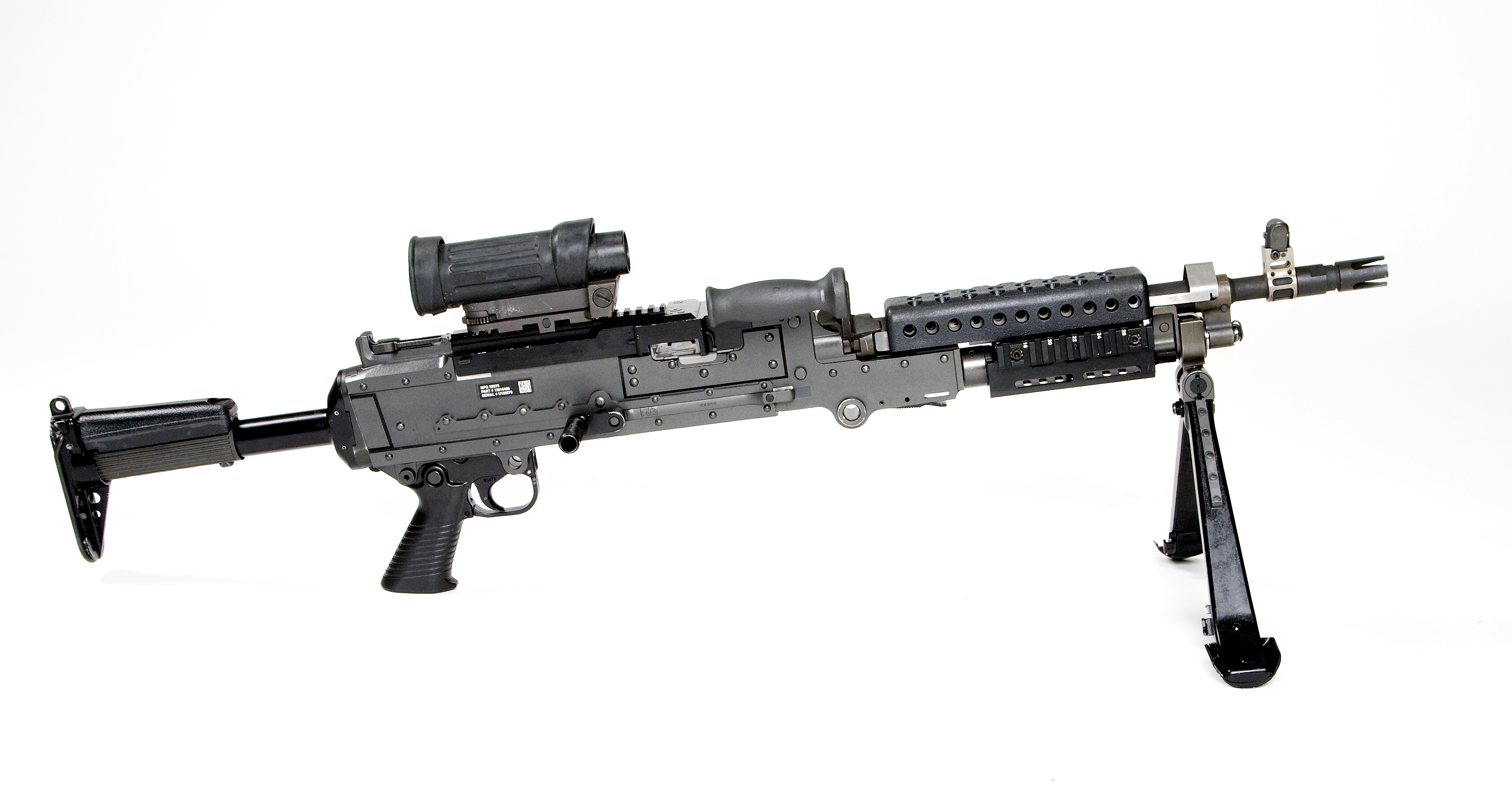
Weight reduced short-barreled M240L, the newest variant in service

The M240L (M240 Lima), formerly designated as the M240E6, is the product of the M240B weight reduction program which reduces the weight of the existing M240B by 5.5 lb (2.5 kg). To achieve 18% weight savings, the M240L incorporates titanium construction and alternative manufacturing methods for fabricating major components. The resulting improvements reduced the soldier's combat load while allowing easier handling and movement of the machine gun. The M240L may replace the M240B in U.S. Army service. It was type classified in the fourth quarter of fiscal year 2010.

Titanium was used to make the receiver body, front sight post, and carrying handle while maintaining steel operating system components. Manufacture had to be adjusted because titanium takes longer to machine than steel and requires more frequent replacement of tooling bits; more pliable stainless steel rivets were used, and the receiver was coated with boron and chrome carbo-nitride coatings with a ceramic-based top coat to preserve it under extreme operating temperatures. The M240L weighs 22.3 lb (10.1 kg) with a standard-length barrel and standard stock, and weighs 21.8 lb (9.9 kg) with a shorter barrel and collapsible stock. The short barrel is 4 in (102 mm) shorter than a standard M240 barrel, and with the collapsible stock the M240L can be made 7 in (178 mm) shorter. The smaller and lighter variant of the M240L is the M240P. The M240P is not used as often as its predecessors. The Army initially bought 4,500 M240Ls, and plans to buy 12,000 total.

==== M240N ====
The M240N is designed with front and rear sights, and configured specifically for mounting on watercraft. It is similar to the M240G, but lacks the integral bipod. It also uses the hydraulic buffer of the M240B, and features the lower cyclic rate of fire of the M240B, which is around 550–650 rounds per minute.

== Derivatives ==
=== Barrett Firearms ===
The Barrett 240 Light Weight Program has its design roots in the original U.S. Army solicitation for a lighter M240 medium machine gun in 2010. The program called for a much lighter version of the M240, while keeping the same open bolt design. This was formally known as the M240B Weight Reduction Program, or the M240E6. The results of that solicitation ended with the adoption of the M240L by the U.S. Army. By producing the receiver out of titanium, instead of steel, FN delivered a light-weight solution by trimming the weight of the M240B by 5.5 pounds, or an 18 percent weight reduction of the original machine gun, giving it an overall weight of 22.3 pounds. The Lima is in limited service with the U.S. Army.

Although Barrett did not participate in the solicitation program, the company felt that it could produce an equivalent weight reduction by more efficient manufacturing methods instead of simply switching to the much more expensive titanium receiver. In addition, the company makes the point that the majority of worldwide titanium reserves are coming from Russia and China. Should relations between the United States and these countries sour, it would become much harder to find sources of titanium. Thus Barrett designed the 240LW and 240LWS, keeping the standard M240 technical data package, while more efficiently manufacturing the receiver.

In 2020, Geissele Automatics announced the acquisition of the technical data packages and intellectual property for the 240LW and 240LWS.

==== Barrett 240LW ====
The Barrett 240LW (Light Weight) is a general-purpose machine gun capable of mounting on a bipod, tripod, aircraft, or vehicle. It is belt fed, air-cooled, gas operated, fully automatic and fires from an open bolt. It features an adjustable buttstock with a hydraulic buffer, feed pawls, a fluted quick detach barrel, a new handguard with Keymod attachments, a new quick detach titanium bipod, adjustable carrying handle, a rivetless receiver, and a three position gas regulator.

==== Barrett 240LWS ====
The Barrett 240LWS (Light Weight Short) gas operated, belt fed, open bolt, medium machine gun is a shortened variant of the 240LW. The design concept of this variant is to produce a viable medium machine gun that would serve in a special operations capacity, where a small team of operators could maximize a medium machine gun by having it in a shorter and lighter package than its big brother, the 240LW, or the equivalent M240B. This follows in the footsteps of the Mk 48 and the M60E6 medium machine guns, also designed for the small unit role. The Mk 48 is a variant of the M249 light machine gun, scaled up to chamber 7.62×51mm NATO; it has come across some issues in its service life; it was never designed to be a general-purpose machine gun, while the M60E6 arguably came too late to make a difference in USMC and US Army general machine gun adoption, being that the M240 design was already well standardized within the Department of Defense ranks. Both offerings are more focused on Special Operations in US Service.

The Barrett 240LWS features a removable and telescoping buttstock that has six adjustable positions. It differs from the buttstock of the 240LW by being half of its size in length, and doesn't have a polymer cheek piece. There are two telescoping rods that allow the buttstock to be extended to the desired position when depressed from the top portion. The rods have indentations on them, which lock into positional latches within the rear of the buttstock. The hydraulic buffer is permanently encased within the stock and is necessary for recoil reduction from the reciprocating movement of the bolt group. Early prototypes had steel QD sling sockets on both sides of the stock; however, current production versions will have solid steel sling loops on either side. This is to alleviate any damage that may occur to a sling that is mounted on the QD socket, and to reduce the amount of stress taken while carrying the machine gun. It also features a Picatinny rail that is longer compared to the Picatinny rail of the M240 machine guns, where the Barrett M107A1 rear sight can be mounted, along with other various optics. The design of the feed tray cover hinge has been altered to be in the shape of a hexagon, thus allowing for the feed tray cover to be able to stay open while at a 45-degree angle to the receiver while the machine gunner is loading a belt of ammunition. The feed tray has also been altered, with two protruding spring-loaded teeth which can bend in the direction of the ammunition belt. These teeth allow the operator to securely place a belt of ammunition on the feed tray while it is at an upright angle, and not have the belt slip out while closing the cover. In addition they allow the operator to be able to squeeze the front of the belt into a closed cover because the teeth only bend in the direction of the belt; the belt will pass over them, then the teeth will click upwards, thus locking the belt in place. Another click forward, and the belt of ammunition will be in place to fire. This allows the operator to feed a belt of ammunition into his 240LWS without ever having to expose his position or line of sight, when opening the feed tray cover.

The position of the pistol grip and firing control group has been redesigned to make the 240LWS even shorter than the 240LW. With this, Barrett moved the entire grip forward by about four inches, to where the front of the trigger guard is at a right angle to the ejection port. By moving the fire control group forward, the overall length could be shortened because the machine gunner no longer needs the traditionally longer stock to compensate for the original position of the pistol group, which is towards the very rear portion of the receiver. Instead of the operator using a cheek weld on the stock, the operator can now rest his face against the actual receiver of the machine gun; it also allows the operator to have a closer fit of the machine gun. But to do this, the bolt had to be modified accordingly, because the sear has been moved from its original location. Barrett had to move the position of the sear catch on the bolt to further down on its length. The bolt group is still the same as the original M240 design, with the exception of the position of the sear catch. Though moving the grip forward took away the ability to connect the LWS to the standard pintle adapter from the M192 lightweight ground mount, Barrett made available as part of the system a new adjustable pintle adapter that works with both that are made by Military Systems Group. As of July 2017, it is not yet clear if that adapter is compatible with the M192 or M122 Traverse and Elevation (T&E) mechanism. However, the primary intended use of the LWS is not to be mounted, but instead to be part of a small team that needs additional firepower while on a foot patrol.

It still features a non-reciprocating bolt handle, a fluted quick detachable barrel and features a quick flip-up sight, a three-position gas regulator similar to the M240G's gas regulator, a standard M240 muzzle compensator, a quick-detach titanium bipod that has three positions, and a new redesigned handguard which no longer touches the gas tube, minimizing heat transfer to the handguard. Unlike the current M240's solution of minimizing the heat transfer, Barrett uses a free floating handguard system, where they bolted the handguard directly to the receiver of the machine gun, instead of to the gas tube assembly. The handguard also has Keymod rail sections at the 3, 6, and 9 o'clock positions, with the side sections being separated from the bottom by a gripping surface for the operator.

=== Ohio Ordnance Works ===
==== OOW240 GPMG ====
The OOW240 GPMG (General Purpose Machine Gun) is similar to the FN M240 but with a select fire trigger group, which is capable of semi-automatic and fully automatic fire. Ohio Ordnance Works also sells the same select fire trigger group separately and is compatible with the FN M240 and other FN MAG variants.

==== OOW240P ====
The OO240P (Patrol) is similar to the GPMG variant but with a shorter barrel. The shorter barrel features dimpling which reduces weight while increasing heat dissipation with no loss of strength or durability. The barrels are available with either single or three position gas regulators and are fully compatible with existing blank fire adaptors.

==== M240-SLR ====
The M240-SLR (Self-Loading Rifle) is a semi-automatic only configuration of the M240, and fires from a closed-bolt.

=== Daycraft Systems ===
The FMG 7.62 is similar to the M240 but with a one-piece instead of riveted steel receiver, which reduces its weight to 17.8lbs (8kg).

== Users ==
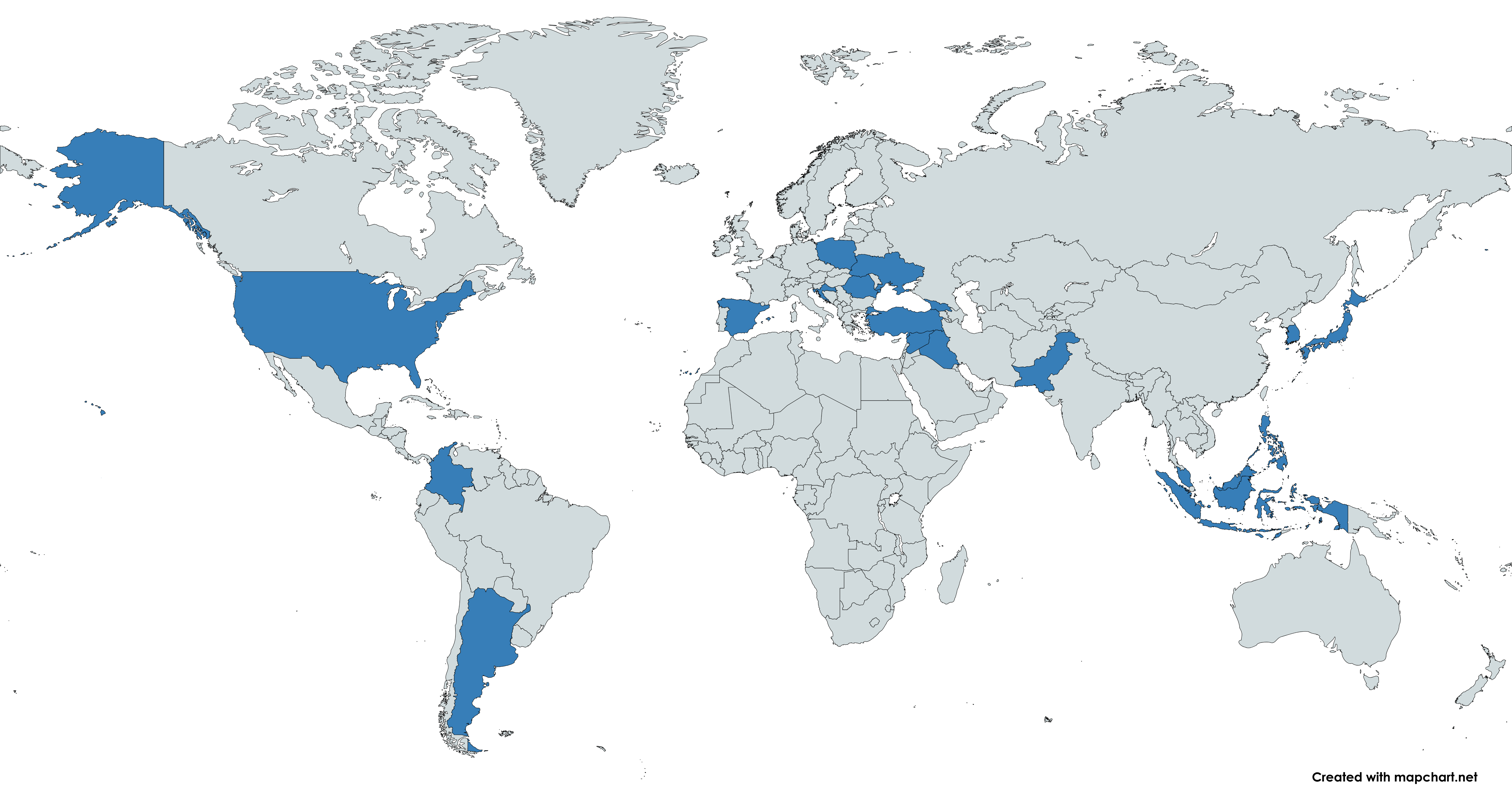
Map with M240 machine gun users in blue.

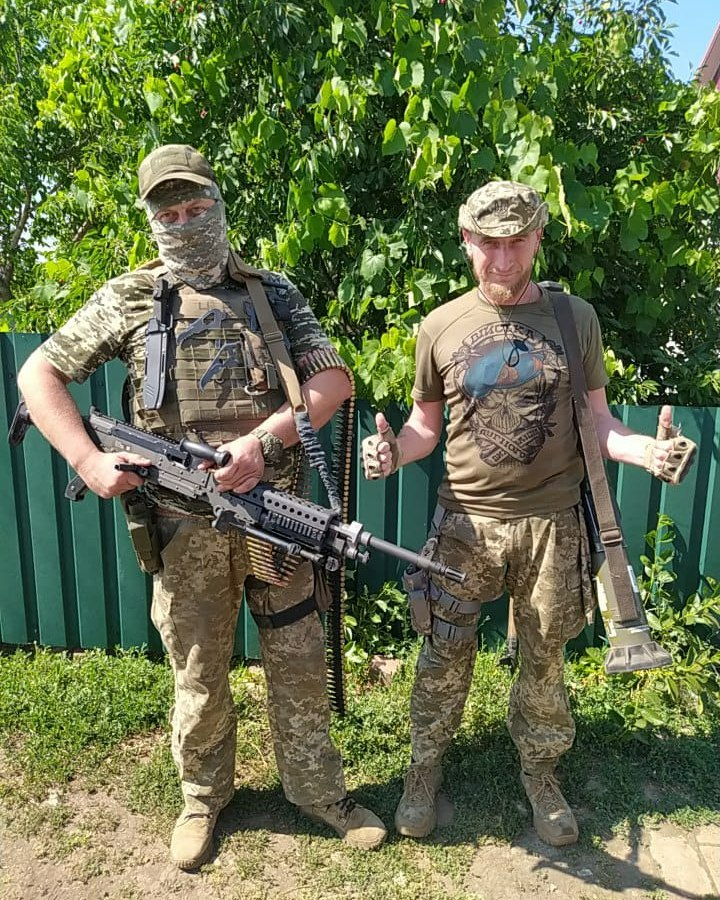
Ukrainian Territorial Defense Forces soldier showing off his M240.

- Argentina
- Colombia
- Croatia: M2 Bradley
- Georgia: Standard issue GPMG.
- Indonesia: M240 (M240C/D) used as coaxial & pintle mounted gun on Leopard 2 Main Battle Tank.
- Iraq
  - Kurdistan
- Japan: M240C coaxial variant mounted on the AAV7 amphibious vehicle used by the JGSDF Amphibious Rapid Deployment Brigade.
- Malaysia: Uses by Royal Malaysia Police.
- Pakistan: Special Service Group.
- Poland: On the M1A2 Abrams Main Battle Tank
- Philippines: Armed Forces of the Philippines - M240B delivered in 2021.
- Romania: M240B used by Special Operations Forces.
- South Korea: M240D machine guns are mounted on the MH-60R helicopters acquired by the Republic of Korea Navy.
- Spain: Used on Chinooks of the Spanish Army Airmobile Force.
- Syria: 2 were captured by the former Syrian Arab Army, but use of the machine gun in the civil war was extremely rare. It is unknown if the modern day Syrian Army still uses them
- Turkey: License built Sarsilmaz SAR 762 MT in use.
- United States:
  - U.S. Army
  - U.S. Marine Corps
  - U.S. Air Force Security Forces
  - Texas Highway Patrol 5 mounted on each Davis-class patrol boat
  - Los Angeles County Sheriff's Department 2 M240B's
  - Long Beach Police Department 2 M240Bs
- Ukraine: Unspecified number received during the Russian invasion in 2022.

=== Non-state users ===
- Free Syrian Army: Used in their technicals.

=== Former users ===
- Syria – The Syrian Arab Army captured two in 2020.

== See also ==
- Third Arm Weapon Interface System

== Bibliography ==
- McNab, Chris (2018). The FN MAG Machine Gun: M240, L7, and other variants. Weapon 63. Osprey Publishing. ISBN 9781472819673.
- Neville, Leigh (2018). Technicals: Non-Standard Tactical Vehicles from the Great Toyota War to Modern Special Forces. New Vanguard 257. Oxford, UK: Osprey Publishing. ISBN 978-1472822512.
