= TALOS (uniform) =

Conceptual robotic exoskeleton

TALOS (Tactical Assault Light Operator Suit) was a research and development effort by United States Special Operations Command (SOCOM) to create a powered exoskeleton for its operators. First proposed in 2013, the goal was to design a suit with the help of universities, laboratories, and the technology industry. The brief for TALOS stated that it had to be bulletproof, weaponized, have the ability to monitor vitals, and give the wearer enhanced strength and perception. The suit was envisioned to comprise layers of smart material and sensors. It was intended not for an entire squad, but to protect a lead operator who would breach a door first, the most vulnerable team member in that situation.

The TALOS effort, often described as a "effort" rather than a formal program, officially concluded in 2019 after determining that the original "supersuit" concept was not feasible with current or near-term technology. However, the project is now viewed by SOCOM as a technology demonstrator that successfully accelerated the development of numerous advanced components which have been transitioned to other military programs.

== History ==
The TALOS concept was first presented by Admiral William McRaven, then-commanding officer of the United States Special Operations Command, at a conference in May 2013. He said that the protective suit was inspired by the loss of one of his troops in Afghanistan.

United States Special Operations Command expected "1st gen capability" inside a year, though development took longer than anticipated. The project was a collaborative effort between 56 corporations, 16 government agencies, 13 universities, and 10 national laboratories. They worked together to incorporate features including a powered exoskeleton, full-body armor, and situational-awareness displays. Admiral McRaven expressed hope that a system could be fielded by August 2018.

In response to 2018 reports that United States Special Operations Command missed the initial deadline, command leadership stated they were confident about testing a powered exoskeleton by summer 2019. Partners involved in the project included Defense Advanced Research Projects Agency, U.S. Army Research, Development and Engineering Command, and the Army Research Laboratory.

=== Conclusion and Legacy ===
In February 2019, SOCOM officially announced that the TALOS "supersuit" concept as originally envisaged was not feasible. A spokesman for the command stated that the fully integrated suit was "not the right approach" and that the final prototype, while demonstrating some capabilities, "was not suitable for operations in a close-combat environment" due to weight and power consumption issues. The Joint Acquisition Task Force (JATF) TALOS was subsequently disbanded.

Rather than resulting in failure, the project was reframed as a successful innovation hub. Its primary legacy is the advancement and "spin-off" of individual subsystems that could be integrated into existing gear incrementally. The lessons learned also informed a new SOCOM focus on the "Hyper-Enabled Operator" (HEO), a concept that prioritizes information dominance through advanced sensors, data processing, and networking, rather than purely physical augmentation.

== Component Development and Spinoffs ==
Although the objective of the program was to incorporate new technologies into a fully powered and integrated suit, its most significant contribution was accelerating the development of components that could be issued individually to troops to enhance their effectiveness. Non-lethal weapons, new armor materials, more compact communications gear, advanced night vision, and 3-D audio were matured as individual pieces of equipment.

Items developed or matured under TALOS that have been transitioned to other programs or for operational use include:

- An increased tactical data storage capability.
- A new lightweight, polyethylene-based armor solution used for special operations non-standard commercial vehicles.
- A small, individual soldier SATCOM antenna.
- An unpowered, load-bearing exoskeleton to improve weight distribution.
- A powered cooling vest to sustain body temperature.
- A next-generation antenna with dynamic tuning.
- Lightweight multi-hit ceramic-metallic hybrid armor.
- A biosensor-equipped combat shirt that can monitor a soldier's physiological status.
- A "third arm" weapon stabilization device to improve accuracy.

== Challenges ==
- Power Source: A significant hurdle was the power demand, which required a large and heavy power source, conflicting with the goal of a practical combat suit. The project aimed for the suit to weigh less than 400 lb (180 kg) and generate 12 kW of power for 12 hours, a goal that proved unattainable.
- Integration and Funding: Defense industry leaders expressed skepticism about SOCOM's financial outlook and development schedule. Science and technology officials believed that the core technologies would not be achievable before 2026. Integrating components from dozens of different companies into a single, functional suit was a massive systems engineering challenge. The allocated funding, around $80 million over the project's life, was considered low for a project of such ambition, especially compared to previous efforts like the Land Warrior program.

== Examples of Prototypes ==
At the 2015 Special Operations Forces Industry Conference, Revision Military displayed its prototype Kinetic Operations Suit on a full-sized mannequin. Launched a year prior, the suit featured a powered, lower-body exoskeleton to transfer the weight down to the waist belt and supported it with motorized actuators on each leg. The exoskeleton supported a body armor system capable of stopping rifle rounds that surrounded 60 percent of the operator, compared to 18 percent with then-current armor vests. The suit included a small power pack and a cooling vest to maintain the operator's core temperature. The Kinetic Operations Suit underwent live-fire testing and combat scenarios, demonstrating that an operator could perform tasks in similar times to a currently-outfitted operator.

== See also ==
- Powered exoskeleton
- Future Soldier
- Iron Man's Armor
- Halo (series)
- Crysis
- Talos (Greek Mythology)
