= Hardiman =

Powered exoskeleton

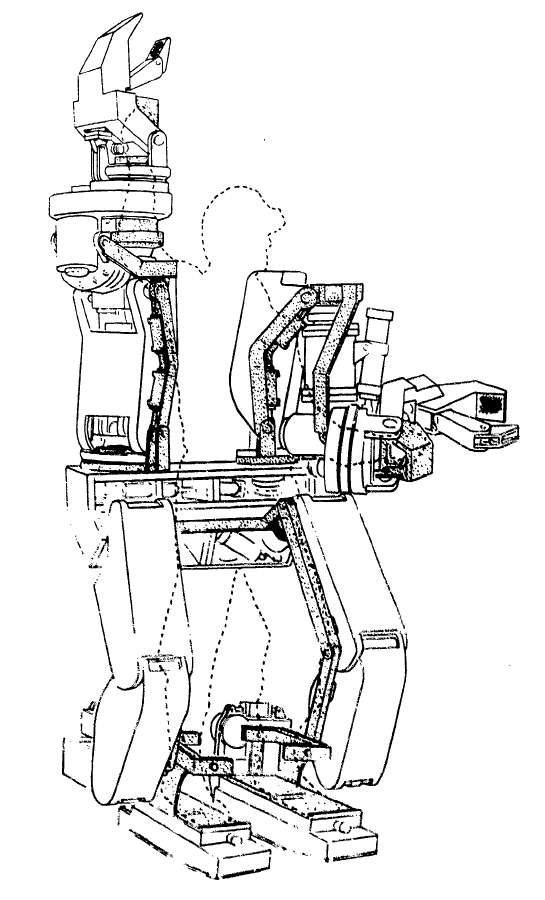
- Hardiman I prototype
- Creator: General Electric
- Country: United States
- Year: 1965

Hardiman was the first attempt to build a practical powered exoskeleton, by General Electric between 1965 and 1971. The machine was intended to allow the wearer to lift loads of 750 pounds (340 kg) with ease. The project was led by the engineer Ralph Mosher, who had previously worked on the Handyman.

The project was not successful overall. Any attempt to use the full exoskeleton resulted in a violent uncontrolled motion, and as a result, the exoskeleton was never turned on with a person inside. Mosher wrote of these difficulties in designing a powerful machine functioning as an extension of the human body, noting that a machine lacking the ability to receive and interpret force feedback would be very likely to cause the machine to destroy whatever object it was interacting with in performing the task at hand. According to General Electric's Hardiman Project Report from 1969, "When turned on power to operate the shoulder joint, the arm lurched and the elbow would not operate." Further research concentrated on one arm. Although it could lift its specified load of 750 pounds (340 kg), it weighed three quarters of a ton (1500 pounds or 680kg) , just over twice the liftable load. Without getting all the components to work together the practical uses for the Hardiman project were limited.
