= ExoRehabilitation =

Combination of rehabilitation methods

ExoRehabilitation is a combination of physical exercise with exoskeletons with other rehabilitation methods, such as physiotherapy, which leads to the improvement of health in general, and the ability to walk, in particular. It is not only a restorative process, but also social and emotional integration of people with locomotor disorders. At the core of ExoRehabilitation lies combined application of medical exoskeleton with other methods, such as exercise therapy or physiotherapy.

ExoRehabilitation increases muscle strength and stamina, improves stability and functional balance, reduces spasticity, normalizes blood pressure, aids digestion and urination. The patients' psychological state goes through notably positive changes: thanks to the social aspect of rehabilitation the level of depression is reduced, they feel more self-assured about the future and realize that they are not limited by their condition.

== Stages of ExoRehabilitation ==
ExoRehabilitation begins in a hospital at the first stage of rehabilitation, after the patient's condition has stabilized; at the second and third stages the procedure changes: sessions are conducted on an outpatient basis several times a week at medical facilities or social protection agencies. The patients who are unable to visit a hospital may choose to train at home under supervision of a mobile team.

Every time a foot hits the ground, it sends signals to the brain. The exoskeleton helps to follow the natural gait and therefore stimulates the restoration of sensitivity and independent walking. The quality of life and the will to live increase dramatically. A patient wants to become healthy and be more integrated into society.

The aim of gait restoration is to enable the person to walk again - even if he has to use compensatory strategies. Gait rehabilitation focuses on recovery of gait - the aim is that the patient "relearns" to walk - if possible without help. Mobility independence is a key to general health restoration of people with disabilities.
