= Third Arm Weapon Interface System =

Firearm stabilizing device

The Third Arm Weapon Interface System (TAWIS), or Third Arm, is a passive, stabilizing device developed by the US Army Research Laboratory (ARL) in 2016 to redistribute the weight of heavy firearms to make them easier to hold and carry. It weighs less than 1.8 kg (4 pounds) and consists of a mechanical appendage made out of carbon fiber composite that has one end attached to a carbon fiber plate that fits inside an armor plate pocket and the other end attached to a Picatinny rail on top of the gun. It was designed to permit more accurate use of heavier weapons and reduce fatigue by displacing the weight of the weapon from the arms to the torso and to mitigate weapon recoil. As of 2018, the Third Arm is a prototype that is still in the testing phase of its development.

== History ==
The development of the Third Arm began in 2015 as a collaborative effort in ARL's Human Research and Engineering Directorate (HRED) and Weapons & Research Materials Directorate (WMRD). The project aimed to improve soldiers' marksmanship by finding ways to make the use of heavier, more lethal firearms and larger bullets easier to manage.

The first prototype of was built in 2016 and first unveiled to the public in March 2017 at the Association of the United States Army (AUSA) conference in Huntsville, Alabama. A pilot study was conducted in summer 2017, where the prototype was tested with six soldiers who wore electromyography sensors that recorded muscle activity with and without the third arm. The results indicated that the device improved shooting accuracy and lessened muscle fatigue. A second prototype was constructed based on the soldiers’ feedback. Changes included the mounting location, the addition of an extendable hinge plate that adhered to different body types, and refinements to the design that made it easier for the wearer to dive into the prone shooting position.

== Applications ==
The Third Arm can be used to completely take off the weight of heavy firearms such as the 7.5 kg (17-pound) M249 light machine gun or the 12.5 kg (27.6-pound) M240B general-purpose machine gun from the holder's arms. By supporting the weapon's weight, soldiers are capable of operating the firearm with one hand, leaving the other hand free for another task. It can be used to carry a breaching saw or a shield instead of a firearm. Testing has shown that the Third Arm provides immediate stabilization during movement, allowing for improved marksmanship.

== See also ==
- Aliens (film)
- Affusto d'assalto/bari mount
- Steadicam, similar concept
- Sling (firearms)
- Walking fire
- Weapon mount
