= Picatinny rail =

Rail interface for firearm accessories

The Picatinny rail (MIL-STD-1913 rail or 1913 rail) is an American rail integration system designed by Richard Swan that provides a mounting platform for firearm accessories. It forms part of the NATO standard STANAG 2324 rail. It was originally used for mounting of telescopic sights atop the receivers of larger caliber rifles.

Once established as United States Military Standard, its use expanded to also attaching other accessories, such as: iron sights, tactical lights, laser sights, night-vision devices, reflex sights, holographic sights, foregrips, bipods, slings and bayonets.

An updated version of the rail is adopted as a NATO standard as the STANAG 4694 NATO Accessory Rail.

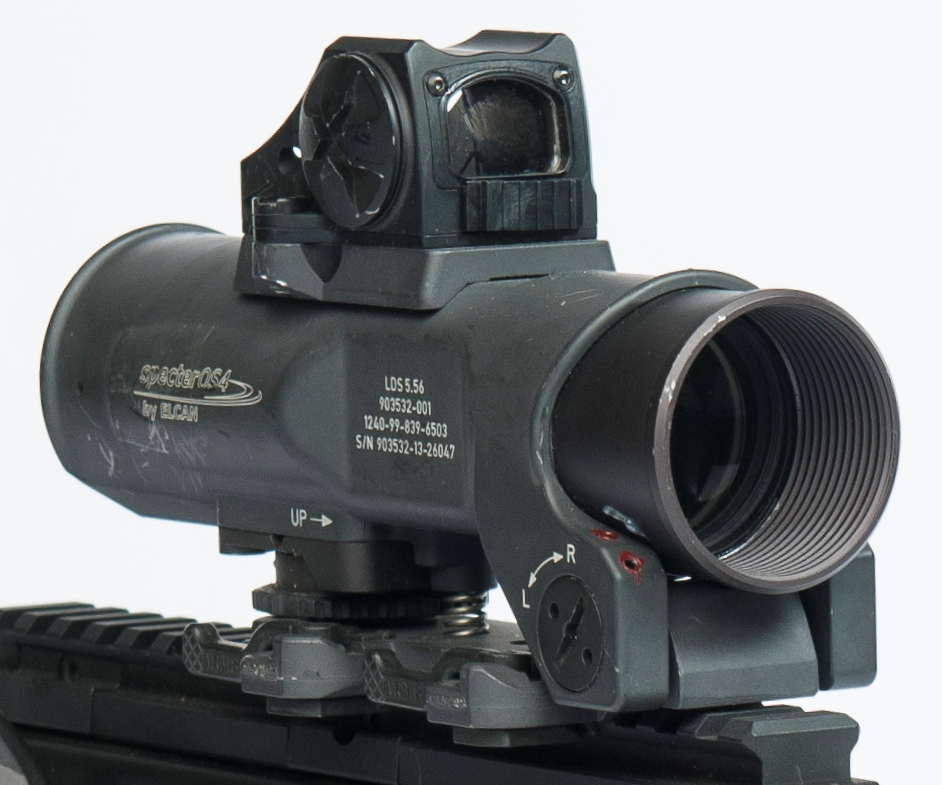
Close-up of a 4x scope mounted on a Picatinny Rail.

== History ==
MIL-STD-1913 rail dimensions, cross section (dimensions in inches)

Attempts to standardize the Weaver rail mount designs date from work by the A.R.M.S. company and Richard Swan in the early 1980s. Specifications for the M16A2E4 rifle and the M4E1 carbine received type classification generic in December 1994. These were the M16A2 and the M4 modified with new upper receivers where rails replaced hand guards.

The MIL-STD-1913 rail is commonly called the "Picatinny Rail", in reference to the Picatinny Arsenal in New Jersey. Picatinny Arsenal works as a contracting office for small arms design (they contracted engineers to work on the M4).

Picatinny Arsenal requested Swan's help in developing the rail, but did not draft blueprints or request paperwork for a patent. That credit goes to Richard Swanson of A.R.M.S., who conducted research and development and acquired a patent for the rail in 1995. Swan has litigated in civil court against Colt and Troy industries regarding patent infringement. The courts found that Troy had developed rifles with rail mounting systems nearly identical to the MIL-STD-1913 rail.

A metric-upgraded version of the MIL-STD-1913 rail, the STANAG 4694 NATO Accessory Rail, was designed in conjunction with weapon manufacturers like Aimpoint, Beretta, Colt, FN Herstal and Heckler & Koch, and was approved by the NATO Army Armaments Group (NAAG), Land Capability Group 1 Dismounted Soldier (LCG1-DS) on May 8, 2009.

Many firearm manufacturers include a MIL-STD-1913 rail system from the factory, such as the Ruger Mini-14 Ranch Rifle.

== Design and construction ==
The rail consists of a strip undercut to form a "flattened T" with a hexagonal top cross-section, with cross slots interspersed with flats that allow accessories to be slid into place from the end of the rail and then locked in place. It is similar in concept to the earlier commercial Weaver rail mount used to mount telescopic sights, but is taller and has wider slots at regular intervals along the entire length.

The MIL-STD-1913 locking slot width is 0.206 in (5.23 mm). The spacing of slot centers is 0.394 in (10.01 mm) and the slot depth is 0.118 in (3.00 mm).

Picatinny rails are typically made from aluminum, steel, or a combination of both.

- Aluminum rails are lighter and less expensive than steel, but they may not be suitable for heavy use.
- Steel rails are more durable than aluminum, but they are also heavier and are more expensive.
- Rails are also constructed from polymer material, but they are not as common as aluminum or steel.

== Comparison to Weaver rail ==
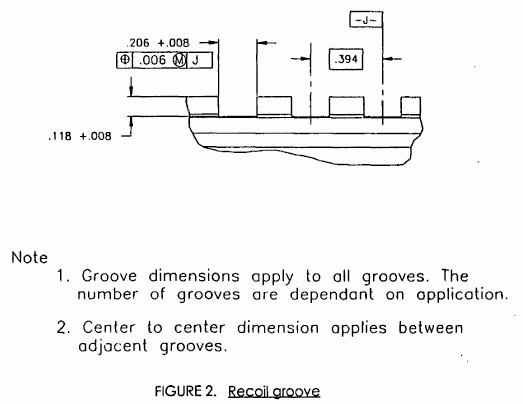
MIL-STD-1913 rail side view, illustrating recoil grooves (dimensions in inches)

The only significant difference between the MIL-STD-1913 rail and the similar Weaver rail mount are the size and shapes of the slots. Whereas the earlier Weaver rail is modified from a low, wide dovetail rail and has rounded slots, the MIL-STD-1913 rail has a more pronounced angular section and square-bottomed slots. This means that an accessory designed for a Weaver rail will fit onto a MIL-STD-1913 rail whereas the opposite might not be possible, unless the slots in the Weaver rail are modified to have square bottoms.

While some accessories are designed to fit on both Weaver and MIL-STD-1913 rails, most MIL-STD-1913 compatible devices will not fit on Weaver rails. From May 2012, most mounting rails are cut to MIL-STD-1913 standards. Many accessories can be secured to a rail with a single spring-loaded retaining pin.

Designed to mount heavy sights of various kinds, a great variety of accessories and attachments are now available and the rails are no longer confined to the rear upper surface (receiver) of long arms but are either fitted to or machine milled into the upper, side or lower surfaces of crossbows, pistols, long arms, and anti-materiel rifles.

== Impact ==
Because of their many uses, MIL-STD-1913 rails and accessories have replaced iron sights in the design of many firearms and are available as aftermarket add-on parts for most actions that do not have them integrated, and they are also on the undersides of semi-automatic pistol frames and grips.

Their usefulness has led to them being used in paintball, gel blasters, airsoft and foam dart blasters.

== See also ==
- Firearm modification
- Third Arm Weapon Interface System
- Warsaw Pact rail
- Zeiss rail
