= M63 ground mount =

Firearm component used by the United States Marine Corps

The M63 ground mount is a four-legged anti-aircraft weapon mount used on the M2HB Browning machine gun.

The tripod itself weighs 65 kg (144 lb) and has a height of 106.7 cm (42 in) with M2. It has a maximum elevation of 85°, depression of 29° and traverse of 360°.

The mount could be used against both ground and aerial targets and users included the British Army. It was produced by Manroy engineering.

The mount is usually sandbagged in a hole with each leg staked down. Use against ground targets is better suited to the M3 tripod because the mount tends to be unstable when the gun is fired at low angles.

== See also ==
- M205 tripod
- M3 tripod
- M2 tripod
- M122 tripod
- M192 Lightweight Ground Mount
