= FN MAG =

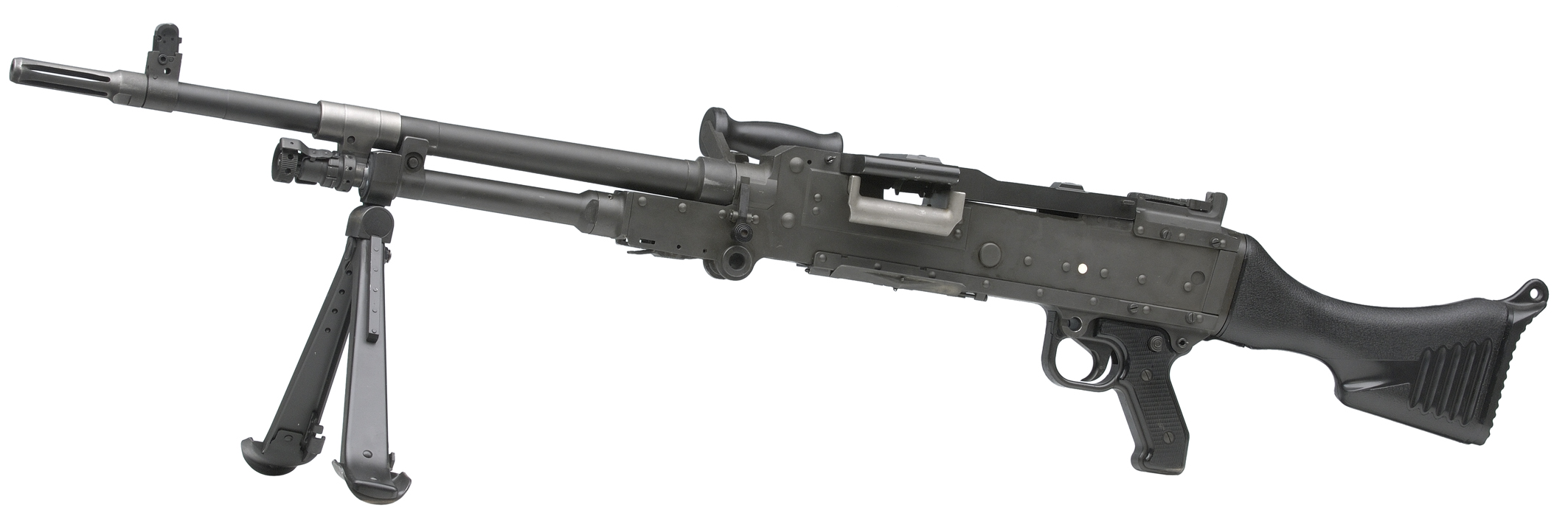
- An FN MAG with modern polymer furniture
- Type: General-purpose machine gun
- Place of origin: Belgium

Service history
- In service: 1958–present
- Used by: See Users
- Wars: Congo Crisis; Indonesia–Malaysia Confrontation; Rhodesian Bush War; South African Border War; Six-Day War; Nigerian Civil War; Vietnam War; War of Attrition; Yom Kippur War; The Troubles; Falklands War; Lebanese Civil War; Salvadoran Civil War; Sri Lankan Civil War; Liberian Civil Wars; Gulf War; Sierra Leone Civil War; Burundian Civil War; War in Afghanistan (2001–2021); Iraq War; Cambodian–Thai border dispute; Kivu conflict; Libyan Civil War; Syrian civil war; Spillover in Lebanon; Russo-Ukrainian War

Production history
- Designer: Dieudonné Saive, Ernest Vervier
- Designed: 1950
- Manufacturer: FN Herstal; Colt Canada; Fabricaciones Militares; Heckler & Koch; U.S. Ordnance; Ordnance Factory Board; Royal Small Arms Factory; Barrett Firearms Manufacturing
- Produced: 1958–present
- No. built: 200,000+
- Variants: See Variants

Specifications
- Mass: 11.8 kg (26.01 lb)
- Length: 1,263 mm (49.7 in)
- Barrel length: 630 mm (24.8 in)
- Width: 118.7 mm (4.7 in)
- Height: 263 mm (10.4 in)
- Cartridge: 7.62×51mm NATO
- Action: Gas-operated long-stroke piston, open bolt
- Rate of fire: 650–1,000 rounds/min
- Muzzle velocity: 840 m/s (2,756 ft/s)
- Effective firing range: 800 m (875 yd) (bipod); 1,800 m (1,969 yd) (tripod)
- Maximum firing range: 3,500 m (3,828 yd)
- Feed system: Non-disintegrating DM1 or disintegrating M13 linked belt
- Sights: Folding leaf sight with aperture and notch, front blade

The FN MAG (French: Mitrailleuse d'Appui Général, English: General Purpose Machine Gun, lit. 'Machine gun for general support') is a Belgian 7.62 mm general-purpose machine gun, designed in the early 1950s at Fabrique Nationale (FN) by Ernest Vervier. It has been used by more than 80 countries and it has been made under licence in several countries, including Argentina, Canada, Egypt, India, and the United Kingdom.

The MAG is available in three primary versions: the standard, infantry Model 60-20 machine gun, the Model 60-40 coaxial machine gun for armoured fighting vehicles, and the Model 60-30 aircraft variant.

== History ==
After World War II the Swedish Army, who used two 6.5×55mm versions of the Browning Automatic Rifle (BAR) since the 1920s, wanted to replace them with a belt-fed version. FFV-Carl Gustaf tried to design a derivative, but their belt feeding mechanism (placed below the action, like on the BAR) did not pass military trials. Therefore FN Herstal was approached, and Belgian designers came up with the idea to flip the BAR action upside down and mate it with the proven MG 42 belt-feeding mechanism. The work was started in the late 1940s by Dieudonné Saive and finished by Ernest Vervier in 1953, with Swedish trials beginning in 1955.

The MAG served as a complement to the FN FAL battle rifle. It first entered production in 1958 (Ksp 58 chambered in 6.5×55mm), and it is sometimes referred to as the MAG-58.

== Design details ==
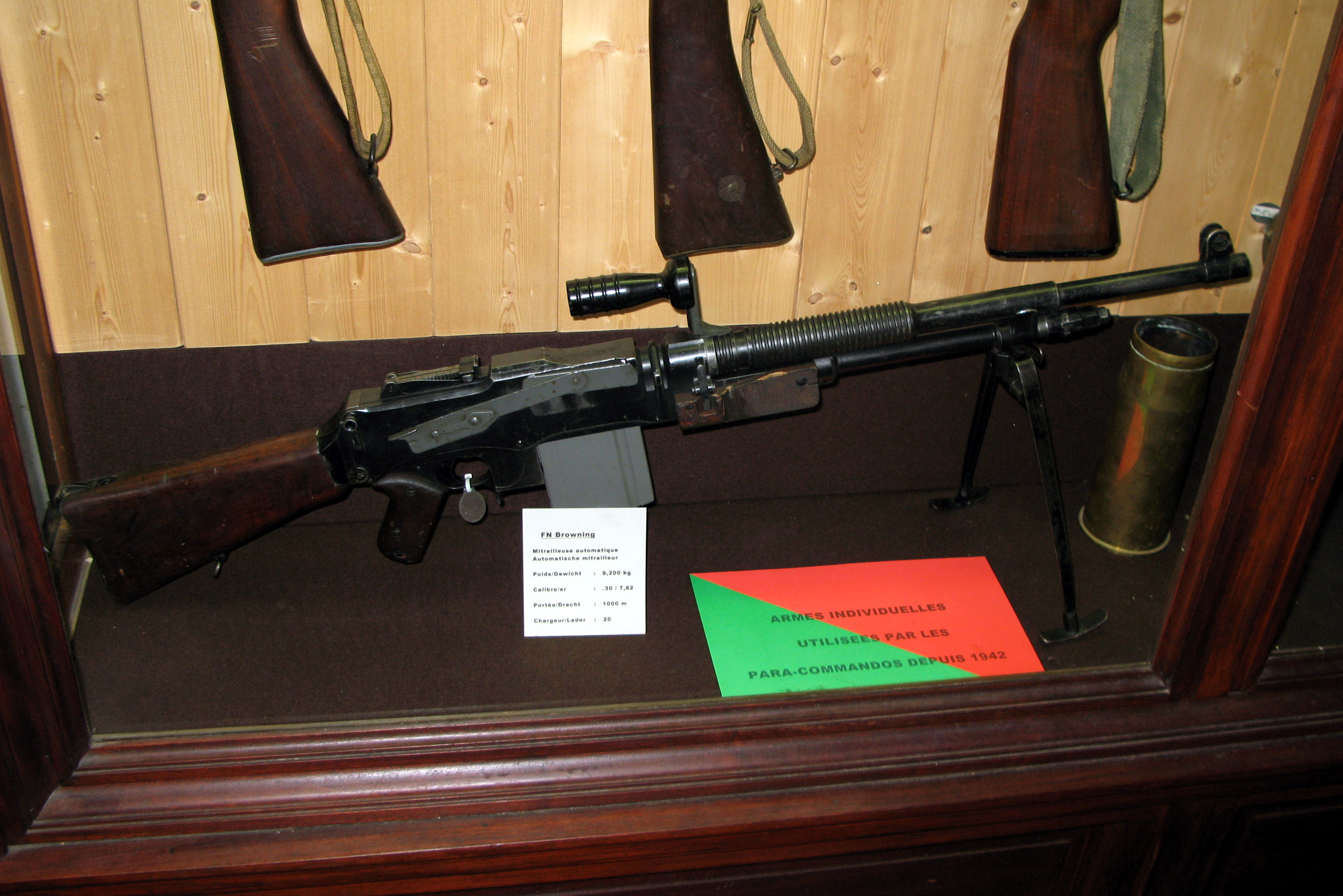
FN Mle D variant of the Browning M1918 (BAR)

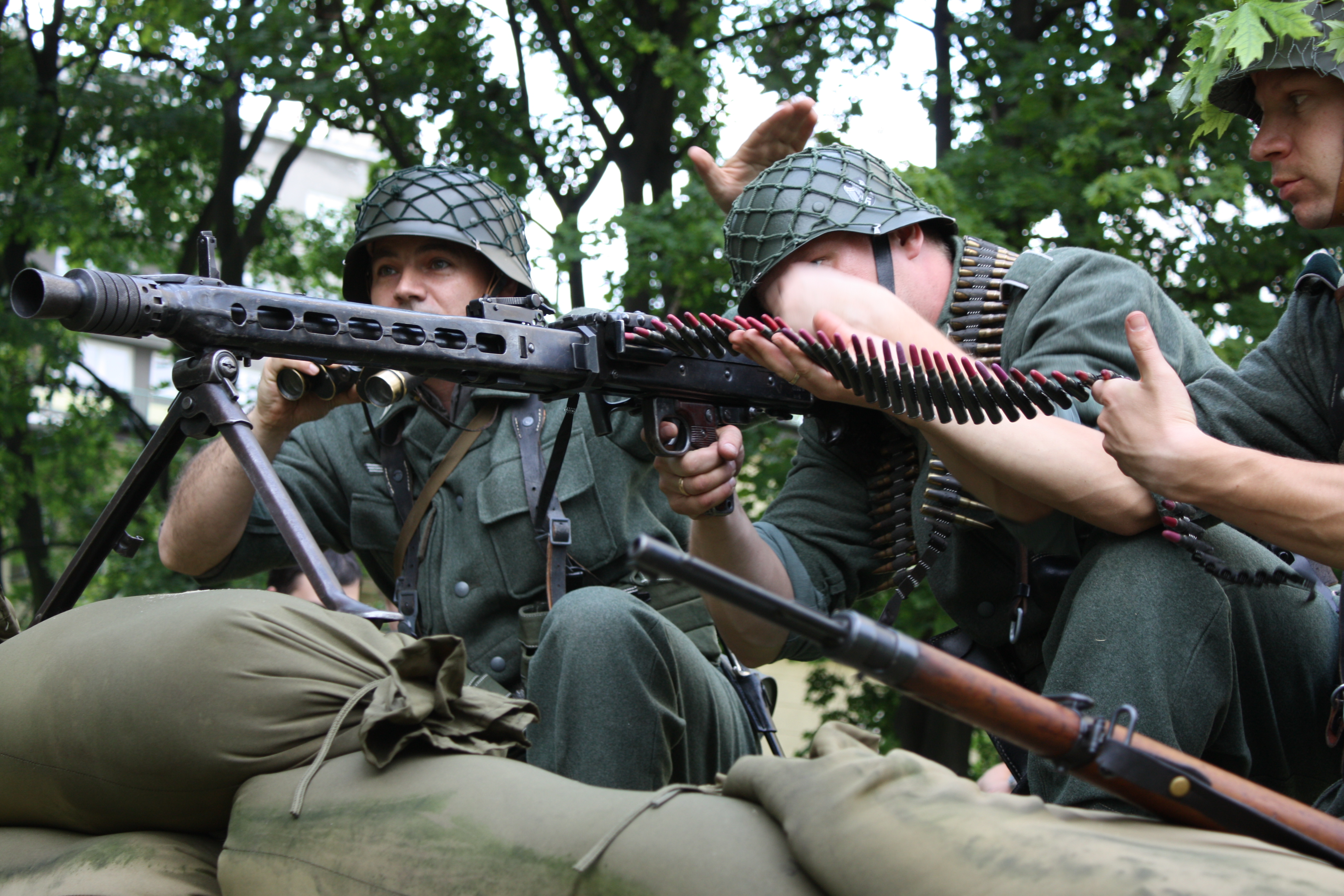
Wehrmacht reenactors with a belt-fed MG 42

The FN MAG is modeled on the Browning M1918 (BAR) and MG 42

The MAG Model 60-20 is an automatic, air-cooled, gas-operated machine gun, firing belt-fed 7.62×51mm NATO from an open bolt. The MAG uses a series of proven design concepts from other successful firearms, for example the locking mechanism is modeled on that of the Browning M1918 (BAR) automatic rifle, which FN produced under license with some adaptions, and the feed and trigger mechanisms are from the WW II-era MG 42 universal machine gun.

=== Operating mechanism ===
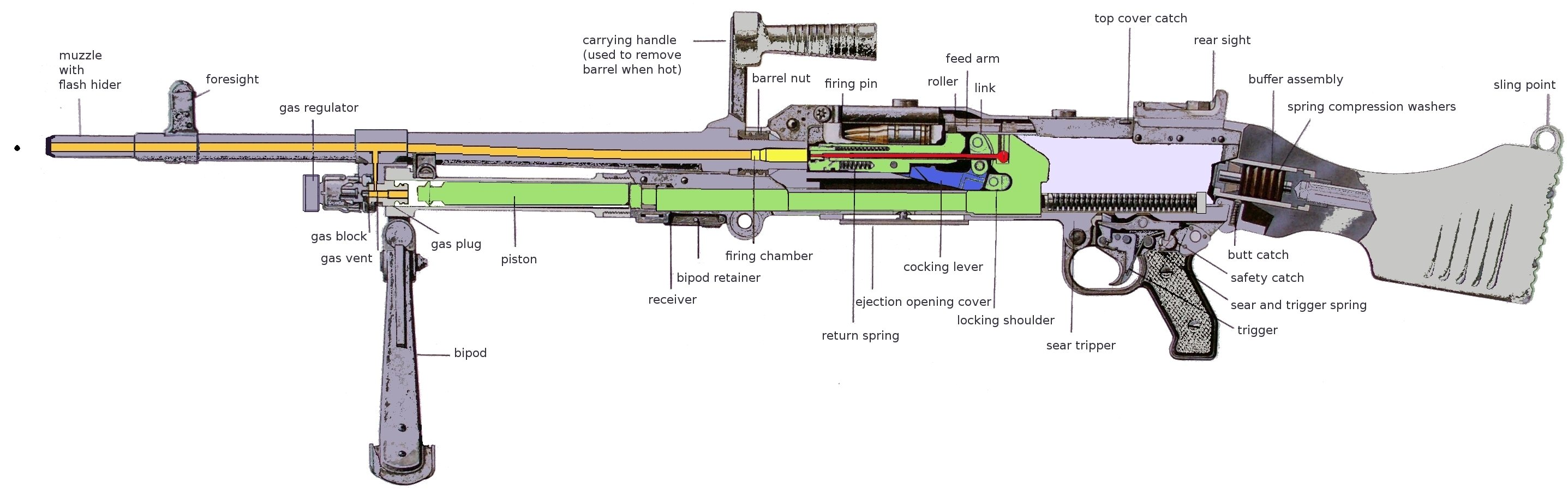
A schematic showing the mechanism of the FN MAG.

The MAG operates via a long-stroke piston system, which utilizes the ignited powder gases generated by firing vented through a port in the barrel to propel a gas piston rod connected to the locking assembly. The barrel breech is locked with a vertically tilting, downward locking lever mechanism that is connected to the bolt carrier through an articulated joint.

The locking shoulder and camming surfaces that guide the locking lever are located at the base of the receiver. The unlocking sequence starts after 15 mm (0.6 in) rearward gas piston rod movement to keep the breech block fully locked until the bullet has left the gun barrel and the high-pressure propellant gas pressure has dropped to a safe level.

The MAG fires from an open bolt. Both the spring-powered extractor and ejector are contained in the bolt. After firing, spent cartridge casings are removed downwards through an ejection port normally covered by a spring-loaded dust cover at the bottom of the receiver. The machine gun has a striker firing mechanism (the bolt carrier acts as the striker as it contains a channel that houses the firing pin, which protrudes out from the surface of the bolt upon firing), an automatic-only trigger assembly and a manual cross-bolt push-button safety, which is located above the pistol grip.

=== Features ===
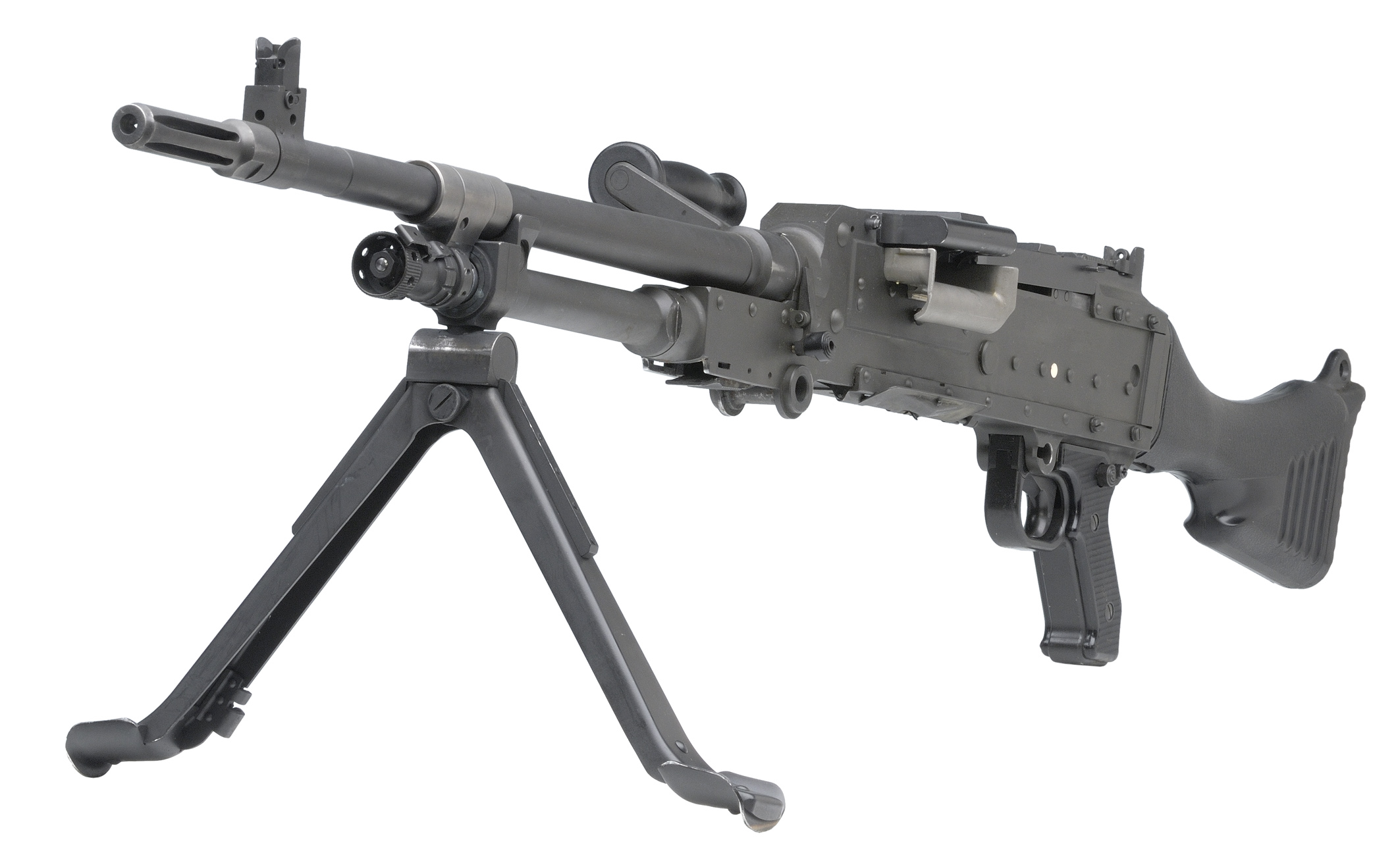
Muzzle end of the MAG with rotary gas selector switch

The MAG's receiver is constructed from sheet metal stampings reinforced by steel plates and rivets. The front is reinforced to accept the barrel nut and gas cylinder which are permanently mounted. Guide rails that support the bolt assembly and piston extension during their reciprocating movement are riveted to the side plates. The bolt's guide rails are shaped downward to drive the locking lever into engagement with the locking shoulder, which is also riveted to the side plates. The rear of the receiver has been reinforced and slotted to accept the butt stock. The MAG is also equipped with a fixed wooden stock (later production models feature polymer furniture), pistol grip, and carrying handle.

A user-adjustable gas valve allows regulating the cyclic rate of fire from 650 up to 1,000 rounds per minute, and subsidiary can adjust the gas system for various types of cartridge loadings or use in the presence of heavy fouling. A high cyclic rate of fire is advantageous for use against targets that are exposed to a general-purpose machine gun for a limited time span, like aircraft or targets that minimize their exposure time by quickly moving from cover to cover. For targets that can be fired on by a general-purpose machine gun for longer periods than just a few seconds, the cyclic firing rate becomes less important.

=== Barrel ===
The quick-change barrel has a slotted flash suppressor. The barrel's chamber and bore are chrome-lined or stellite-lined for increased service life and the barrel has four right-hand grooves with a 305 mm (1:12 in) rifling twist rate. Also attached to the barrel is the front sight base, carry handle and gas block (equipped with an exhaust-type gas regulator valve with three settings). The barrel assembly weighs 3,050 g (6.72 lb) and of the 630 mm (24.80 in) long barrel a portion of 487.5 mm (19.19 in) is rifled. The MAG takes zero shifts between barrel assemblies into account by making the front sight of the assemblies adjustable with the help of tools.

=== Feeding ===
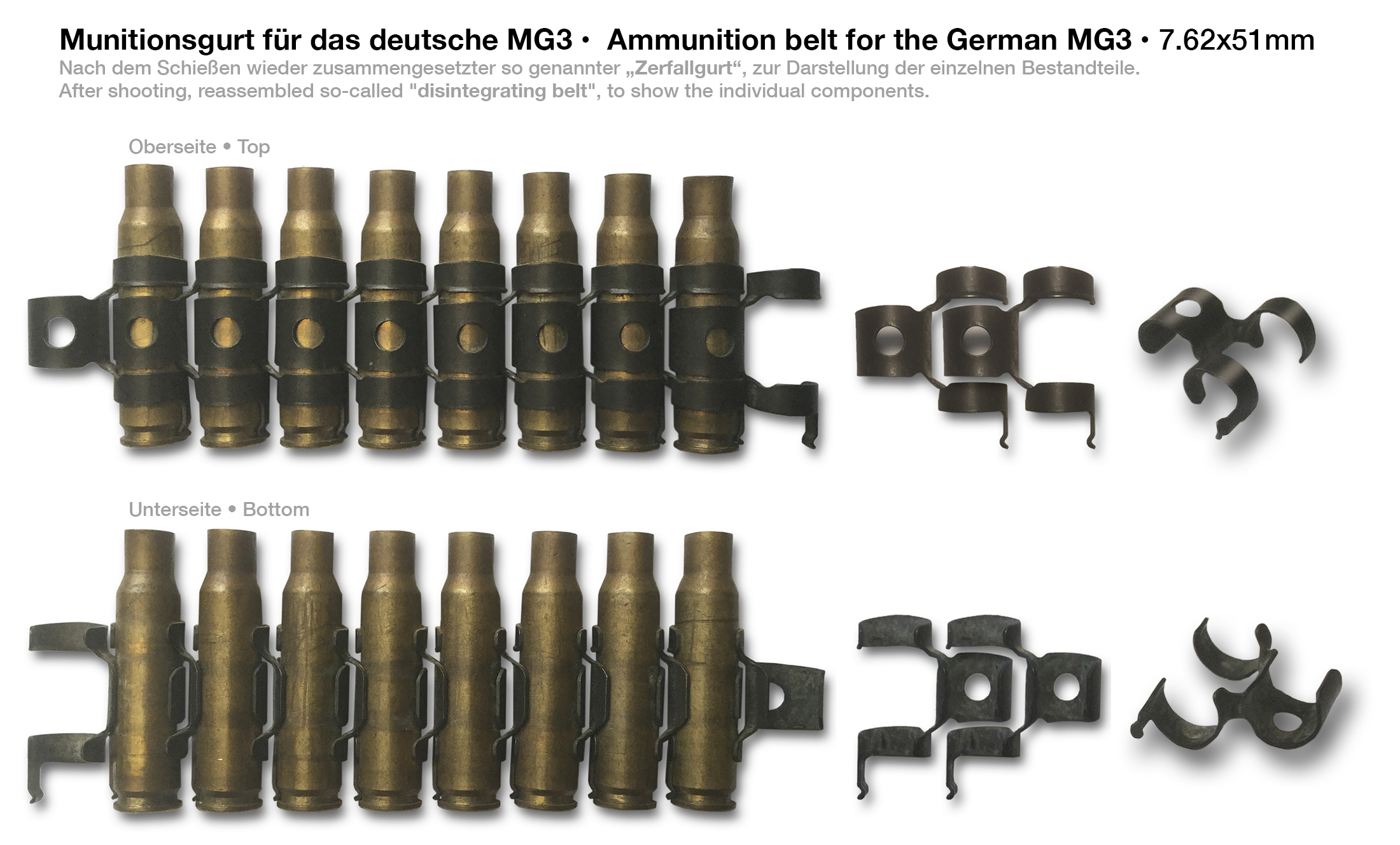
M13 links reassembled to previously fired 7.62×51mm NATO cartridge cases

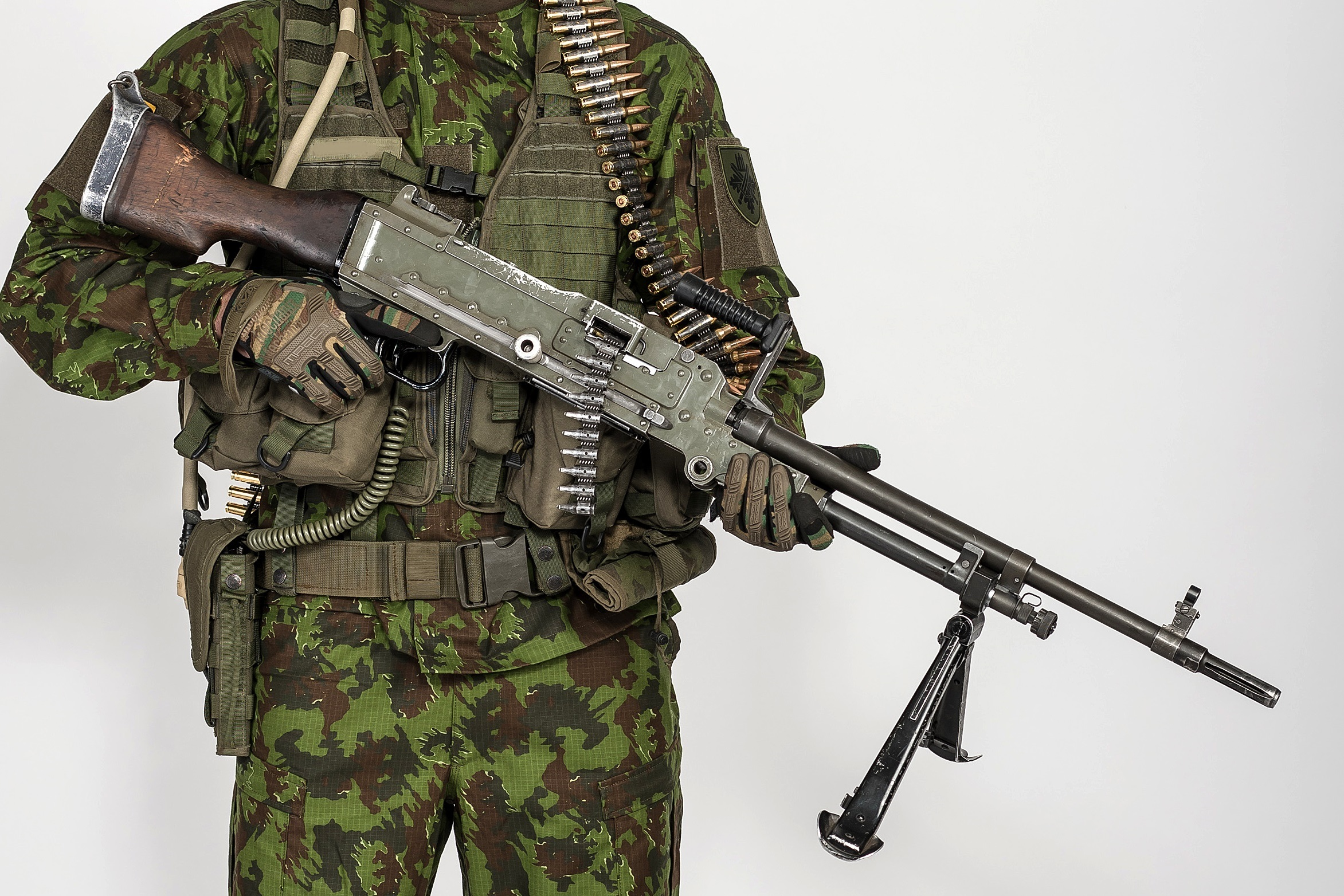
Ksp58B loaded with a non-disintegrating DM1 7.62mm ammunition belt in Lithuanian service

The weapon feeds from the left side from open-link, metal ammunition belts: either the American disintegrating M13 linked belt (NATO standard) or the non-disintegrating segmented German DM1 belt, whose 50-round sections can be linked through a cartridge. The DM1 belt is based on the last version of the Gurt 34/41-family used in World War II in MG 34 and MG 42 machine guns. After firing, the separated M13 link or emptied DM1 belt section is cleared out on the right side of the receiver through an ejection port normally covered by a spring-loaded dust cover.

In order to adapt the weapon to feed from one belt type to the other, several components of the feed mechanism need to be reconfigured since the position of the feed tray's cartridge stop and pawl angles in the top cover are different. The MAG features a pawl-type feeding mechanism that continues to move the feed link during both the rearward and forward cycles of the reciprocating bolt carrier, producing a smooth belt flow.

The feeding mechanism's three pawls are actuated by a roller connected to the bolt carrier. The feed channel rail, feed link, both feed slides and the feed tray are chrome plated. The top cover body is an anodized aluminum casting. In the infantry assault role, the weapon can be fitted with a sheet metal container that houses a 50-round belt and is attached to the left side of the receiver.

=== Sights ===
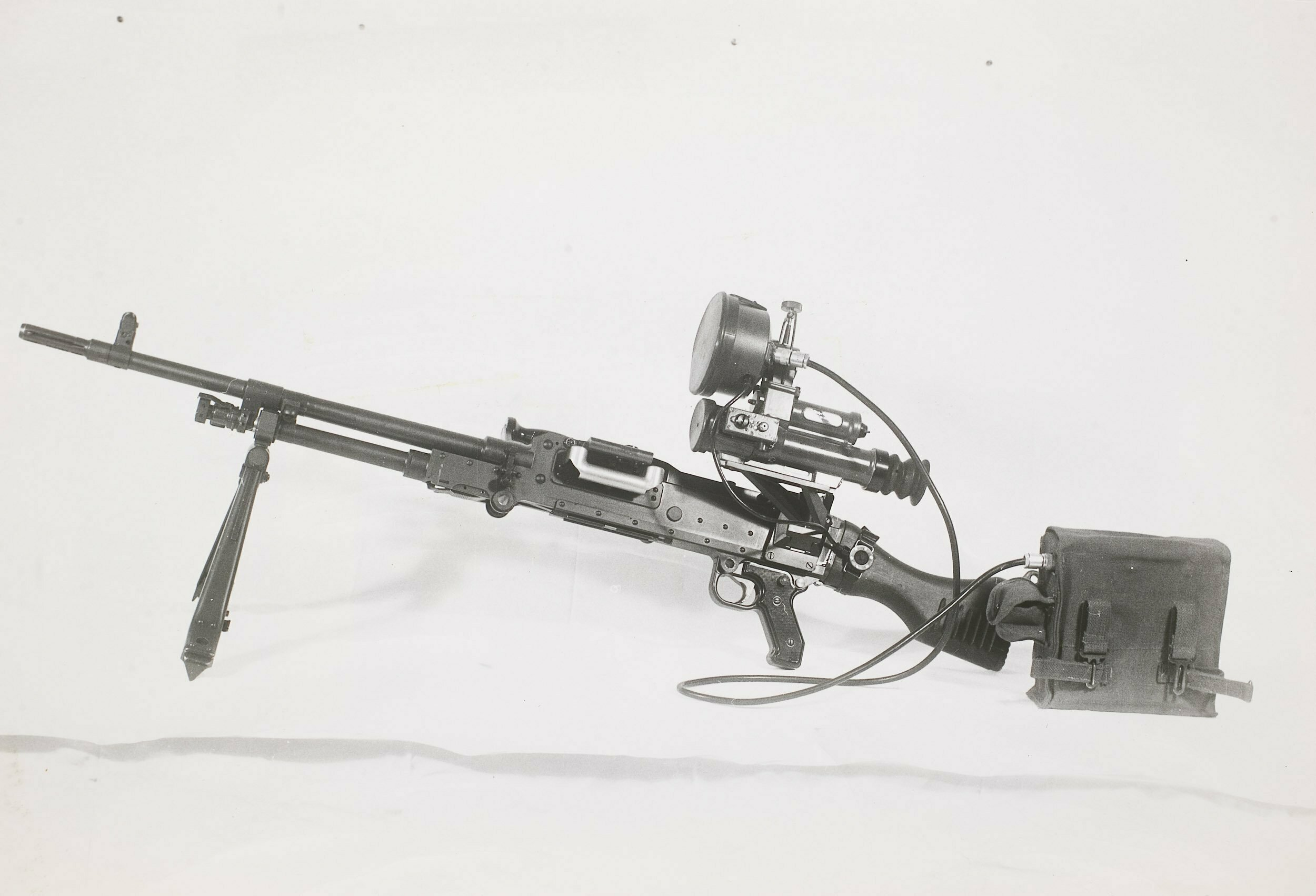
An early infrared emitter and detector configured on the MAG for use in low visibility conditions.

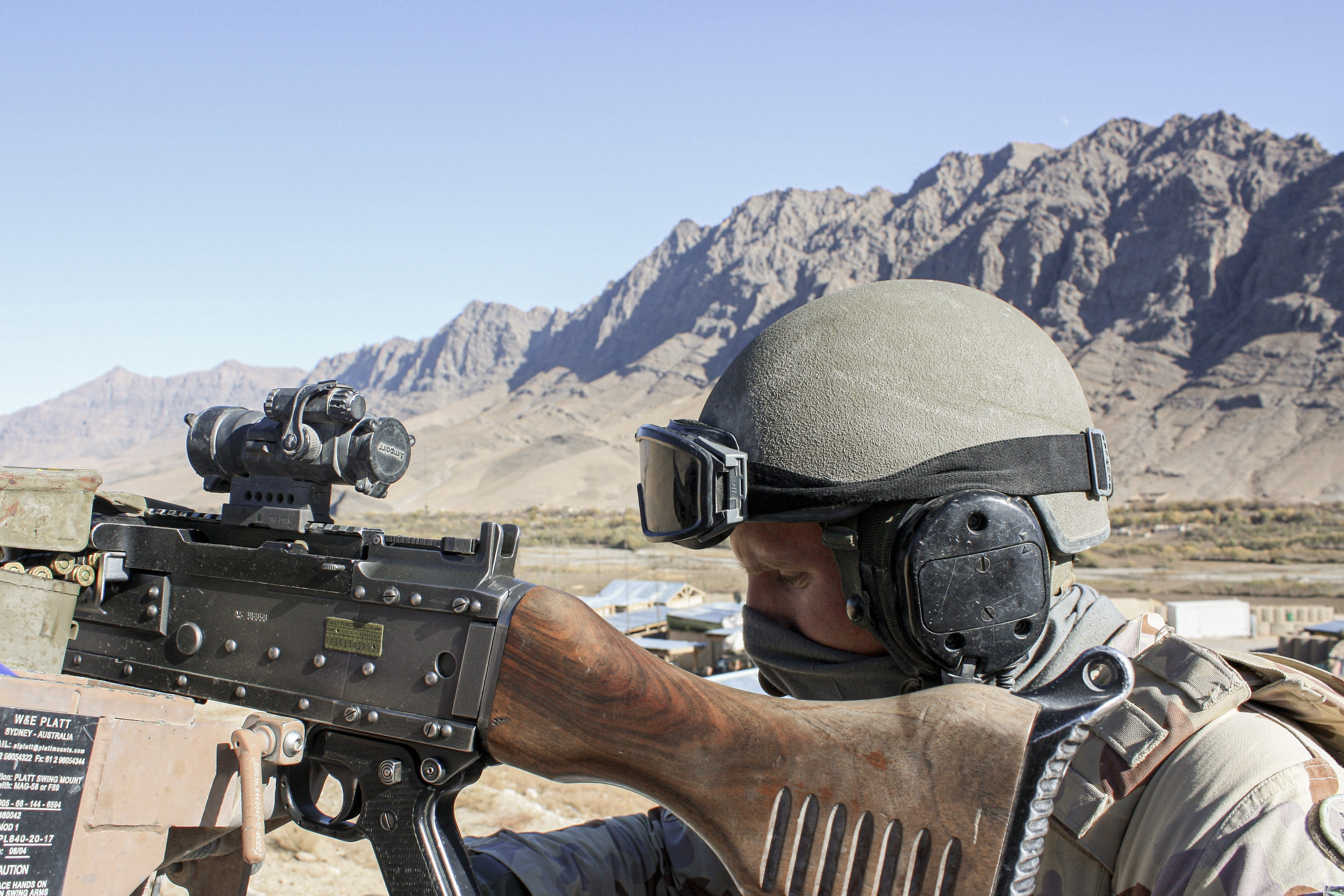
MIL-STD-1913 rail used to mount an optical sight atop the receiver

The MAG is equipped with iron sights that consist of a forward blade (adjustable mechanically for both windage and elevation) and a folding leaf rear sight with an aperture in the down position for firing distances from 200 to 800 m (219 to 875 yd) in 100 m (109 yd) increments and an open U-notch for ranges from 800 to 1,800 m (875 to 1,969 yd) graduated every 100 m (109 yd). The rear sight is hinged to a base with protective ears that is integral with the receiver's upper forging. The iron sight line has a 848 mm (33.4 in) sight radius.

The top of later production model receivers often feature a MIL-STD-1913 rail as a mounting platform for firearm accessories like (low light) optical sights and night-vision devices.

=== Safety ===
With the safety placed in the safe setting, the sear mechanism is disabled. The safety can only be engaged with the weapon cocked.

=== Bipod and tripod ===
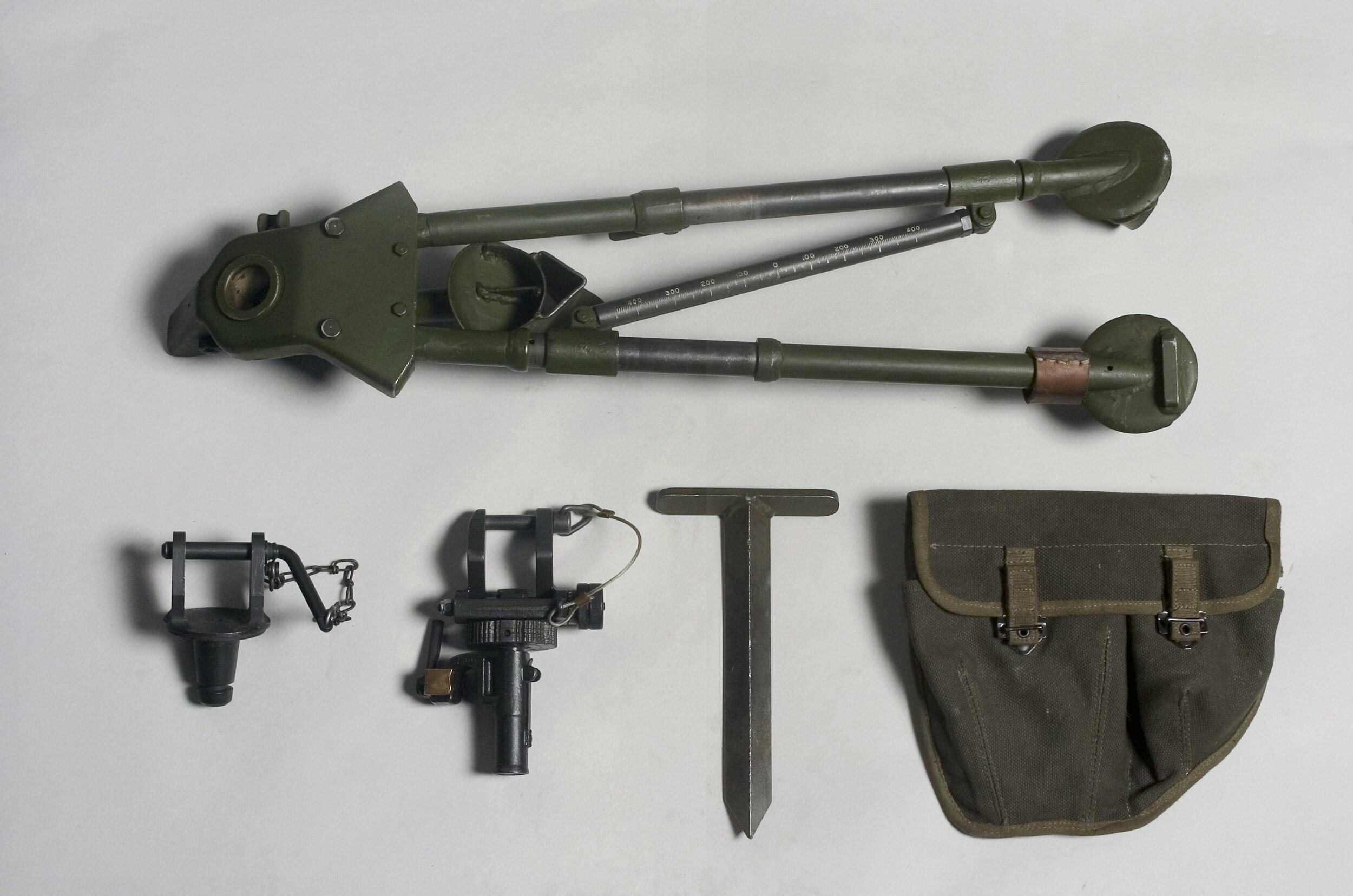
The MAG tripod and cover as issued by the Royal Netherlands Army

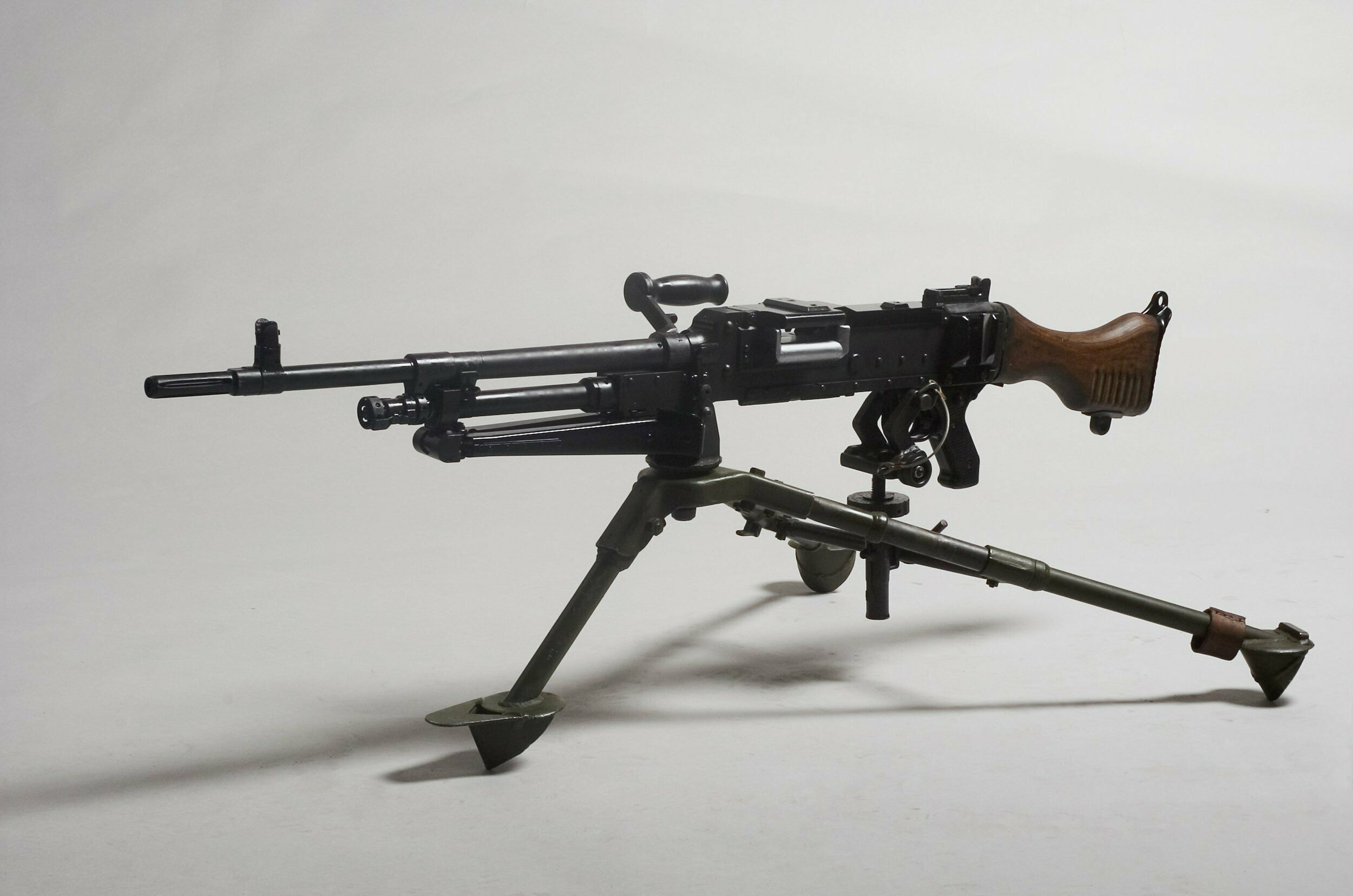
MAG on tripod

For the light machine gun fire support role, the gun is fitted with a folding bipod (attached to the end of the gas cylinder) that can be adjusted for height. For carrying or use as a forearm, the aluminum legs can be folded back and secured in slots under the receiver by hooks and a spring-loaded catch. When firing from the hip, the bipod legs remain extended and the left leg is gripped for support. The bipod can be removed from the gas cylinder by tapping-out a roll pin in the gas cylinder head until it is flush and the bipod can be rotated enough to clear the gas cylinder's retaining lugs.

In the static medium machine gun sustained fire support role, the weapon is mounted on a tripod that offers a higher degree of accuracy and control than the bipod, for example the FN 360° tripod, which features an elevation adjustment mechanism that enables the weapon's bore axis to be maintained from 300 mm (11.8 in) to 600 mm (23.6 in), has a 30° to +15° elevation change and a 360° traverse range.

== Variants ==
Variants of the FN MAG were manufactured by at least ten companies: FN Herstal, Fabricaciones Militares, Changfeng Machinery, Indian Ordnance Factories, Carl Gustaf Stads Gevärfaktori, the Ordnance Development and Engineering Company of Singapore, Canadian Arsenals Limited, the Royal Small Arms Factory, Heckler and Koch, U.S. Ordnance, Barrett Firearms Manufacturing, Manroy Engineering, Yunnan Xiyi Industry Company Limited, and Egypt's Maadi Company for Engineering Industries.

=== FN production variants ===
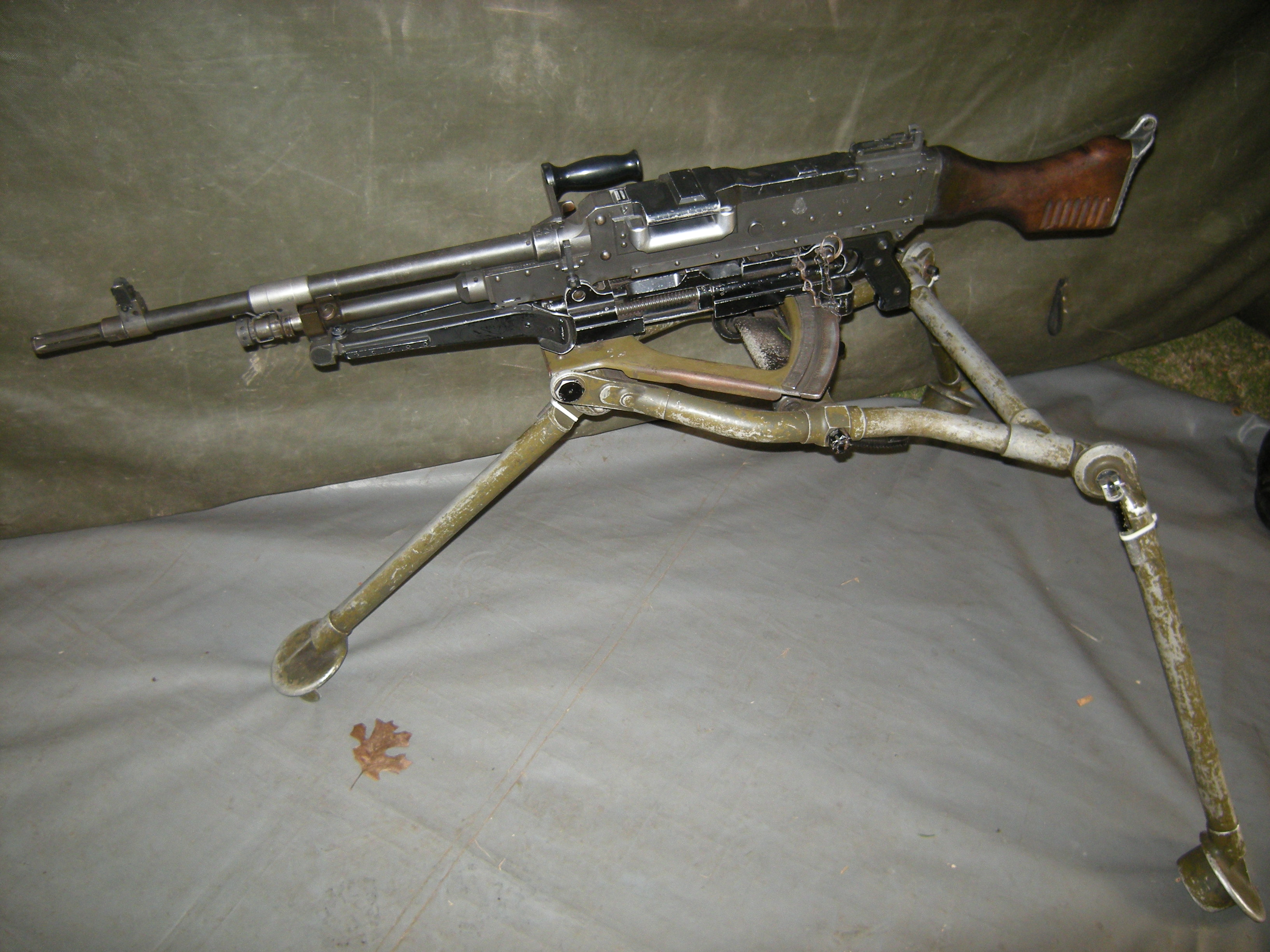
7.62 Ametralladora Tipo 60-20 MAG, Argentine version of the FN MAG used by the Argentine Army.

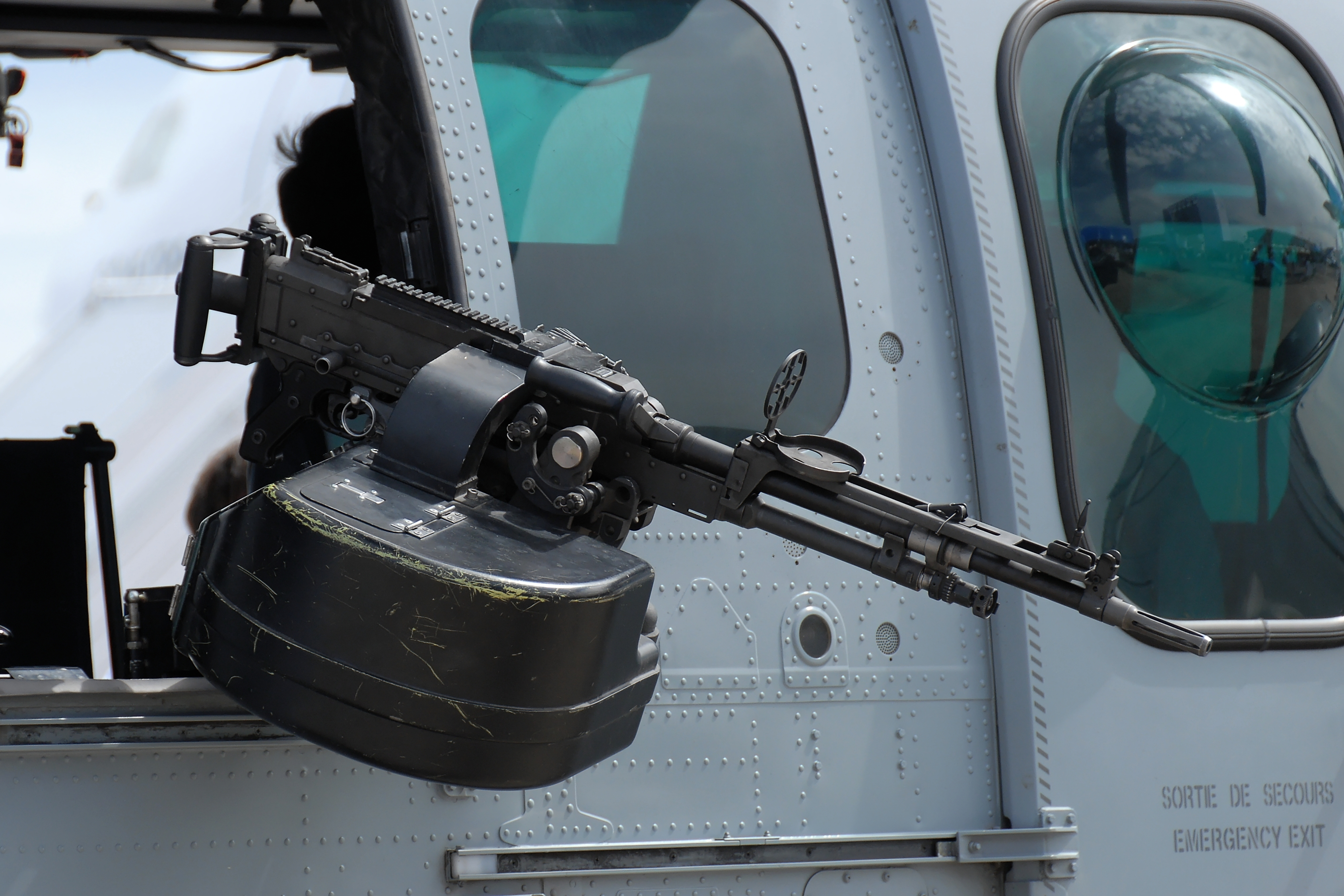
An FN MAG mounted on a Eurocopter EC725 Caracal at the 2007 Paris Air Show held at Le Bourget airport.

Designation	Description
MAG 60.20	Standard infantry version with pistol grip, fixed buttstock and bipod; Many subvariants including the T3 (L7A1) and T6 (L7A2)
MAG 60.30	Fixed aircraft version, firing from a solenoid trigger; Capable, at least in some subvariants, of left and right hand feeding
MAG 60.40	Coaxial version for armoured fighting vehicles; Many subvariants including the T3 (M240)
MAG 10.10	Jungle version with shorter barrel and buttstock.

The vehicle-mounted variant of the MAG lacks a stock, bipod, carry handle, pistol grip, ejection port dust cover and a mount for optical sights. It does, however, have a new closed-type gas regulator. Depending on the weapon's employment, the machine gun can also be fitted with an extended charging handle linkage, standard trigger group (with a pistol grip), or a specialized trigger assembly with an electrically fired trigger.

The pintle-mounted aircraft model is fed from either the right- or left-hand side exclusively with the M13 belt. Thus configured, weapons typically lack standard iron sights and are equipped with electrically powered triggers.

==== TACTICAL ====
A modernisation unveiled in 2026 sold either integrated with new-build weapon orders or as a Long Rail Conversion Kit that allows unit armourers to convert existing in-service weapons in minutes using basic tools.

It features a long monolithic top rail, side-click & auto-lock feed cover, articulated carrying handle and adjustable tactical buttstock.

=== British versions ===
Designation	Description
L7A1	7.62×51mm NATO FN MAG 60.20 T3 machine gun.
L7A2	L7A1 variant; FN MAG 60.20 T6; Improved feed mechanism, hammer forged barrels, and provision for 50 round belt-box.
L7A2 Mid-Life Improvement	2007 iteration of the L7A2 "incorporating a number of safety-critical modifications".
L8A1	L7A1 variant; For mounting inside AFVs. No buttstock. Barrel fitted with fume extractor. Solenoid-triggered, but with folding pistol grip for emergency use.
L8A2	L8A1 variant; improved feed mechanism.
L19A1	L7A1 variant; extra-heavy barrel (8 lb (3.6 kg)). Not routinely issued (if at all).
L20A1	L7A1 variant; for remote firing in gun pods and external mountings.
L20A2	L20A1 variant; improved feed mechanism.
L37A1	L8A1 variant; L8A1 breech & L7 barrel for mounting on AFVs. Conventional pistol grip and trigger, plus kit allowing dismounted use.
L37A2	L37A1 variant; L8A2 based. As above.
L43A1	L7A1 variant; for use as a ranging gun on the Scorpion light tank
L44A1	L20A1 variant; for Royal Navy
L112A1	L7A2 variant; for mounting on Lynx Helicopter

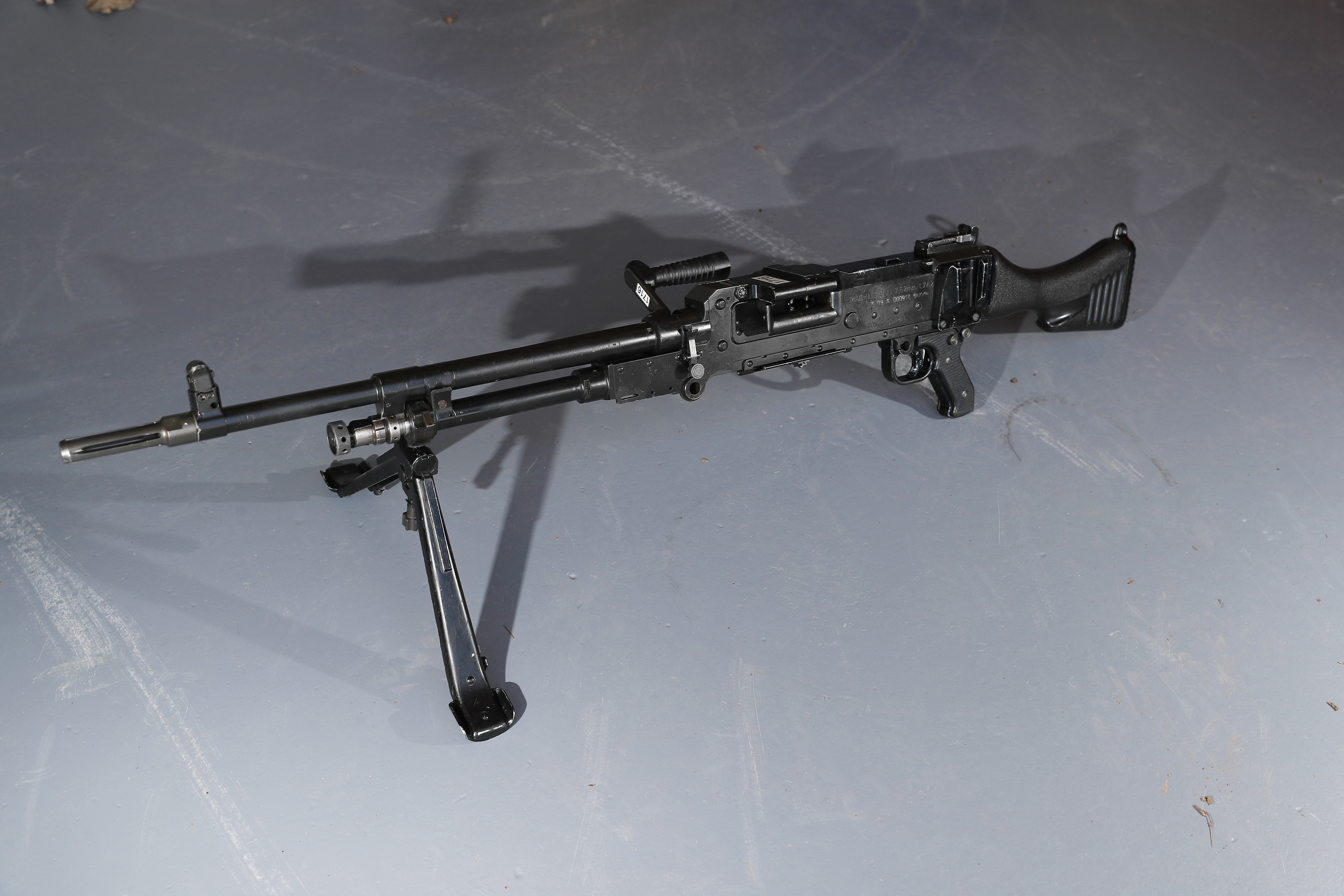
L7A2 GPMG in its light role configuration (which is also the typical configuration used for vehicle pintle mounts); the sight bracket on the left side of the receiver distinguishes it from the stock FN MAG.

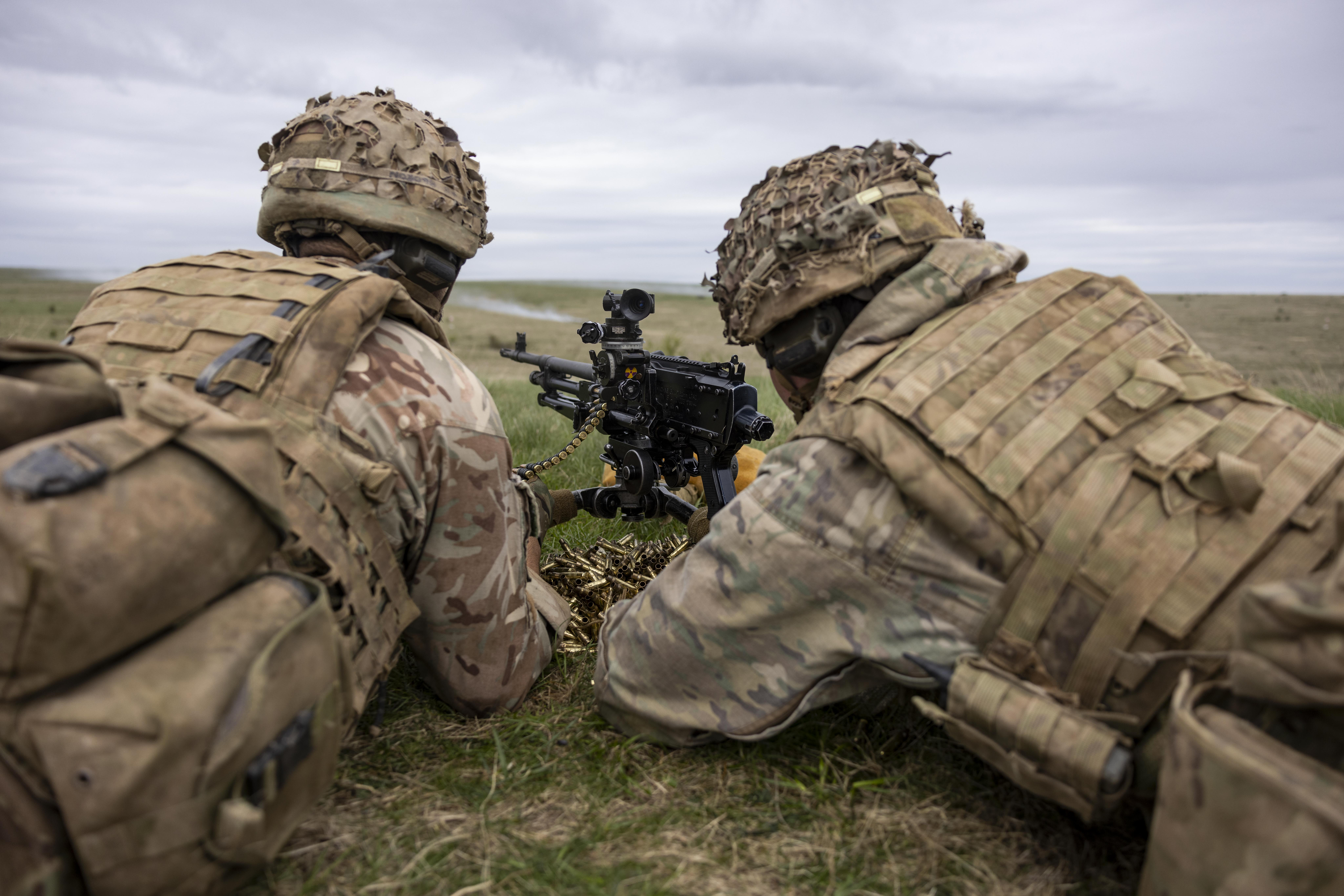
L7A2 GPMG in its sustained fire role configuration with L4A1 Tripod Mounting, buttstock replaced by a recoil buffer, and C2A1 Sight Unit fitted to the left side of the receiver

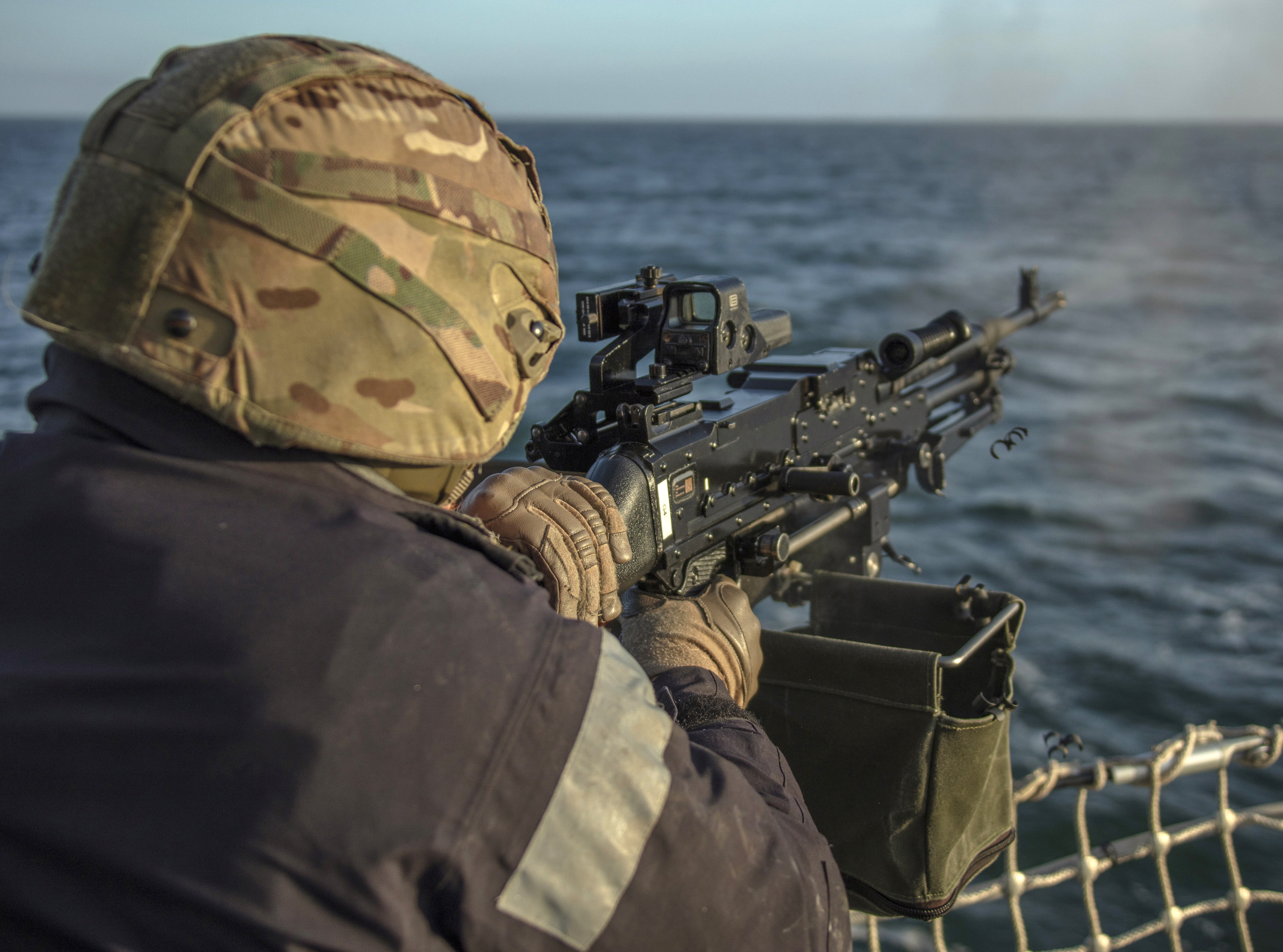
A Gunner from HMS Lancaster's ship's company takes part in a small arms firing at sea (SAFAS) using a pintle-mounted GPMG with a EOTech holographic weapon sight

The L7 general-purpose machine gun was adopted by the British Armed Forces as a replacement for the long-serving Vickers machine gun (in the medium role) and the Bren (in the light assault role), following trials in 1957. Originally made under license from FN by the Royal Small Arms Factory at Enfield Lock from 1961 until the site's closure in 1988, the L7 and its variants were later produced by Manroy Engineering (now FN Herstal UK), and are currently produced by Heckler & Koch. The series remains in service with all components of the British Armed Forces.

There have been two main variants, the L7A1 and L7A2, developed for infantry use, with the L7A2 having superseded the earlier variant. Several other variants have been developed, notably the L8 (produced in the L8A1 and L8A2 versions), modified for mounting inside armoured vehicles (the L37 variant was developed for mounting on armoured vehicles). Although intended to replace the Bren entirely, that light machine gun (re-chambered for 7.62×51mm NATO and re-titled as the L4) continued in use in jungle terrain (especially in the Far East), where there was no requirement for the medium machine gun role, and with secondary units, until the adoption of the L86A1 Light Support Weapon (LSW). The LSW was intended to replace both the L7 and the L4 in the light machine gun role, but dissatisfaction with the L86's sustained fire capabilities and reliability resulted in combat units continuing to utilize the L7 whenever possible (although neither it, nor its 7.62×51mm NATO ammunition was supposed to be issued to infantry platoons).

The British Army, Royal Marines and RAF Regiment were issued with the L110A2 (FN Minimi Para) to replace the LSW as the light section support or fire support weapon. This uses the same NATO-standard 5.56×45mm ammunition as the L85 assault rifle. However a review of requirements led to the withdrawal of both the L110A2 LMG and L86A2 LSW from service in 2018, with the 7.62 mm L7A2 resuming its place in the British Army infantry section. Other variants continue to be used in mounted roles on many British military vehicles, naval vessels and aircraft. In 1961, the Royal Small Arms Factory, Enfield (now BAE Systems) in the United Kingdom, undertook licence production of the MAG in the following versions: L7A2, L8A2, L37A2, L20A1 and the L43A1. These models all use the M13 ammunition belt.

The L7A2, general-purpose machine gun, replaced the L7A1 in service with the British Army. Compared to the MAG Model 60-20, it features, among other minor changes, an improved feed mechanism, a 10-position gas regulator valve, a polymer butt-stock, a provision for 50 round belt-box and a bracket, used to mount optical day- and night-vision sights, mounted to the left side of the receiver. In the sustained fire role, the L7A2 can be mounted on the L4A1 tripod in conjunction with a C2A1 Sight Unit or the sight unit used on the FGM-148 Javelin anti-tank missile system. Fired by a two-man team who are grouped in a specialist Machine Gun Platoon the L7A2 in conjunction with a C2A2 Support Weapons Sight can provide battalion-level direct support fire at ranges up to 1,800 m (1,969 yd) and indirect map and range table predicted support/harassment fire out to 2,500 m (2,734 yd). The indirect firing method exploits the 7.62×51mm NATO useful maximum range, that is defined by the maximum range of a small-arms projectile while still maintaining the minimum kinetic energy required to put unprotected personnel out of action, which is generally believed to be 15 kilogram-meters (147 J / 108 ft⋅lbf). With the tripod and FGM-148 Javelin sight unit indirect fire configuration, British troops in Afghanistan used the L7A2 at ranges of and over 2,700 m (2,953 yd). The average 1,884 m (6,181 ft) elevation of Afghanistan and accompanying low ISA air density significantly contribute to extending the useful maximum range of small-arms projectiles.

The L8A2 coaxial tank machine gun (replaced the L8A1) has a different gas valve switch (closed, single-position) when compared to the analogous Model 60-40, a different flash hider and a modified cocking handle. The weapon also has a trigger group that accepts electrical input and a lever in the feed tray that enables the belt to be removed without lifting the feed tray cover.

Another tank machine gun is the L37A2 (succeeded the L37A1) designed to be mounted on tank turrets, in the commander's position, on wheeled armoured vehicles and on armored personnel carriers. It differs from the L8A2 primarily in its trigger, which was adapted from the L7A2 GPMG. The machine gun can be used in the ground role for self-defense, by dismounted vehicle crew members, the egress kit consists of an L7A2 barrel, bipod and buttstock.

The L20A1 and L20A2 aircraft machine guns were based on the L8A2, from which they differ by having an electrical trigger and a slotted flash suppressor. The L20 is capable of left- or right-handed feeding.

The L43A1, also developed from the L8A2, is a coaxially mounted tank machine gun used to sight-in the vehicle's main gun by firing ballistically matched tracer ammunition at the target to confirm the trajectory visually. A specially fitted barrel bearing and barrel clamp help to maintain consistent mean point-of-impact regardless of barrel temperature.

Originally scheduled to be withdrawn from British Army service in 2015, in April 2025, the Ministry of Defence announced a new out of service date for the L7A2 of 2035, and would be seeking a replacement under the name Project Cairns. However, in June 2026, it was announced that Heckler & Koch (UK) Limited would be awarded a ten-year contract to continue supplying machine guns from their facility in Nottingham.

=== Canadian versions ===
The C6 was first used in Canada for use as a coaxial MG in the Leopard C1 main battle tank. Since then, it has been used in the Canadian Forces with the designation the C6 GPMG, it is used primarily as a platoon level support weapon. One C6 machine gun is assigned to each Rifle platoon. The C6 GPMG is also mounted on a variety of vehicles, including the G-Wagon LUVW, LAV 6.0, TAPV, Leopard 2, and CH-146 Griffon helicopter. In these vehicles, the C6 GPMGs are co-axially and pintle-mounted and used to provide fire support to the infantry or for local defence of the vehicle itself. On the TAPV and LAV 6 ACSV, the C6 can be mounted on an RWS platform. In September 2018, Canada began fielding an improved C6A1 FLEX version; changes include a polymer buttstock which is more durable and easier to decontaminate in a CBRN scenario than the original wooden stock, M1913 picatinny rails for the attachment of pointing devices and optical sighting systems, and an adjustable gas tube regulator to control the rate of fire. The C6A1 is manufactured by Colt Canada, with the company having earlier provided support for the original C6 fleet, and is the first support machine gun to have been manufactured in Canada since the Second World War.

=== China ===
An unlicensed version is made for export by Norinco and made by Changfeng Machinery Co., Ltd as the CQ, 7.62 × 51 (Copy Version) (Now renamed CS/LM1 as of 2006) with an adjustable butt. The weapon was officially produced in 2006 and it was showcased in various foreign military expo conventions.

The XY, 7.62 × 51 is a true copy of the FN MAG made with a wooden stock by Yunnan Xiyi Industry Company Limited.

=== German versions ===
Heckler & Koch attempted to make their own variant of the FN MAG, designated as HK 221. This version was equipped with a set of iron sights that consisted of a rotary drum at the rear and a hooded sight post at the front, as well as a length of Picatinny rail on the receiver, and was meant to compete in the machine gun trials held by the German and French militaries from 2007 to 2008. The trials concluded with the French military selecting the original FN MAG in 2010, while the German military selected the company's MG5 in 2015. Heckler & Koch is also involved with the manufacture of L7-series variants for the British Armed Forces.

=== Indonesian versions ===
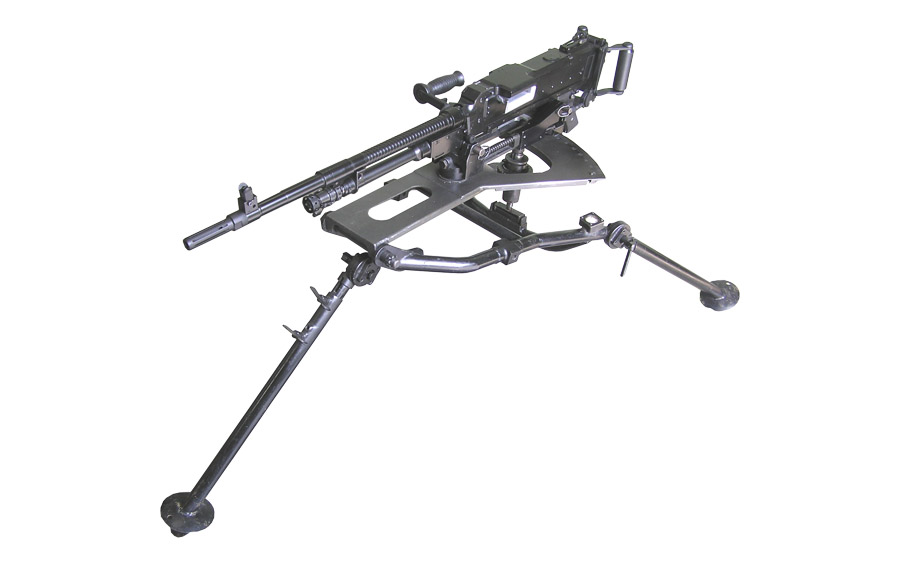
Pindad SM2 V2 on a tripod.

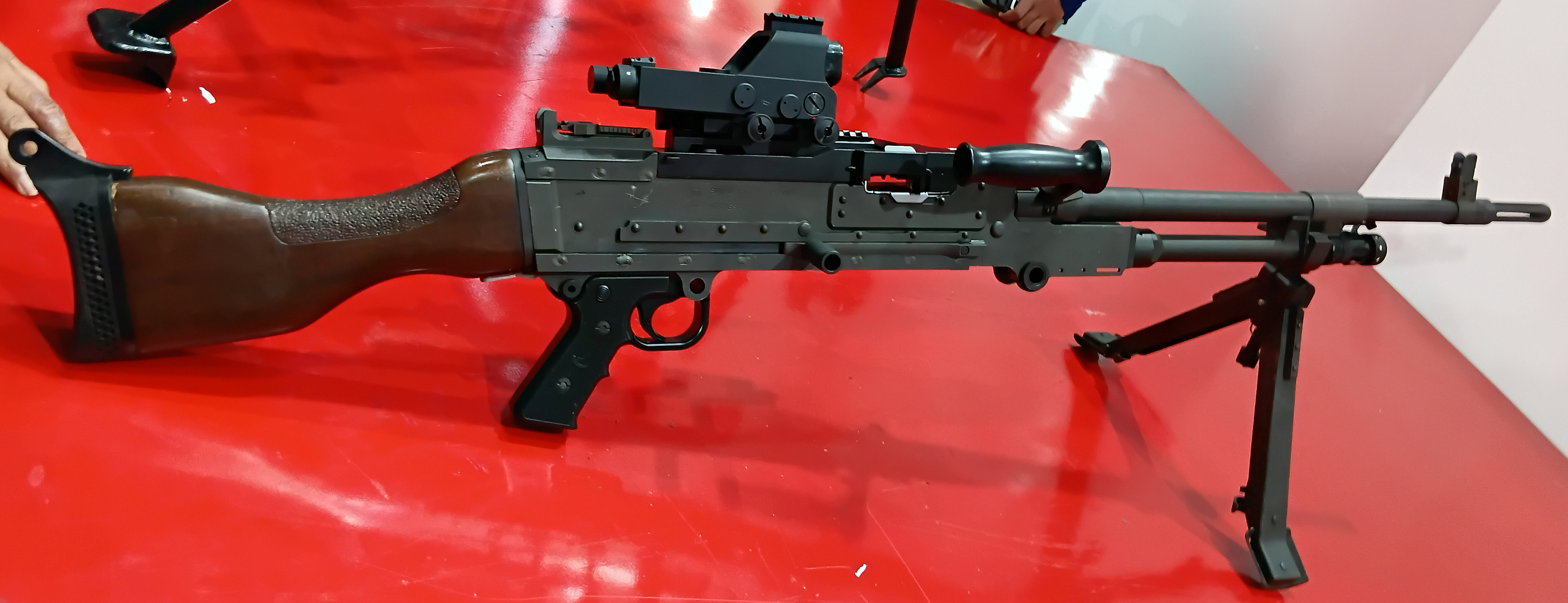
Pindad SM2-V1 equipped with optical holosight

PT Pindad license produced FN MAG in 2003 as SM2. SM2 V1 variant comes with integrated bipod, with a total length of 1275 mm and a weight of 11.6 kg (including stock and bipod). The second variant is called SM2 V2 which is modified as a coaxial gun. The stock is removed by changing the trigger mechanism to the rear of the weapon as in the M2 Browning. This variant has a higher rate of fire of 700-1200 rpm. It is shorter at only 1070 mm in length with a weight (plus coaxial) of 12 kg.

=== Israeli remote control variant ===
In 2020, Iranian nuclear scientist Mohsen Fakhrizadeh was killed by Mossad with an FN MAG, redesigned to fire from a remote control. The modified MAG was powered by artificial intelligence, and weighed over a ton.

=== Swedish Army versions ===
All versions are licence-manufactured by FFV-Carl Gustaf. The Swedish abbreviation for kulspruta (machine gun, lit. "bullet sprayer") is Ksp. Strv is the abbreviation of Stridsvagn (battle tank).

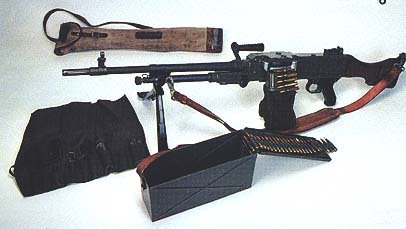
A left-side view of the Kulspruta 58B (Ksp 58B).

Kulspruta 58: Ksp 58, adopted in 1958 using the 6.5×55mm rifle cartridge which at that time was the standard cartridge in the Swedish Army.

Kulspruta 58B: In the early 1970s, the weapon was modified with a new gas regulator and at the same time the barrels were replaced to the new standard 7.62×51mm NATO, same as used by the Ak 4. Ksp 58 replaced the considerably heavier Ksp m/42B in the infantry units. It can be fed with non-disintegrating DM1 or disintegrating M13 linked ammunition belts.

Kulspruta 58C: On Combat Vehicle 90, this version replaced the previously used Ksp m/39 in the third quarter of 2004.

Kulspruta 58 Strv: stripped variant mainly used for fixed mounting in tanks. Phased out along with Stridsvagn 103.

Kulspruta 58D: Reserved designation for the renovated and modified Ksp 58B. The trial version is referred to as 'Ksp 58DF', where the 'F' stands for 'Försök' (Experimental). Some of the modifications:

- A MIL-STD 1913 Picatinny rail system added. Half of the weapons feature an adjustable rail - the others a fixed.
- Red dot sight (Aimpoint CompCS).
- The carrying handle is shortened to half its original length. This was necessary in order to fit an extended rail for sight systems.
- Cbuttstock butt stock or folding stock.
- 100 mm shorter barrel.
- Better and shorter flash hider to reduce the length of the weapon and to produce a smaller muzzle flash, which means less disruption to the user's night vision.
- Fluted barrel in order to reduce the weight and better dissipate the heat of the barrel.
- Gas regulator has only 4 settings (instead of 8). The last position is painted red and is intended for emergency use.
- Larger 100-round ammunition pouches replaced 50-round pouches.
- New ammunition cases.
- New equipment bags.
- Bi-pod is painted green.
- There is a sheet for protection / one side green other side white / summer & winter camouflage.
- The weight of the MG is the same, but the entire system is 3 kg (6.5 lbs) lighter.

=== US versions ===
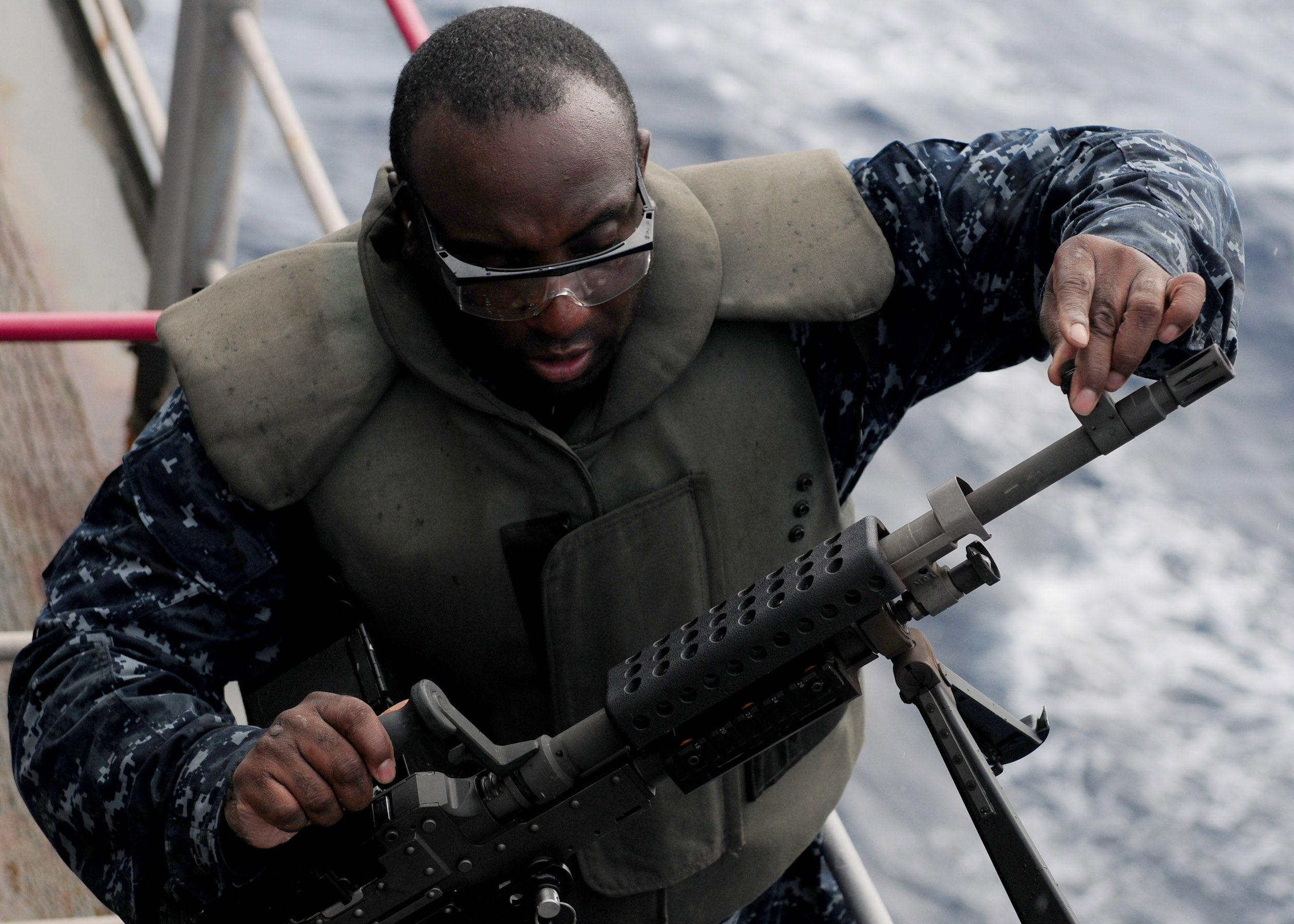
The heat shield on the M240B.

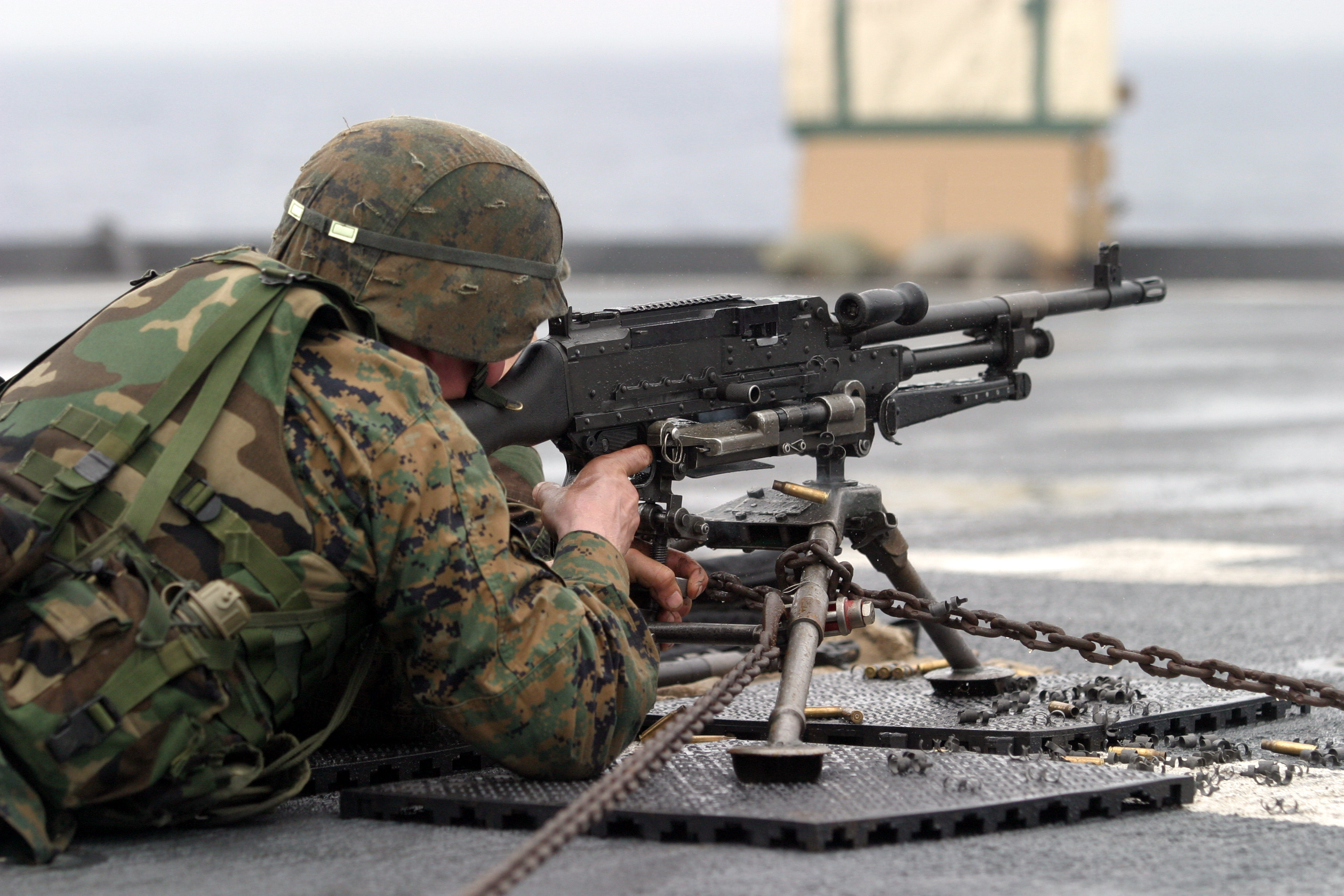
A US Marine Corps tripod-mounted M240G.

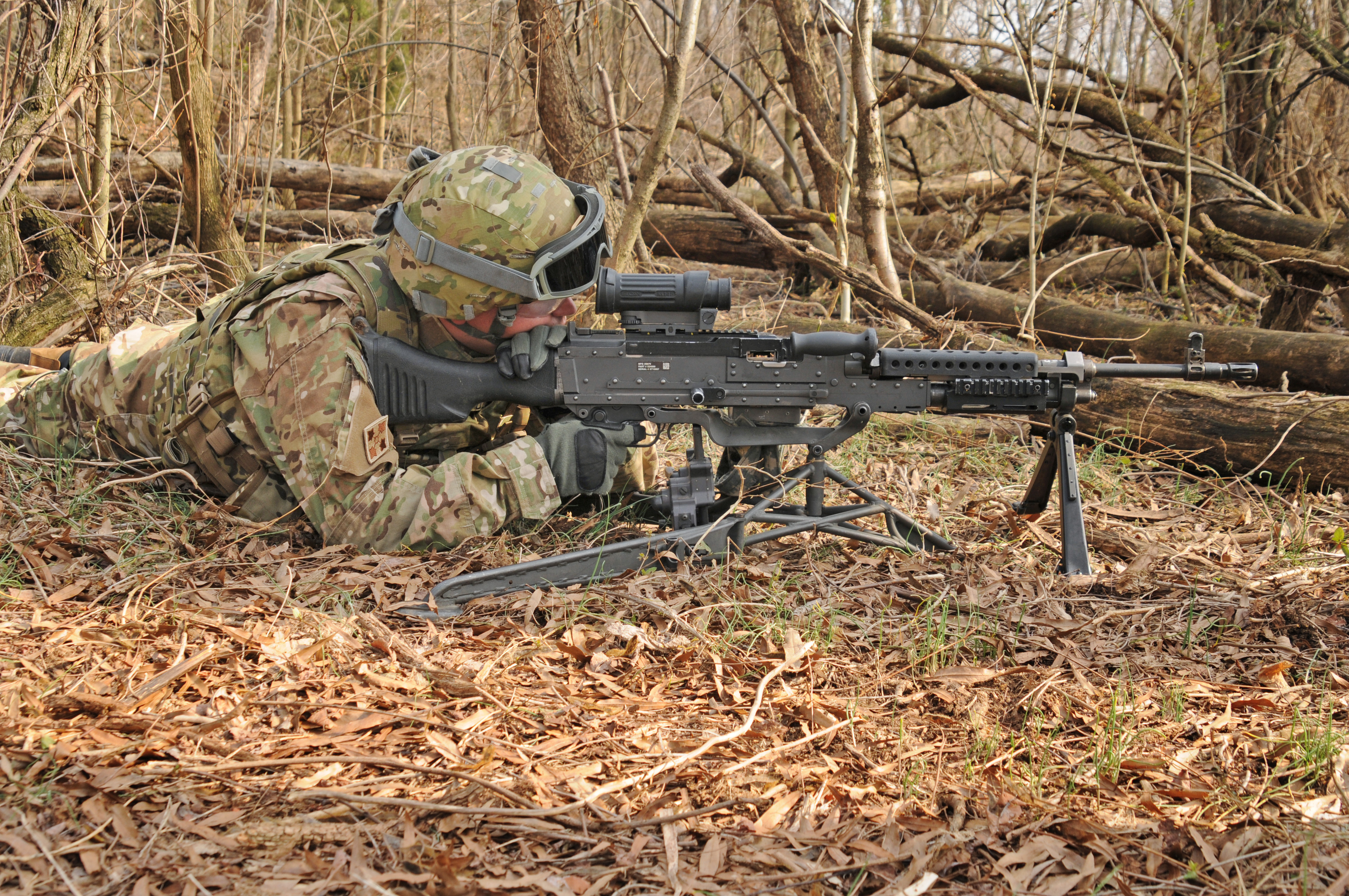
M240L paired with the lighter M192 tripod reducing system weight by 5.5 pounds (2.5 kg).

On January 14, 1977, the US Army awarded a contract to FN Herstal for the delivery of a modernized Model 60-40 variant tank machine gun designated the M240. Initially, the firearms were produced in Belgium. Currently they are manufactured in the US by FN's US wholly owned subsidiary FNMI (FN Manufacturing Inc.) located in Columbia, South Carolina, and by U.S. Ordnance in McCarran, Nevada.

The M240 is built in several versions:

- M240 standard coaxial machine gun used in US armored vehicles. It is used in the M60 series of tanks (where it replaced the M73/M219 7.62 mm machine guns) and the M1 Abrams family. It has an electrically operated trigger and a reloading lever. Compared to the MAG Model 60-40, the M240 has a different flash hider and gas valve.
- M240B is a modernized derivative of the M240G, which features a perforated hand-guard and heat shroud, a MIL-STD-1913 rail integral with the receiver top cover, which enables the use of optical day and night sights, a new synthetic stock and a new ammunition container. It was selected to be the U.S. Army's new medium machine gun on December 1, 1995, replacing the M60 machine gun - it defeated the M60E4 during trials. M240Bs are also replacing M240Gs in USMC service. The M240B weighs 12.5 kg (28 lb) and has a length of 1,245 mm (49.0 in). The rate of fire is 650–750 rounds/min.
- M240C with a right-hand feed system. It is used in the M2 and M3 Bradley series of infantry fighting vehicles as a coaxial gun to the main armament.
- M240D an upgrade of the M240E1 and is optimized for use in military helicopters in a pintle-mounted configuration. The M240D is also supplied with an egress kit for dismounted use.
- M240E1 installed since 1987 on LAV-series wheeled armored fighting vehicles, has a spade-type grip with an integral trigger and cocking mechanism.
- M240G introduced into service with the United States Marine Corps and the 75th Ranger Regiment in the mid-1990s in place of the M60E3. The M240G is used on the M122A1 tripod for stationary use, and is also used in vehicular and aircraft mounts. It weighs 10.99 kg (24.2 lb), has an overall length of 1,245 mm (49.0 in) and a rate of fire of 650–950 rounds/min.
- M240H an improved version of the M240D. The M240H features a rail-equipped feed cover, an improved flash suppressor and has been configured so it can be more quickly converted to infantry standard using an Egress Kit. The M240H is 41.2 in (1,050 mm) long, has a 23.6 in (600 mm) barrel, and has an empty weight of 26.3 lb (11.9 kg).
- M240L is a development of the M240B reduced in weight by 5.5 pounds (2.5 kg). The weight savings on the M240L are achieved by incorporating titanium and by using alternative fabricating methods for major components. A short barrel and collapsible stock are available.

=== Turkey ===
The Turkish military equipment producer MKEK announced in 2017 a licensed version of the MAG designated PMT-76/57A to be made under the National Machinegun Project (Turkish: Milli Makineli Tüfek Projesi - MMT). The 57 name was inspired by the 57th Infantry Regiment. Twelve PMT-76 prototypes were tested in 2017 and an order of an undisclosed number was placed. The PMT-76/57A entered Turkish service in 2021 and was exported to Kosovo in 2023.

== Users ==
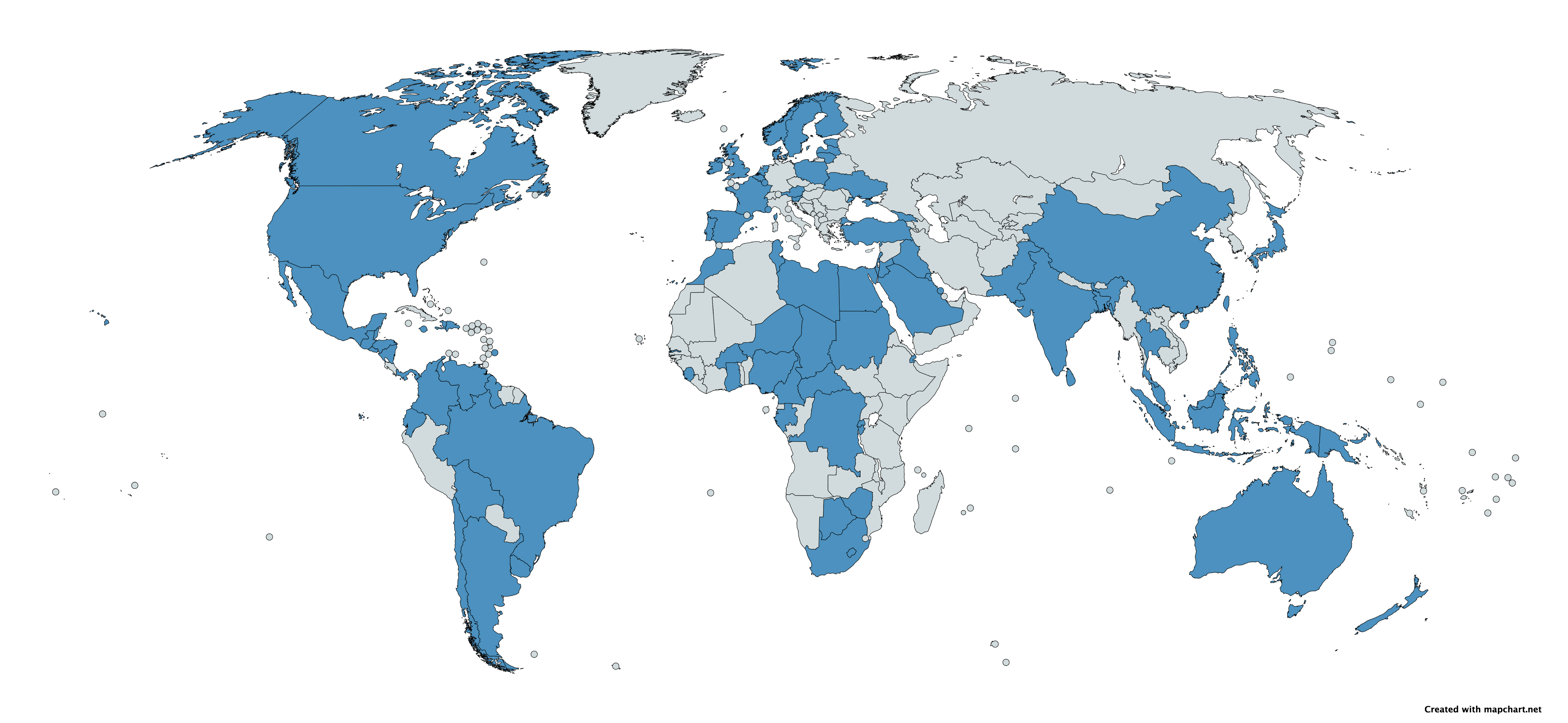
Map with MAG users in blue

- Argentina: The MAG is in use in the Argentine Army as the 7,62 Ametralladora Tipo 60-20 MAG after being purchased in the 1960s. The MAG saw action during the Falklands War. Argentine MAGs were license-manufactured by the state-owned Dirección General de Fabricaciones Militares (DGFM) arsenal.

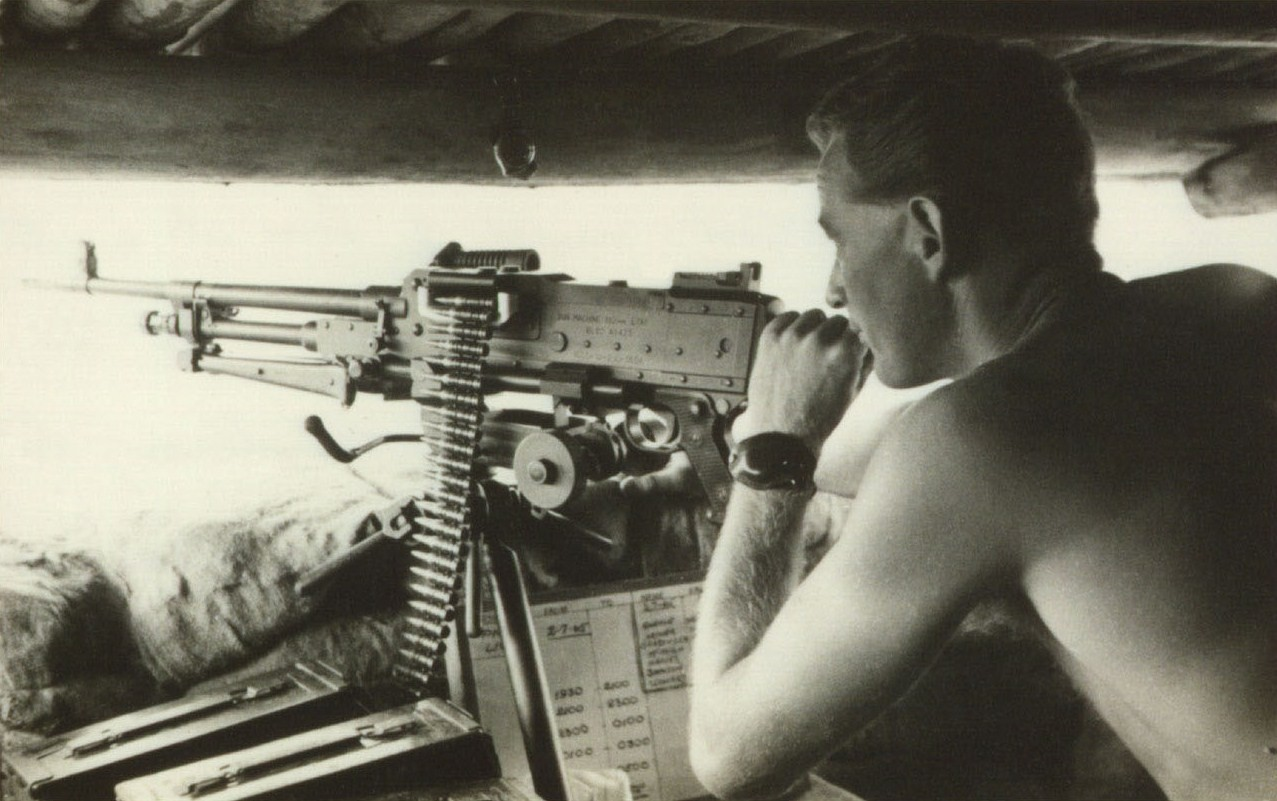
An Australian soldier in Borneo manning a British L7A1 during the Indonesia–Malaysia confrontation, 1965.

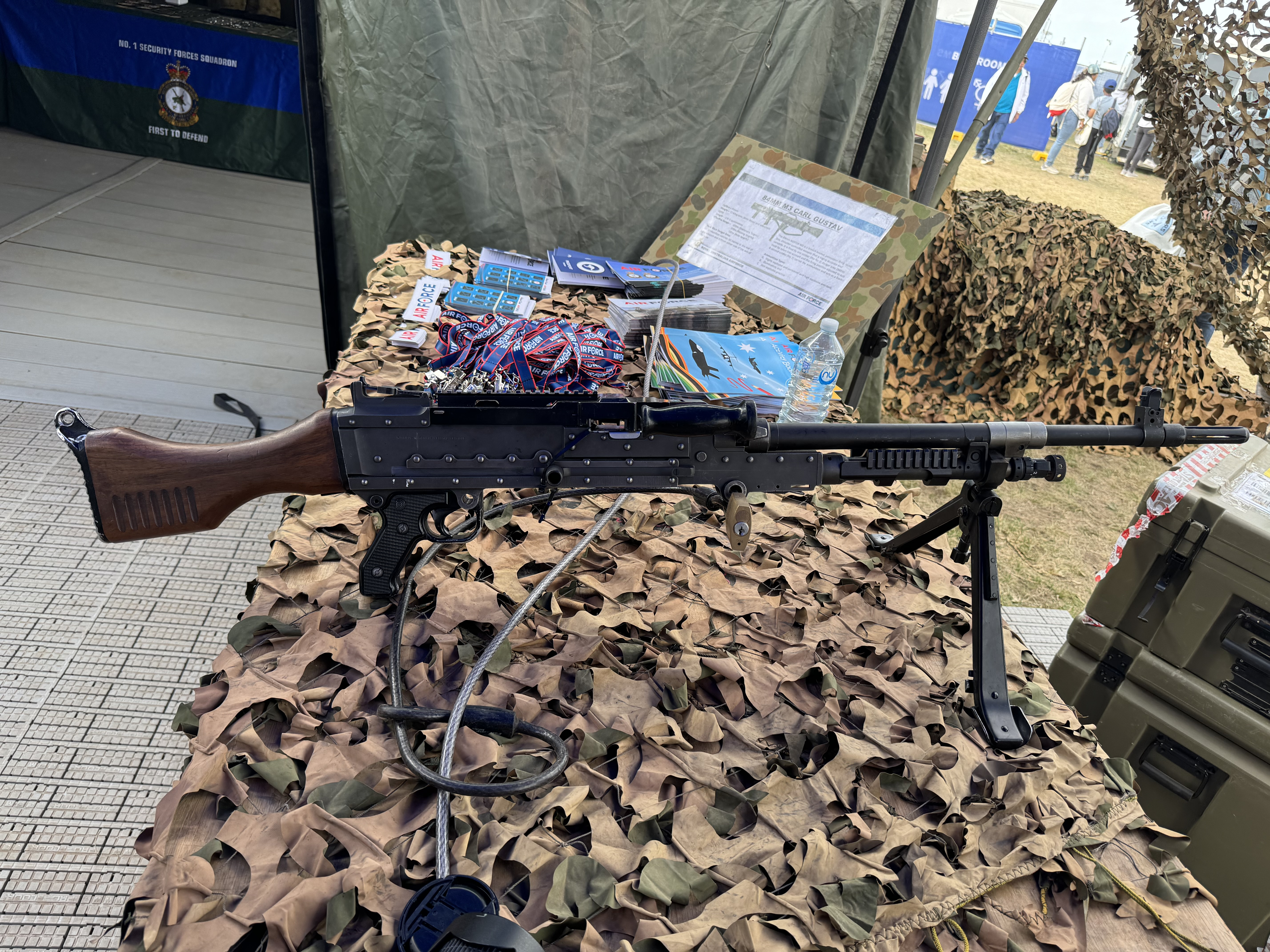
Australian Defence Force FN MAG 58

- Australia: The MAG is the standard GPMG of the Australian Defence Force, in particular the Australian Army, where it is known as the MAG 58. It is also used by the Australian Border Force.
- Austria: The MAG is used by the Austrian Army as the 7,62 mm MG FNMAG/Pz and is used in the Schützenpanzer Ulan and the Leopard 2A4. It's also used as the armament of the S-70A-42 Black Hawk helicopters.
- Bangladesh
- Bahrain
- Barbados
- Belgium: Designated MAG M2 and MAG M3 for the coax version.
- Belize
- Bolivia
- Botswana
- Brazil: Standard support weapon of the Brazilian Army, known as the M971. Used by the Coordenadoria de Recursos Especiais (from the Civil Police of Rio de Janeiro), the Federal Police, and the Brazilian Marine Corps (Mod B60-20).
- Brunei
- Burkina Faso
- Burundi
- Cameroon

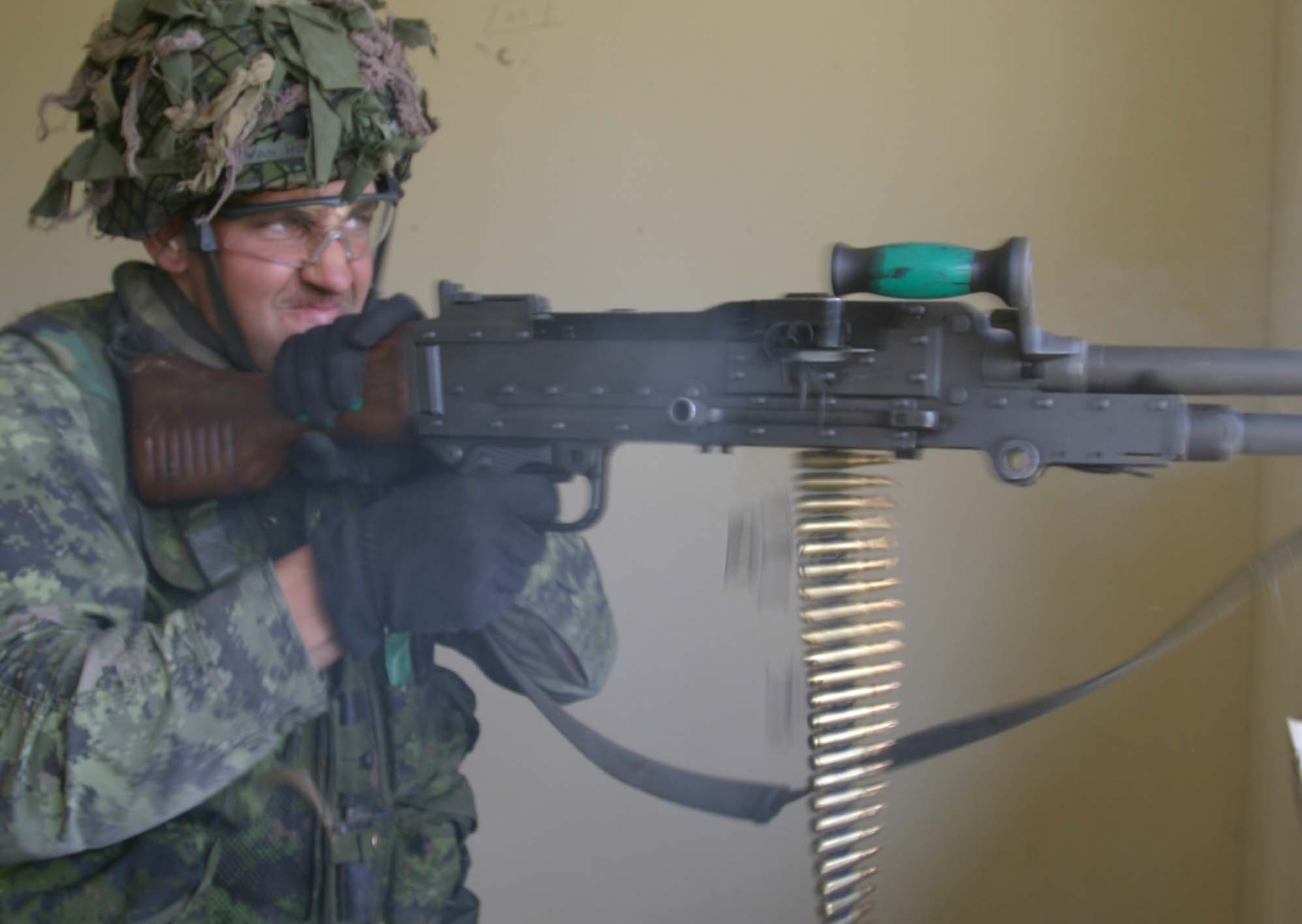
A Canadian soldier fires the C6 variant of the MAG.

- Canada
- Central African Republic
- Chad
- Chile
- Colombia
- Croatia: M240 coaxial variant on M2 Bradley
- Democratic Republic of Congo
- Denmark: Used as armament in EH101.
- Djibouti
- Dominican Republic
- Ecuador
- El Salvador
- Egypt: Made under license by the Maadi Company for Engineering Industries. Egyptian-made MAGs known as Helwan 920.
- Estonia: The Swedish-made version known as the Ksp 58B has been adopted as the standard MG.
- Finland:100 machine guns came from the Netherlands with Leopard 2A6 MBTs in 2015-2019
- France: Selected in 2010. 500 machine guns were purchased in 2011, and an additional 10,000 machine guns will eventually be supplied.
- Gabon
- Gambia
- Georgia: M240L variant in use.
- Ghana
- Greece: at least 1,000 in service.
- Guatemala
- Guyana
- Haiti
- Honduras
- Hong Kong: Used by the Royal Hong Kong Regiment.
- Hungary
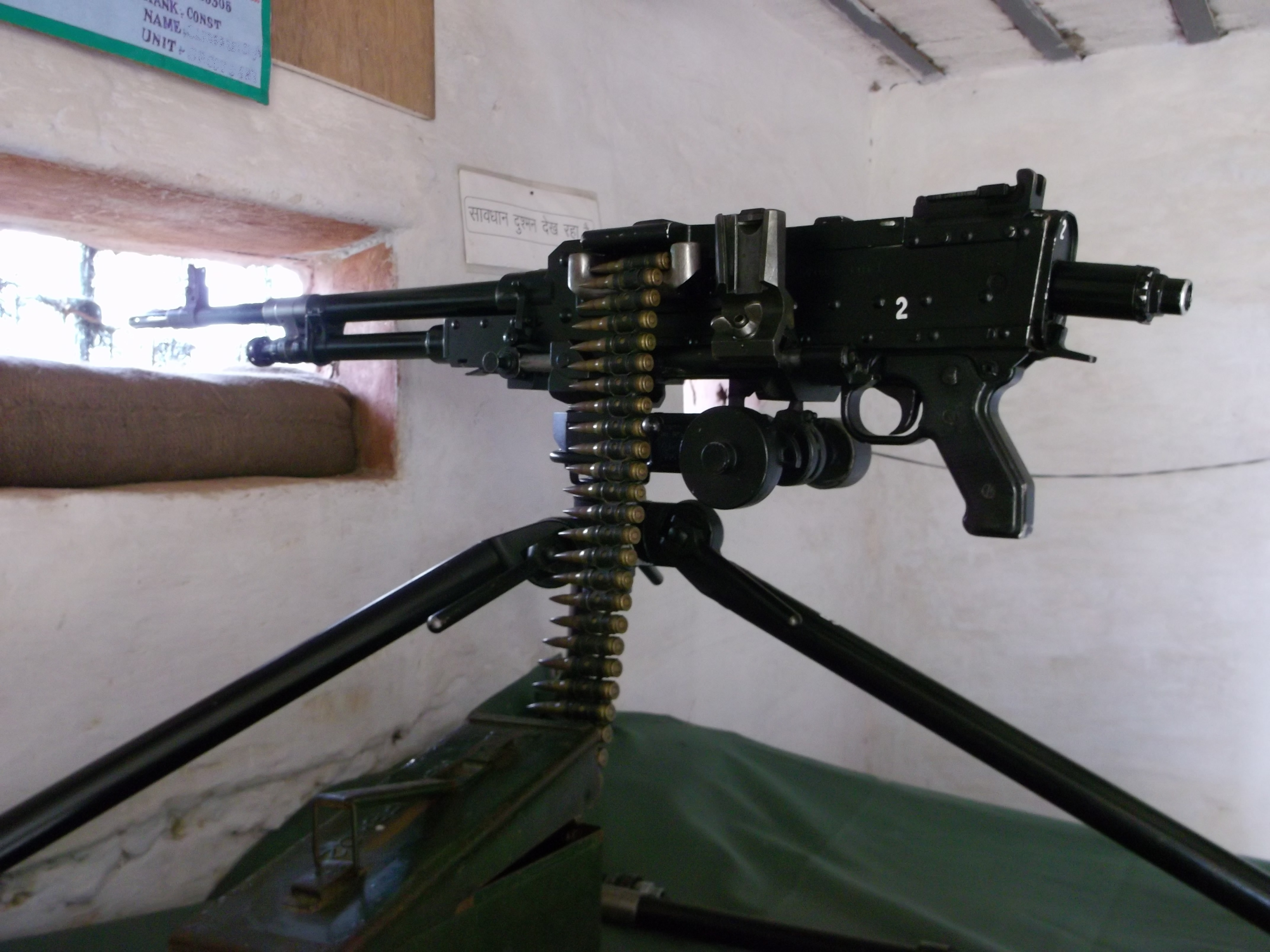
- Indian version of FN MAG at Border Outpost manned by BSF
  India: Manufactured by the Ordnance Factories Board under license.
- Indonesia: Made under license by Pindad as Pindad SM-2 (previously known as SPM2 GPMG). Standard general-purpose machine gun of Indonesian National Armed Forces. M240 (M240C/D) variants used as coaxial & pintle mounted gun on Leopard 2 Main Battle Tank. Also used by the Indonesian Maritime Security Agency.
- Iraq
- Ireland: Used by the Irish Defence Forces.

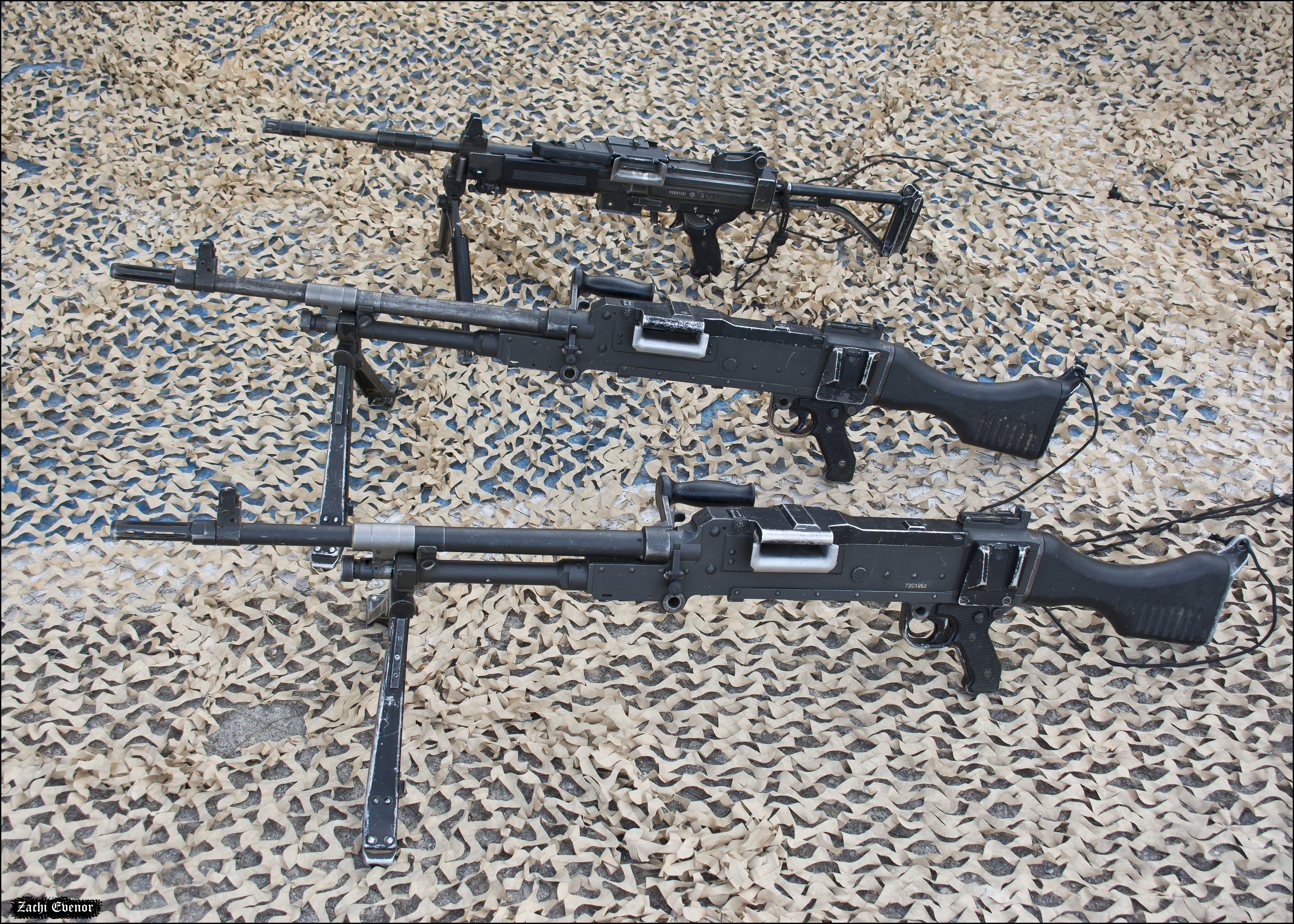
IWI Negev (top) and two FN MAG (bottom)

- Israel: Used by the Israel Defense Forces alongside IMI Negev and Negev NG7. Closed muzzle was adopted in Armored Forces to prevent muzzle flash.
- Jamaica: Battalion-level fire support weapon of the Jamaica Defence Force.
- Japan: M240C coaxial variant mounted on the AAV7 amphibious vehicle used by the JGSDF Amphibious Rapid Deployment Brigade.
- Jordan
- Katanga
- Kuwait
- Latvia: The Swedish-made version known as the Ksp 58B has been adopted by the Latvian National Guard as the standard MG.
- Lebanon: Adopted as standard MG by the Lebanese Armed Forces.
- M60
- Lesotho
- Libya
- Lithuania: Lithuanian Armed Forces.
- Luxembourg
- Malaysia
- Mexico
- Monaco: Compagnie des Carabiniers du Prince.
- Morocco: MAG-60-20 Infanterie T1.
- Netherlands: Used by the Royal Navy, Marine Corps, Royal Air Force and Royal Army. The designation used by the Marine Corps is Mitrailleur van 7,62 mm NATO MAG FN whereas the Army designates the weapon as Mitrailleur 7.62 mm MAG. These legacy MAGs were replaced by newer models, featuring rails and polymer furniture.
- New Zealand: The New Zealand Defence Force originally purchased the British-made L7A2 version of the MAG in 1976. These are now being replaced by several versions of the Belgian-made MAG-58, which was originally introduced into service as part of the introduction of the NZLAV. The FN-made MAGs are now used in the infantry light machine gun (LMG) role as a flexible mounted machine gun on the LOV and NH90, Agusta Westland A109, the Kaman SH-2G(I), and as a heavy sustained fire machine gun.
- Nicaragua: Adopted by the Guardia Nacional de Nicaragua in the 1970s as standard MG.
- Niger
- Nigeria
- Norway On Leopard 2A4 MBTs bought from the Netherlands. Supposed to replace the Rheinmetall MG3 in Norwegian service.
- Pakistan
- Palestine - In service with the Palestinian national security forces.
- Panama
- Papua New Guinea: Likely acquired from Australian stocks.
- Peru
- Philippines: M240B delivered in 2021.
- Poland: M240C tank variant were used on the M1A2 Abrams Main Battle Tank, other M240 variants were also purchased.
- Portugal: Used by Portuguese Army on Pandur II IFV and Leopard 2A6 tank and by the Portuguese Navy on the Karel Doorman-class frigates.
- Rhodesia
- Romania: M240B used by Special Operations Forces.
- Rwanda
- Saudi Arabia
- Sierra Leone: Sierra Leone Army used ex-British L7A2 GPMG. Some were captured by rebels.
- Singapore: In use by Singapore Armed Forces and Police Coast Guard. Licensed production carried out by Ordnance Development and Engineering Company of Singapore, now integrated into ST Engineering. Two versions produced, one infantry assault variant fitted with a bi-pod, the other co-axial model for armored vehicle or vehicle mountings. One MAG is issued to each rifle platoon. It is always referred to as GPMG or simply MG. ST Engineering manufacture it as the 7.62 General Purpose Machine Gun.
- Slovenia
- South Africa
- South Korea: M240D machine guns are mounted on the MH-60R helicopters acquired by the Republic of Korea Navy.
- Spain: Used by the Spanish Army Airmobile Force and the Spanish Marine Infantry.
- Sri Lanka
- Sudan
- Slovakia: Mounted on BOV 8x8 VYDRA
- Sweden: Used by the Swedish Armed Forces, license made in Sweden and designated as the Ksp 58 (short for "Kulspruta", Swedish for "Machine gun" of model 1958).

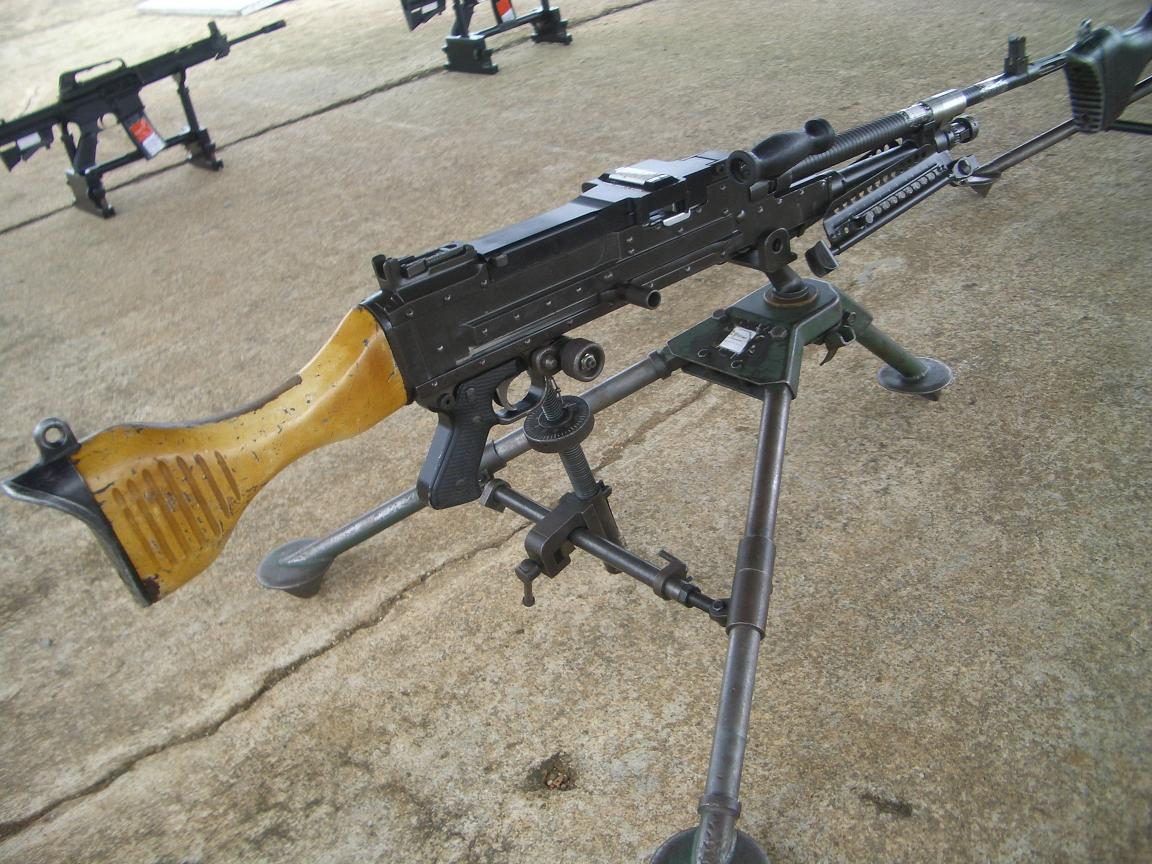
The Type 74 machine gun, a Taiwanese version of the MAG.

- Taiwan: produced locally as T74 GPMG.
- Thailand: Used by the Royal Thai Army, designated as the Type 38 General-purpose machine gun (ปก.38) in 1995.
- Tunisia
- Turkey
- Ukraine: unspecified number received during the Russian invasion in 2022. Some are C6 GPMGs from Canada.
- United Kingdom
- United States:
  - Used by the U.S. Military, designated as the M240.
  - Texas Highway Patrol 5 M240s mounted on each Davis-class patrol boat
  - Los Angeles County Sheriff's Department 2 M240B's
  - Long Beach Police Department 2 M240Bs
- Uruguay
- Venezuela
- Zimbabwe

=== Non-state users ===
- Democratic Forces for the Liberation of Rwanda
- Provisional IRA.

== See also ==
- FN Minimi—FN MAG scaled down to 5.56 NATO
- Mk 48 machine gun—FN Minimi in 7.62×51mm NATO for United States Special Operations Command (USSOCOM)
- FN EVOLYS—Lightweight weapon
- IWI Negev and Negev-NG7—Israeli weapon
- Type 67 machine gun, QJY-88, QJS-161 and QJY-201—Chinese weapon
- Sumitomo NTK-62—an outwardly similar Japanese weapon
- S&T Motiv K16—South Korean derivative designed for its armed forces new general-purpose machine gun, replacing the M60 machine gun
- Heckler & Koch MG5—A German derivative designed for French and German armed forces new general purpose machine gun trials
- PKM and PKP Pecheneg machine gun—Russian squad automatic weapons
- Vektor SS-77—A South African weapon designed as replacement for the FN-MAG
