= M3 tripod =

Tripod for M2HB Machine Gun

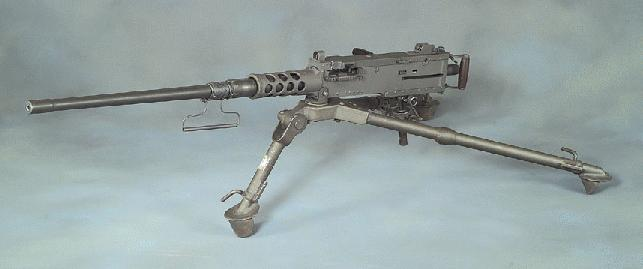
M2HB heavy machine gun on M3 tripod

The M3 tripod is a weapon mount used on the M2HB Browning machine gun and the Mk 19 grenade launcher. The M3 tripod has a total weight of 20 kilograms (44 pounds). The M205 tripod, formerly the XM205, is intended to replace it.

== Specifications ==
The M3 tripod is designed for portability but due to its solid metal construction weighs in at 20kg (44lb). When fully extended it measures 14"(35.56cm)high by 61 1/2"(156.21cm)wide by 76"(193.04cm)long. When collapsed it measures 48 1/2"x 8"x 7" (123.19cm x 20.32cm x17.78cm). It has a total traverse range of 425mils with the T&E mechanism (traversing and elevating mechanism) and 6,400 mils without it. The maximum elevation is 100mils and the maximum depression is 250mils with the T&E mechanism. Without the T&E Mechanism, the tripod can angle the weapon at 285 mils up or 335 mils down from zero.

== See also ==
- XM205 tripod
- M2 tripod
- M63 ground mount
- M122 tripod
- M192 Lightweight Ground Mount
