= M205 tripod =

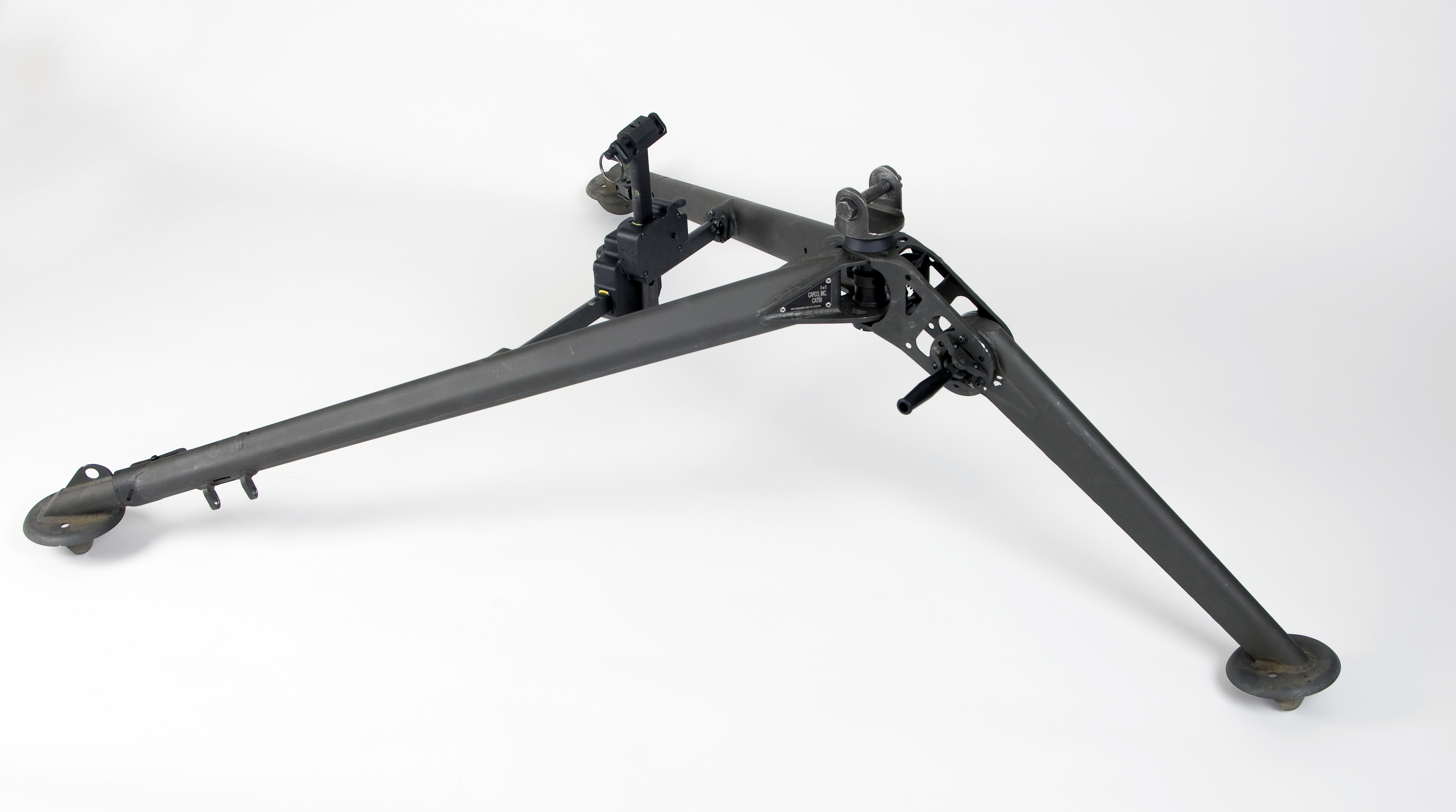
Prototype

The M205 Lightweight Tripod for Heavy Machine Guns is the replacement for the current M3 tripod in support of the M2 machine gun and Mk 19 grenade launcher used in the United States armed forces. The soldier will experience less weight burden with the M205 Lightweight Tripod than with the standard M3 Tripod (50.3 lb (22.8 kg), including the pintle and T&E), and will be able to take advantage of the enhanced tripod's integrated traverse and elevation mechanism for quicker, more accurate target engagement.

Not only is the M205 (34 lbs) lighter than the M3 by over 16 lbs (33%), it is stronger and provides a more stable (lower dispersion) firing platform than the M3.

The M205 was first fielded by the 1st Armored Division in November 2013. In addition to being lighter than the M3, it has an integrated Traverse & Elevation (T&E) mechanism that can be operated with one hand for faster and more accurate engagement. The legs have spades to dig into dirt or sand to be a stable platform. The M205 when stowed is 46 in (3.8 ft) long, 8 in (20 cm) high, and 12 in (30 cm) wide.

== See also ==
- M2 tripod
- M192 Lightweight Ground Mount
