= M2 tripod =

US machine gun tripod

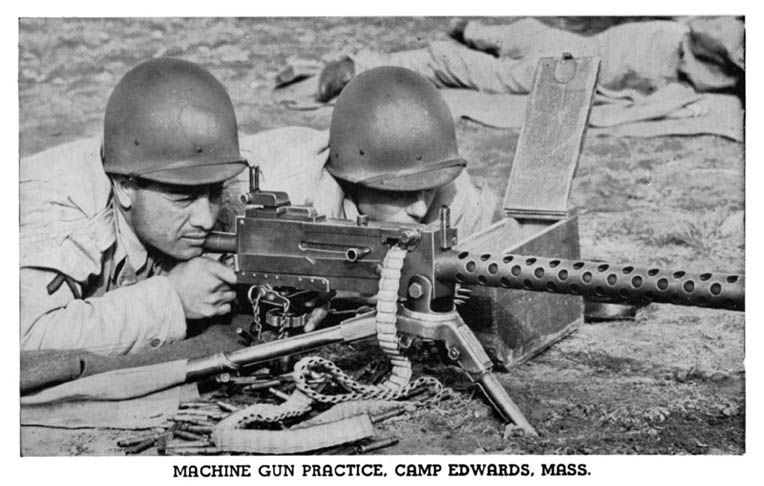

The M2 Tripod is a U.S. machine gun tripod originally used with the Browning M1919 infantry machine gun. Since then, it has seen several redesigns, but remained largely the same. In this fashion, the M2 tripod has seen combat service in every conflict that the U.S. Army and Marine Corps has been involved in since World War II. It has also been widely used by numerous other nations, such as U.S. Allies in various wars, especially those countries that used the same machine guns as the United States military.

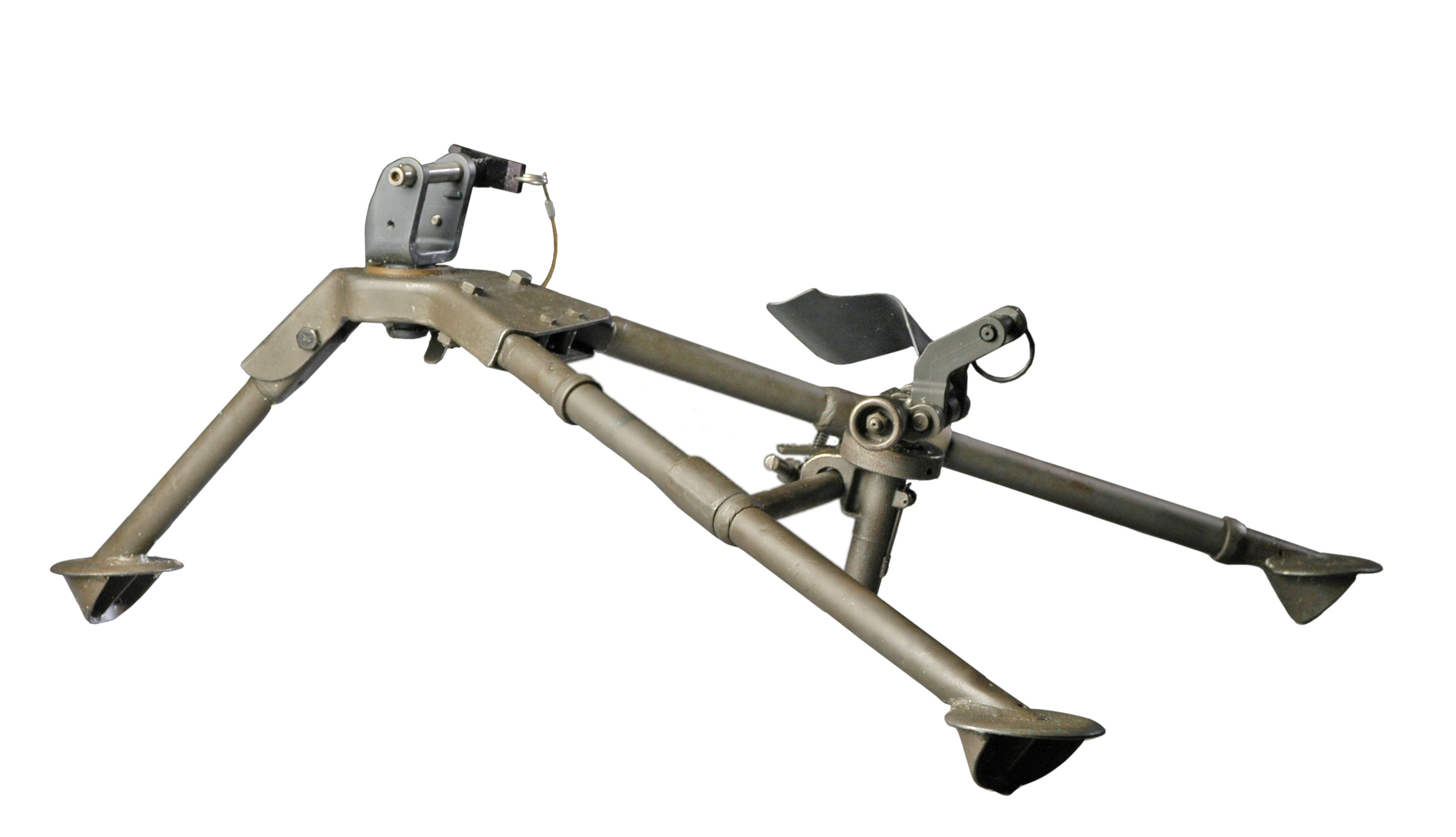
The M122A1 tripod

Modern U.S. machine guns, such as the M60, M249 and M240 series machine guns, use slightly updated versions of the M2, designated the M122 tripod. The M60 was originally going to be used on an experimental M91 tripod, but the M122 was selected over it in the 1950s. The M122 weighs 16 pounds (7.3 kilograms). The differences between the M2 and M122 are found in the types of mounting pintles and the traverse & elevation mechanisms. The actual tripod is referred to as the "tripod leg assembly" and is essentially identical among all models. Many current issue M122 tripods in fact were originally M2 tripods, and had new markings applied when refurbished and matched with mounting pintles for M60, M240 or M249 machineguns. The M122 tripod has started to be replaced by the M192 Lightweight Ground Mount, an advanced lightweight tripod fielded in the early 2000s.

== See also ==
- M3 tripod
- M63 ground mount
- M192 Lightweight Ground Mount
