= M192 lightweight ground mount =

US firearms tripod

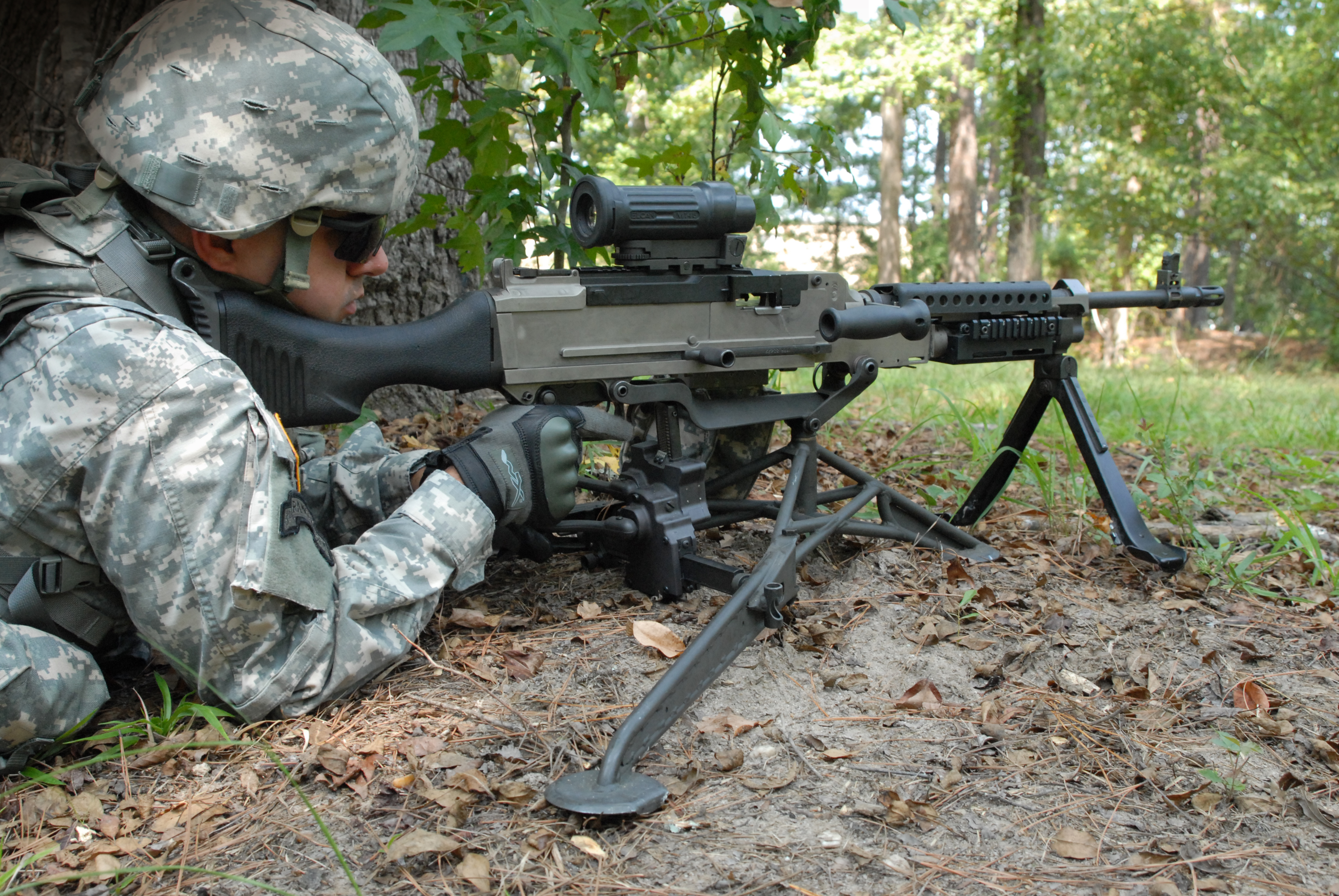
M240E6 machine gun (weight reduction program) on the M192 lightweight ground mount

The M192 lightweight ground mount is a tripod fielded by the United States armed forces. It was designed and developed by Capco, Incorporated under contract through Picatinny Arsenal to replace the M122 tripod. The United States Army named the tripod one of 2005's top ten inventions. It was designed for use with the M249, M240B, and M240L.

== Design ==
At 11.5 lb (5 kg), the M192 is 6.5 lb (3 kg) lighter than its predecessor. Unlike the M122, its rear legs are independently movable and stored in a forward position. Because of this design, there is no need for a locking bar connecting the two legs.

Additionally, the M192 features an integrated traversing and elevation (T&E) mechanism. Instead of the M122's ratcheting screw method of operation and locking traversing bar, the M192 uses a pair of levers, which unlock the gun's position. The levers are designed to allow the gunner to make "bold adjustments" or "minor adjustments", depending on which direction the levers are pushed. If the levers are pulled backward, the mechanism is released for bold adjustments. If they are pushed down or up, each time will engage a ratchet mechanism for minor adjustments.

Due to its lighter weight and different configuration, it is claimed that machine gun crews can emplace the M192 more quickly than the M122.

== Usage ==
The M192 began being fielded in 2005 and is part of the Rapid Fielding Initiative.

== See also ==
- M205 tripod
- M2 tripod
- M3 tripod
