= Proportional myoelectric control =

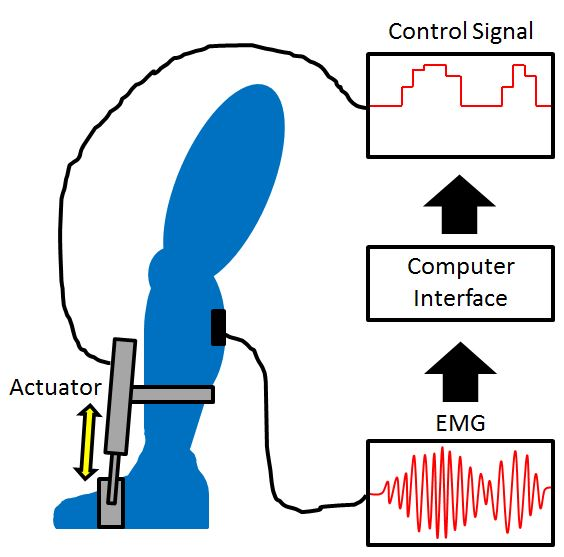
Depiction of myoelectric control of an ankle exoskeleton

Proportional myoelectric control can be used to (among other purposes) activate robotic lower limb exoskeletons. A proportional myoelectric control system utilizes a microcontroller or computer that inputs electromyography (EMG) signals from sensors on the leg muscle(s) and then activates the corresponding joint actuator(s) proportionally to the EMG signal.

== Background ==
A robotic exoskeleton is a type of orthosis that uses actuators to either assist or resist the movement of a joint of an intact limb; this is not to be confused with a powered prosthesis, which replaces a missing limb. There are four purposes that robotic lower limb exoskeletons can accomplish:

- Enhancement of human performance, which typically deals with increasing strength or endurance (see Powered exoskeletons)
- Long-term assistance, which aims to provide impaired individuals with the ability to walk by themselves while wearing an exoskeleton
- Study of human locomotion, which utilizes robotic exoskeletons to better understand human neuromuscular control, energetics, and/or kinematics of locomotion
- Post-injury rehabilitation, which is intended to help an individual recover from an injury (such as a stroke, spinal cord injury, or other neurological disabilities) by wearing an exoskeleton for a short time during training in order to perform better later without the use of the exoskeleton

Robotic lower-limb exoskeletons can be controlled by several methods, including a footswitch (a pressure sensor attached to the bottom of the foot), gait-phase estimation (using joint angles to determine the current phase of walking), and myoelectric control (using electromyography). This article focuses on myoelectric control.

== Control methods ==
Sensors on the skin detect electromyography (EMG) signals from the muscles of the wearer's leg(s). EMG signals can be measured from just one muscle or many, depending on the type of the exoskeleton and how many joints are actuated. Each signal measured is then sent to a controller, which is either an onboard microcontroller (mounted to the exoskeleton) or to a nearby computer. Onboard microcontrollers are used for long-term assistive devices since the wearer must be able to walk in different locations while wearing the exoskeleton, whereas computers not carried by the exoskeleton can be used for therapeutic or research purposes since the wearer does not have to walk very far in a clinical or lab environment.

The controller filters out noise from the EMG signals and then normalizes them so as to better analyze the muscle activation pattern. The normalized EMG value of a muscle represents its activation percentage, since the EMG signal is normalized by dividing it by the maximum possible EMG reading for the muscle it came from. The maximum EMG reading is generated when a muscle is fully contracted. An alternative method to normalization is to proportionally match the actuator power to the EMG signal between a minimum activation threshold and an upper saturation level.

=== Direct proportional myoelectric control ===
With a proportional myoelectric controller, the power sent to an actuator is proportional to the amplitude of the normalized EMG signal from a muscle. When the muscle is inactive, the actuator receives no power from the controller, and when the muscle is fully contracted, the actuator produces maximum torque about the joint it controls. For example, a powered ankle-foot orthosis (AFO) could employ a pneumatic artificial muscle to provide plantar flexion torque proportional to the activation level of the soleus (one of the calf muscles). This control method enables the exoskeleton to be controlled by the same neural pathways as the wearer's biological muscles and has been shown to allow individuals to walk with a more normal gait than other control methods, such as using a footswitch. Proportional myoelectric control of robotic lower limb exoskeletons has advantages over other control methods, such as:

- Its physiological nature allows for an effective way to scale the magnitude of mechanical assistance from the exoskeleton
- It results in reduced biological muscle recruitment versus kinematic based control methods
- It allows easy adaptation of the exoskeleton control for new motor tasks

However, proportional myoelectric control also has disadvantages compared to other control methods, including:

- The surface electrode interface can often cause difficulties in obtaining a reliable EMG signal
- The system requires tuning to determine the appropriate thresholds and gains
- The musculoskeletal system has many synergistic muscles that are not easily accessible via surface EMG electrodes
- Since neurological disorders result in decreased neuromuscular control, some individuals may not have sufficient neural control to allow them to use an exoskeleton with myoelectric control

=== Proportional myoelectric control with flexor inhibition ===
Direct proportional control works well when each joint of the exoskeleton is actuated in one direction (uni-directional actuation), such as a pneumatic piston only bending the knee, but is less effective when two joint actuators work in opposition (bi-directional actuation). An example of this would be ankle exoskeleton using one pneumatic artificial muscle for dorsiflexion based on tibialis anterior (shin muscle) EMG and another pneumatic artificial muscle for plantar flexion based on soleus (calf muscle) EMG. This could result in a large degree of co-activation of the two actuators and make walking more difficult. To correct for this unwanted co-activation, a rule can be added to the control scheme so that artificial dorsiflexor activation is inhibited when soleus EMG is above a set threshold. Proportional control with flexor inhibition allows for a more natural gait than with direct proportional control; flexor inhibition also allows subjects to walk much more easily with combined knee and ankle exoskeletons with bi-directional actuators at each joint.

== Applications ==
=== Performance enhancement ===
Performance enhancement deals with increasing typical human capabilities, such as strength or endurance. Many full-body robotic exoskeletons currently in development use controllers based on joint torques and angles instead of electromyography. See Powered exoskeletons.

=== Long-term assistance ===
One application of a robot lower limb exoskeleton is to assist in the movement of a disabled individual in order to walk. Individuals with spinal cord injury, weakened leg muscles, poor neuromuscular control, or who have suffered a stroke could benefit from wearing such a device. The exoskeleton provides torque about a joint in the same direction that EMG data indicate the joint is rotating. For example, high EMG signals in the vastus medialis (a quadriceps muscle) and low EMG signals in the biceps femoris (a hamstring muscle) would indicate that the user is extending his/her leg, therefore the exoskeleton would provide torque on the knee to help straighten the leg.

=== Study of human locomotion ===
Proportional myoelectric control and robotic exoskeletons have been used in upper limb devices for decades, but engineers have only recently begun using them for lower-limb devices to better understand human biomechanics and neural control of locomotion. By using an exoskeleton with a proportional myoelectric controller, scientists can use a non-invasive means of studying the neural plasticity associated with modifying a muscle's force (biological +/- artificial force), as well as how motor memories for locomotor control are formed.

=== Rehabilitation ===
Robotic lower limb exoskeletons have the potential to help an individual recover from an injury such as a stroke, spinal cord injury, or other neurological disabilities. Neurological motor disorders often result in reduced volitional muscle activation amplitude, impaired proprioception, and disordered muscle coordination; a robotic exoskeleton with proportional myoelectric control can improve all three of these by amplifying the relationship between muscle activation and proprioceptive feedback. By increasing the consequences of muscle activation, an exoskeleton can improve sensory feedback in a physiological way, which in turn can improve motor control Individuals with spinal cord injury or who have had a stroke can improve their motor capabilities through intense gait rehabilitation, which can require up to three physical therapists to help partially support the body weight of the individual. Robotic lower limb exoskeletons could help in both of these areas.

== Physiological response ==
The neuromuscular system has targeted joint torques it tries to generate while walking. Assistive exoskeletons produce some of the torque needed to move one or more leg joints while walking, which allows a healthy individual to generate less muscle torque in those joints and use less metabolic energy. The muscle torque is reduced enough to keep the net torque about each joint approximately the same as when walking without an exoskeleton. The net torque about each joint is the muscular torque plus the actuator torque. Disabled individuals do not see much of a decrease, if any, in muscular torque while walking with an exoskeleton because their muscles are not strong enough to walk with a normal gait, or at all; the exoskeleton provides the remaining torque needed for them to walk.

== Examples ==
- Vanderbilt exoskeleton
- ReWalk
- HAL 5
- Ekso Bionics

== See also ==
- Orthotics
- Neural control of limb stiffness
- Powered exoskeleton
- Pneumatic Artificial Muscles
