= Berkeley Robotics and Human Engineering Laboratory =

Coordinates: 37°52′32″N 122°15′33″W

- Research type: Applied
- Field of research: Bioengineering and Robotics
- Location: Berkeley, California, United States
- Campus: Urban
- Operating agency: University of California, Berkeley
- Website: http://bleex.me.berkeley.edu

Berkeley Robotics and Human Engineering Laboratory is managed and operated by University of California, Berkeley. The lab conducts scientific research on the design and control of a class of robotic systems worn or operated by humans to increase human mechanical strength.

== Exoskeletons ==
=== Berkeley Lower Extremity Exoskeleton (Bleex) ===
External media

Images
- BleexImage 1
- Bleex Image 2

Video
- UC Berkeley Lower Extremity Exoskeleton (video 1) YouTube
- UC Berkeley Lower Extremity Exoskeleton (video 2)YouTube

The Berkeley Lower Extremity Exoskeleton, commonly abbreviated Bleex, is an intelligent, bionic exoskeleton system that provided soldiers, disaster relief workers, wildfire fighters, and other emergency personnel the ability to carry major loads.

=== ExoHiker ===
External videos
- Berkeley Bionics Human ExoskeletonExoHiker/ExoClimber, YouTube

ExoHiker was designed to help hikers carry heavy loads on their back, up to 150 pounds, over extended periods of time. Its design was completed by February 2005. The battery powered skeletal system is controlled with a handheld LCD. It can be strapped on to the body of hiker between 5 ft 4in and 6 ft 2in in height, like a wearable robot. The skeleton is easy to put on and take off. Altogether, the ExoHiker weighs 31 pounds, and is virtually noiseless. It can operate at an average speed of 2.5 mph for 42 miles with just one 80 Watt-hour lithium polymer battery weighing 1.2 pounds. With a small solar panel, its "mission time" can be unlimited.

=== Ekso/eLegs ===
External media

Images
- eLegs during an evaluation

Video
- Berkeley Bionics: IntroducingeLEGSYouTube
- Paralyzed student, Austin Whitney, walks at graduation YouTube

In 2010 The lab unveiled eLEGS, which stands for "Exoskeleton Lower Extremity Gait System." eLEGS is another hydraulically powered exoskeleton system, and allows paraplegics to stand and walk with crutches or a walker. The computer interface uses force and motion sensors to monitor the user's gestures and motion, and uses this information to intelligently interpret the intent of the user and translate it into appropriate action. Users can "put on and take off the device by themselves as well as walk, turn, sit down, and stand up unaided".

In 2011 eLEGS was renamed Ekso. Ekso weighs 45 pounds (20 kg), has a maximum speed of 2 mph (3.2 km/h) and a battery life of 6 hours. It is suitable for users weighing up to 220 pounds, who are between 5 ft 2in and 6 ft 4in tall and can transfer themselves from a wheelchair to a chair. It allows the user to "walk in a straight line, stand from a sitting position, stand for an extended period of time, and sit down from a standing position".

Ekso is currently undergoing further development and clinical trials in rehabilitation centers. It should become lighter and more adaptable, and by 2013 should be available for private use at a cost of about $100,000.

=== ExoClimber ===
ExoClimber is an enhancement of ExoHiker that allows the wearer to ascend stairs and climb steep slopes. It weighs 50 pounds, and for each pound of lithium polymer battery, can assist a climber to ascend 600 feet vertically with a 150-pound load.

=== Human Universal Load Carrier ===
External media

Images
- HULC

Video
- Human Universal Load Carrier(HULC)YouTube
- Make Me Superhuman Part 1 of 3 National Geographic

In 2009 the laboratory/Berkeley Bionics unveiled HULC, which stands for Human Universal Load Carrier.HULC is a more sophisticated and capable development of the above projects. It can carry a 200-pound load, and reduces the metabolic energy needed by the wearer to perform a given task. "In this way the device can significantly increase the range and length of tasks the wearer can perform."

In particular, HULC has potential military uses, and in 2009 a licensing and development agreement was reached with Lockheed Martin.

HULC lends itself to augmentation with devices that can be mounted on the back of its exoskeleton. One such device, the Lift Assist Device, lets operators carry front loads as well as loads on their back. It also "allows single operators to safely lift heavy loads that currently require two or more people". Austin project named after in honor of its first human test subject Austin Whitney, a University of California, Berkeley graduate, is a series of technologies that lead to low cost exoskeleton systems for individuals with mobility disorders.

=== Hydraulic Human Power Extender ===
External videos
- Hydraulic-powered robotic arm showing human interface gripper YouTube
- Hydraulic-powered robotic arm showing human interface gripper (ver2) YouTube

Developed by the laboratory Hydraulic Human Power Extender is a tool with a carrying capacity of 500 pounds, intended to help loading and unloading aircraft. Two sets of piezoelectric force sensors measure forces for arbitrary force augmentation and force reflection in the machine while the six axes of this extender are controlled by three on-board microcomputers.

== See also ==
- Berkeley Lower Extremity Exoskeleton
- Ekso Bionics
- Human Universal Load Carrier
- Lawrence Berkeley National Laboratory
- UC Berkeley College of Engineering
