= Cyberdyne =

Cyberdyne may refer to:

- Cyberdyne Inc., a Japanese company which sells a powered exoskeleton called HAL 5 (Hybrid Assistive Limb)
- Cyberdyne (Cyber Dynamics Systems Corporation), a fictional corporation that created the Skynet system in the Terminator franchise
- Cyberdyne, the name of a fictional manufacturer in the anime Hand Maid May

== See also ==
- Cyberdyne Ibaraki Robots, a Japanese professional basketball team
- Norton Cyberdyne from the 1990 B horror/science fiction film Syngenor
