= Homayoon Kazerooni =

Iranian-born American roboticist

- همایون کازرونی
- Born: Tehran, Iran
- Other name: Homayun Kazeruni
- Education: Massachusetts Institute of Technology; University of Wisconsin–Madison
- Known for: BLEEX; HULC
- Scientific career
- Fields: Robotics; Control theory Mechatronics
- Workplaces: University of California, Berkeley

Homayoon Kazerooni (Persian: همایون کازرونی, romanized: Homâyun Kâzeruni, [hʊmɒːˈjuːn kʰɒːzeɾuːˈniː]) is an Iranian-born American roboticist, mechanical engineer, and professor. He serves as a professor of mechanical engineering, and the director of the Berkeley Robotics and Human Engineering Laboratory (KAZ LAB) at the University of California, Berkeley (U.C. Berkeley). Kazerooni is also the co-founder of Ekso Bionics and SuitX.

== Early life and education ==
Homayoon Kazerooni was born in Tehran, Iran. Kazerooni emigrated to the United States in the late 1970s, around the time of the Iranian Revolution.

He has a MS degree and ME degree (1980) from University of Wisconsin–Madison. Kazerooni has a MS degree (1982); and he holds a Ph.D. (1985) in mechanical engineering from Massachusetts Institute of Technology (MIT), with a focus on Human-Machine Systems.

Early in his career, Kazerooni was a recipient of the outstanding American Society of Mechanical Engineers (ASME) Investigator Award.

== Career ==
Kazerooni's work focuses on the control of human-machine systems specific to lower human extremities.

Early in his career Kazerooni led his team to successfully develop robotics systems that enhance human upper extremity strength. The results of this work led to a new class of intelligent assist devices currently being used by workers worldwide for manipulating heavy objects in distribution centers and factories. Kazerooni has also been conducting research on human performance in coordinated haptic-visual virtual environments under several contracts from NASA. Other research interests are biomimetic design, haptics, non-linear control systems, embedded systems, networked control systems, power regeneration, monopropellant and portable energy generation methods for mobile platforms.

In 2011, the Berkeley Robotics and Human Engineering Laboratory enabled Austin Whitney, a paraplegic student at the University of California, Berkeley, to walk for commencement. Kazerooni started a project to develop low-cost exoskeleton systems to enable independence for individuals with gait deficiencies called the Austin Project; named after the first pilot for their medical exoskeleton.

He has served in a variety of leadership roles in the robotics community notably editor of two journals: ASME Journal of Dynamics Systems and Control and IEEE Transactions on Mechatronics.

=== Ekso Bionics and SuitX ===
Ekso Bionics and SuitX exist as company spinoffs from the research at Berkeley Robotics and Human Engineering Laboratory.

Ekso Bionics (formerly known as Berkeley ExoWorks, and later Berkeley Bionics) was founded in 2005, and Kazerooni was a co-founder alongside Russ Angold, and Nathan Harding. Ekso Bionics produced exoskeletons specifically for work assistance, one of the early products was eLegs. After developing BLEEX, ExoHiker, and ExoClimber – three super-light, load-carrying exoskeletons, Ekso Bionics and his team created HULC (Human Universal Load Carrier). It is the first energetically autonomous, orthotic, lower extremity exoskeleton, providing the ability for its user to carry 200-pound weights over any sort of terrain for an extended period of time without undue effort. These exoskeletons reduce the possibility of the wearer becoming fatigued and reaching their physiological endurance limit during critical military or industrial missions. HULC technology is currently licensed to Lockheed Martin for military applications. In 2014, Ekso Bionics went public.

Kazerooni worked on extending his technology to aid persons who have experienced a stroke, spinal cord injuries or medical conditions that obligate them to use a wheelchair, which inspired the formation of SuitX (formerly U.S. Bionics). SuitX was founded by Kazerooni and headquartered in Emeryville, California. SuitX produces exoskeletons for healthcare, including aid for neurological and mobility disorders. In November 2021, SuitX was acquired by German medical prosthetics maker Ottobock. Kazerooni's SuitX work, PhoeniX Exoskeleton, was featured in the traveling art exhibition, Designs for Different Futures (2020) at the Philadelphia Museum of Art, the Art Institute of Chicago, and the Walker Art Center.

== Criticisms ==
Critics of the Kazerooni designed exoskeletons have pointed out the high cost of the devices, alongside a narrow criteria for disability use. These exoskeleton devices have offered few scientifically proven health effects, and their research has been partially funded by the United States Armed Forces. Additionally exoskeletons are not covered by health insurance in the United States, making them significantly more expensive than a wheelchair.

== Patents ==
- Human power amplifier for lifting load with slack prevention apparatus
- Device and Method for Wireless Lifting Assist Devices
- Pneumatic human power amplifier module
- Mechanical grapple for grabbing and holding sacks and bags
