= Claire Lomas =

British charity campaigner (1980–2024)

Claire Lomas MBE
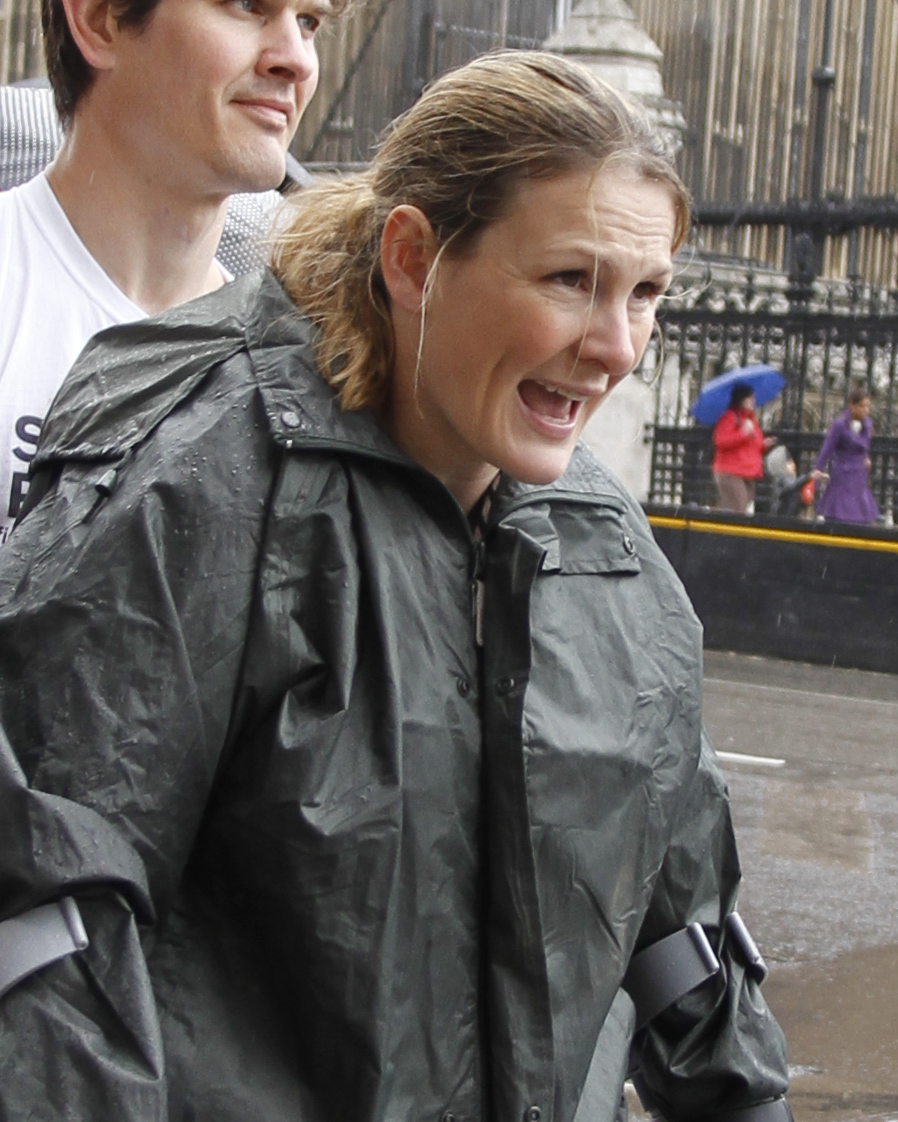
- Lomas walking the 2012 Virgin London Marathon
- Born: 21 March 1980; Leicestershire, United Kingdom
- Died: 22 August 2024 (aged 44); Jordan
- Occupations: Event rider, Fundraiser, Mono skier Motivational Speaker. Author. Pilot Motorcyclist
- Known for: First to finish The Virgin London Marathon using robotic walking aid taking 17 days and continuing to fundraise for charities.
- Spouse: Dan Spincer
- Children: Maisie and Chloe
- Website: Official website

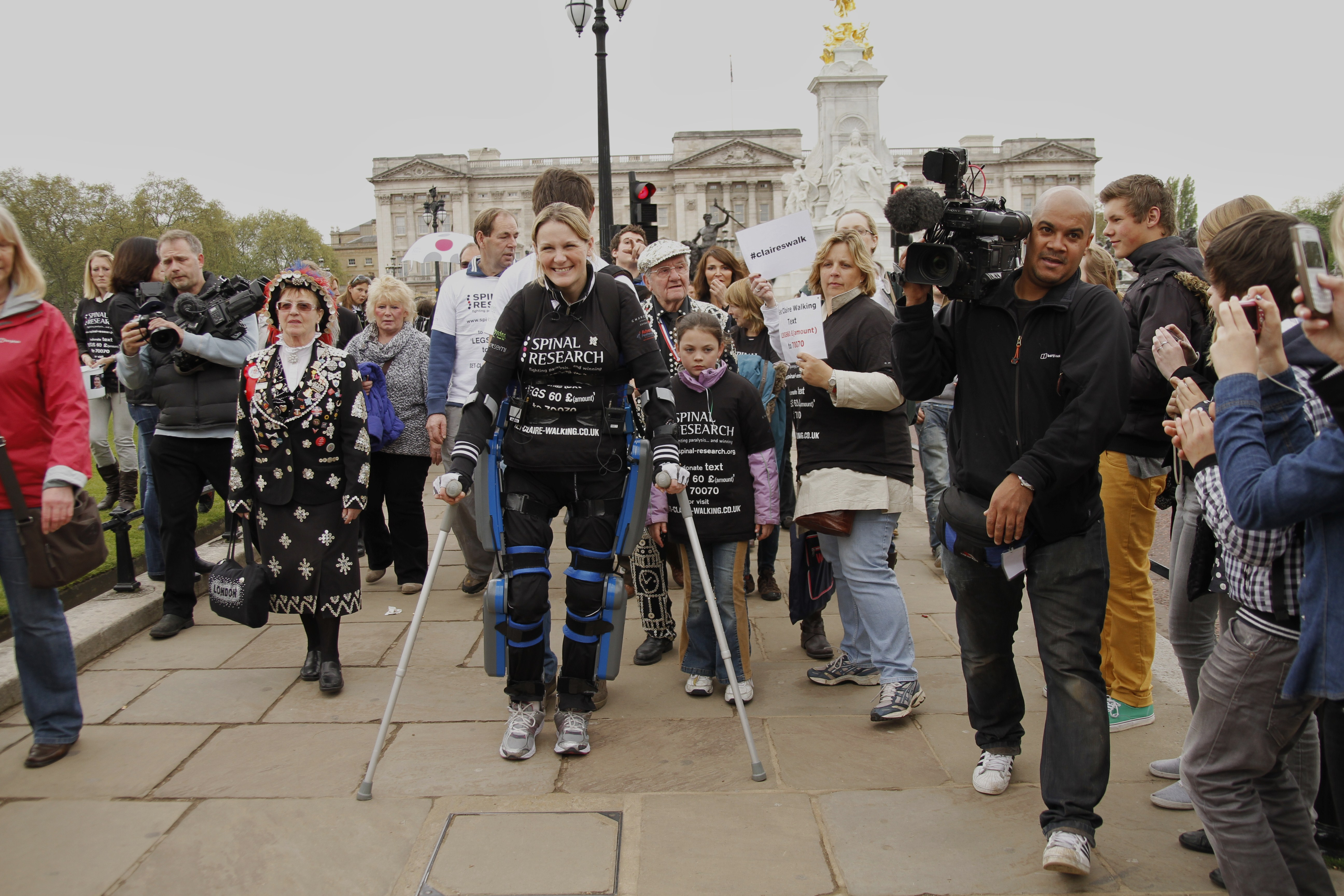
Claire Lomas supported by spectators during her 2012 Virgin London Marathon walk

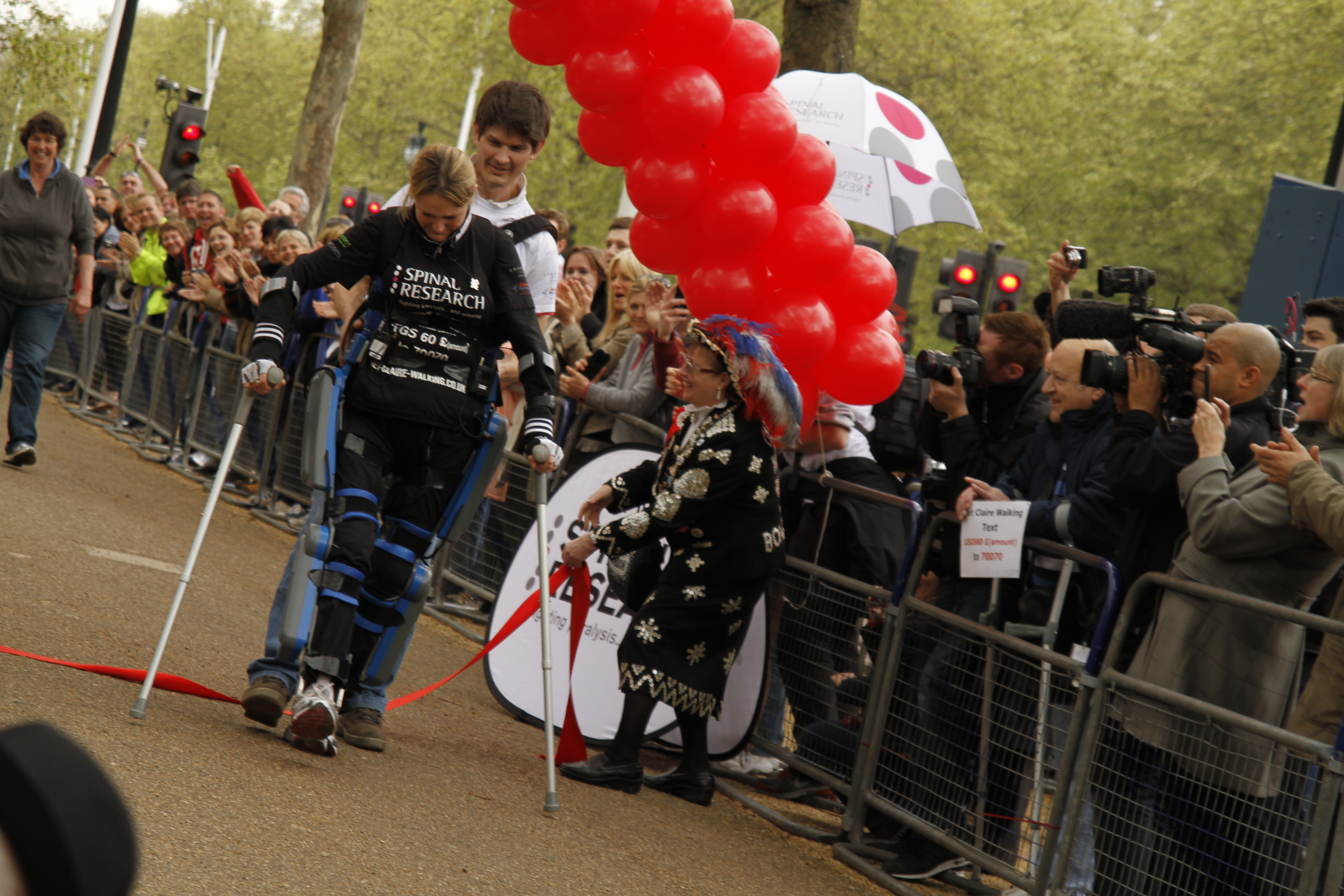
Claire Lomas crossing the finish line

Claire Lomas MBE (21 March 1980 – 22 August 2024) was a British campaigner, fundraiser, motivational speaker, and former event rider and chiropractor. She became a paraplegic as a result of a horse riding accident in 2007. In 2012, she finished the 32nd Virgin London Marathon in 17 days using the ReWalk robotic suit. Her death following an accident in Jordan was announced on 30 August 2024. This was later confirmed as a microlight accident.

== Background ==
Before 2007, Lomas worked as an event rider, producing and competing horses in Eye Kettleby, near Melton Mowbray in Leicestershire, United Kingdom. She also worked as a chiropractor. She competed at Advanced level in British Eventing. While competing at Osberton Horse Trials in Nottinghamshire in May 2007 she had an accident, colliding with a tree, which resulted in broken ribs puncturing her lungs and causing pneumonia; multiple fractures on her neck; and a spinal cord injury causing paralysis from the chest down. After a speedy recovery at the Sheffield Northern General Hospital's Spinal Injuries Unit, due to the spinal cord injury on T4 thoracic vertebrae Lomas was left without the use of her legs and lack of general sensation in lower part of her body.

Despite the injuries that left her with paraplegia, her condition improved rapidly due to medical rehabilitation treatments and being active in sports (gym exercising, horse riding, skiing and swimming). Lomas also credited the high level of support and understanding she received from her husband Dan and becoming a mother as she gave birth to her daughter Maisie in February 2011.

This progress and support stimulated Lomas not to become depressed but instead to run various campaigns and fundraising events publicly during 2008–2012 to acquire equipment for her rehabilitation and raise funds for research into spinal cord repair for the British charity Spinal Research, for which Lomas was an Ambassador for their Saddle Up Campaign for horse riders.

After intensive and continuous rehabilitative exercising and therapy, Lomas reported she gained improvements in core strength. However, her lower body motoric abilities were still impaired and she had to use a wheelchair to stay mobile in everyday life.

== Achievements ==
Lomas ran a fundraising campaign to raise £50,000 for the charity Spinal Research to find a repair for spinal cord injury. This campaign promoted as Claire's Walk focuses around her participation in the 32nd Virgin London Marathon of 22 April 2012. She finished the Marathon in 17 days using the ReWalk robotic suit that helps people with paraplegia walk standing in upright position, on 8 May.

In August 2011, Lomas announced launching a semi-nude photography calendar starring renowned event riders from Britain as a method of fundraising for purchasing the £43,000 ReWalk suit. The calendar was published on 1 September 2011 and £10,000 of the total sum needed was donated by the Matt Hampson Foundation. She began training on 23 January 2012.

Though the organisation requires participants to finish the marathon within 24 hours, they allowed Lomas to walk 2 miles a day for 17 days accompanied by her husband. She finished the marathon after 17 days, passing the finish line on 8 May 2012 at 12:50. Donations for Spinal Research were gathered mostly online through the Just Giving UK website and reached £90,000 as she crossed the finish line, up to £143,000 five days later.

== Awards and recognition ==
After completing the 2012 London Marathon Lomas received 14 medals from other marathon participants as symbolic recognition of her accomplishment. Her crossing the finish line at The Mall in central London was escorted by three mounted members of the Household Cavalry giving Lomas a guard of honour and she was awarded the Virgin Trophy by Holly Branson.

Lomas went on to be nominated for and to win the title of Inspirational Fundraiser at the Inspiration Awards for Women in October 2012 as well as the Helen Rollason Award for Inspiration at The Sunday Times Sportswomen of the Year Awards in November 2012. She was appointed a Member of the Order of the British Empire (MBE) in the 2017 New Year Honours for charitable and voluntary services to Spinal Injury Research.

== Post-marathon ==
Lomas was given the honour of lighting the Paralympic Cauldron in Trafalgar Square on 24 August 2012 in front of Prime Minister David Cameron, Mayor of London Boris Johnson and Lord Sebastian Coe, Chairman of the London Organising Committee for the Olympic Games. She lit the cauldron in the robotic suit. She also started the Leicester Marathon in 2012 but did not attempt the entire distance.

== New challenges ==
Lomas took on a 400-mile cycle challenge in the UK in April and May 2013 in which she cycled from Nottingham to London using a handbike.

== Media career ==
Lomas made many media appearances and presented a number of television programmes.

== Personal life and death ==
Lomas was born on 21 March 1980 in Leicestershire, England. She went to Stamford High School in Lincolnshire.

She was married to Dan Spincer, and the couple had two daughters: Maisie and Chloe. As of 2024 they lived at Eye Kettleby in Melton Mowbray, Leicestershire.

Lomas died following an aviation accident in Jordan on the morning of 22 August 2024. She was 44. Her death was announced on 30 August. On 15 July 2024 the adapted microlight she was flying veered off a road after landing and crashed into a rock. She was taken to the King Hussein Medical Centre where she died on the morning of 22 August 2024. An inquest on the accident began at County Hall, Glenfield in August 2026.
