= Ekso Bionics =

American exoskeleton manufacturer

Ekso Bionics Holdings Inc.
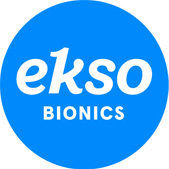
- Type: Public
- Traded as: Nasdaq: EKSO; Russell Microcap Index component
- Founded: 2005; 21 years ago
- Founder: Homayoon Kazerooni, Russ Angold, Nathan Harding
- Headquarters: San Rafael, California, United States
- Key people: Scott Davis (CEO); Jerome Wong (CFO); Jason Jones (COO)
- Website: eksobionics.com

Ekso Bionics Holdings Inc. is a company that develops and manufactures powered exoskeleton bionic devices that can be strapped on as wearable robots to enhance the strength, mobility, and endurance of industrial workers and people experiencing paralysis and mobility issues after a brain injury, stroke, multiple sclerosis (MS) or spinal cord injury. They enable individuals with any amount of lower extremity weakness, including those who are paralyzed, to stand up and walk.

Ekso Bionics currently focuses in the health and industrial sectors.

The company's first commercially available health product was called EksoGT (formerly eLEGS). Ekso Bionics is the original developer of HULC, now under military development by Lockheed Martin, and the current developers of EksoNR, which allows patients who are relearning to walk the ability to stand and take steps. In December 2022, Ekso Bionics acquired the Human Motion & Control business unit from Parker Hannifin which includes the Indego product line. This acquisition allowed Ekso Bionics to begin selling exoskeletons to those who have an SCI and want a personal exoskeleton to walk at home and in their community. This personal exoskeleton is available to eligible Medicare beneficiaries for reimbursement starting in April 2024.

Ekso was selected as Wired magazine's number two "Most Significant Gadget of 2010", and was included in Time magazine's "50 Best Innovations of 2010". Ekso Bionics was also featured in Inc. magazine as one of "5 Big Ideas for the Next 15 Years".

== Background ==
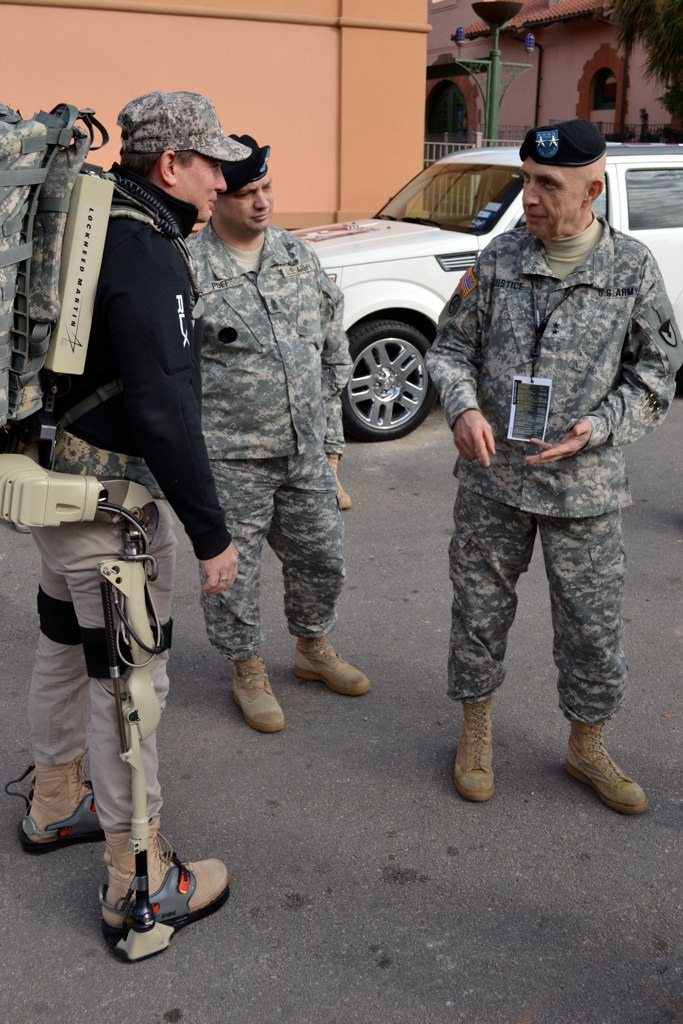
Human Universal Load Carrier

The company was founded in 2005 under the name of Berkeley ExoWorks by Homayoon Kazerooni, Russ Angold and Nathan Harding, all members of the Berkeley Robotics and Human Engineering Laboratory at the University of California. Berkeley ExoWorks introduced ExoHiker and ExoClimber, both with a weight carrying capacity of 150 pounds.

In 2007 the company changed its name from Berkeley ExoWorks to Berkeley Bionics. Berkeley Bionics developed an untethered, hydraulically powered exoskeleton they called the Human Universal Load Carrier (HULC), and which could carry heavier loads than the previous models. The HULC system was announced publicly at the AUSA Winter Symposium on February 26, 2009, when an exclusive licensing agreement was reached with Lockheed Martin. Berkeley Bionics also debuted eLEGS, an intelligent, bionic exoskeleton that allows wheelchair users to stand and walk.

In 2011 Berkeley Bionics changed its name again, to its current name Ekso Bionics. It also changed the name of eLegs to Ekso.

In 2012, Ekso suits were registered as a class l device for hospital use in the US, and received a CE marking from the E.U.

In 2013, Ekso Bionics added Variable Assist, an intelligent and adaptive software providing the ability to provide adaptive amounts of power to either side of the body, making them unique in the field of medical exoskeletons.

In 2014, Ekso Bionics became a public company.

In 2015, Ekso Bionics began to develop new market with industrial prototype. Continued to expand into leading rehabilitation hospitals.

In 2016, Ekso Bionics appointed Thomas Looby interim chief executive officer, continues commercialization drive.

Also in 2016, Ekso Bionics was awarded FDA clearance for use with stroke and SCI patients.

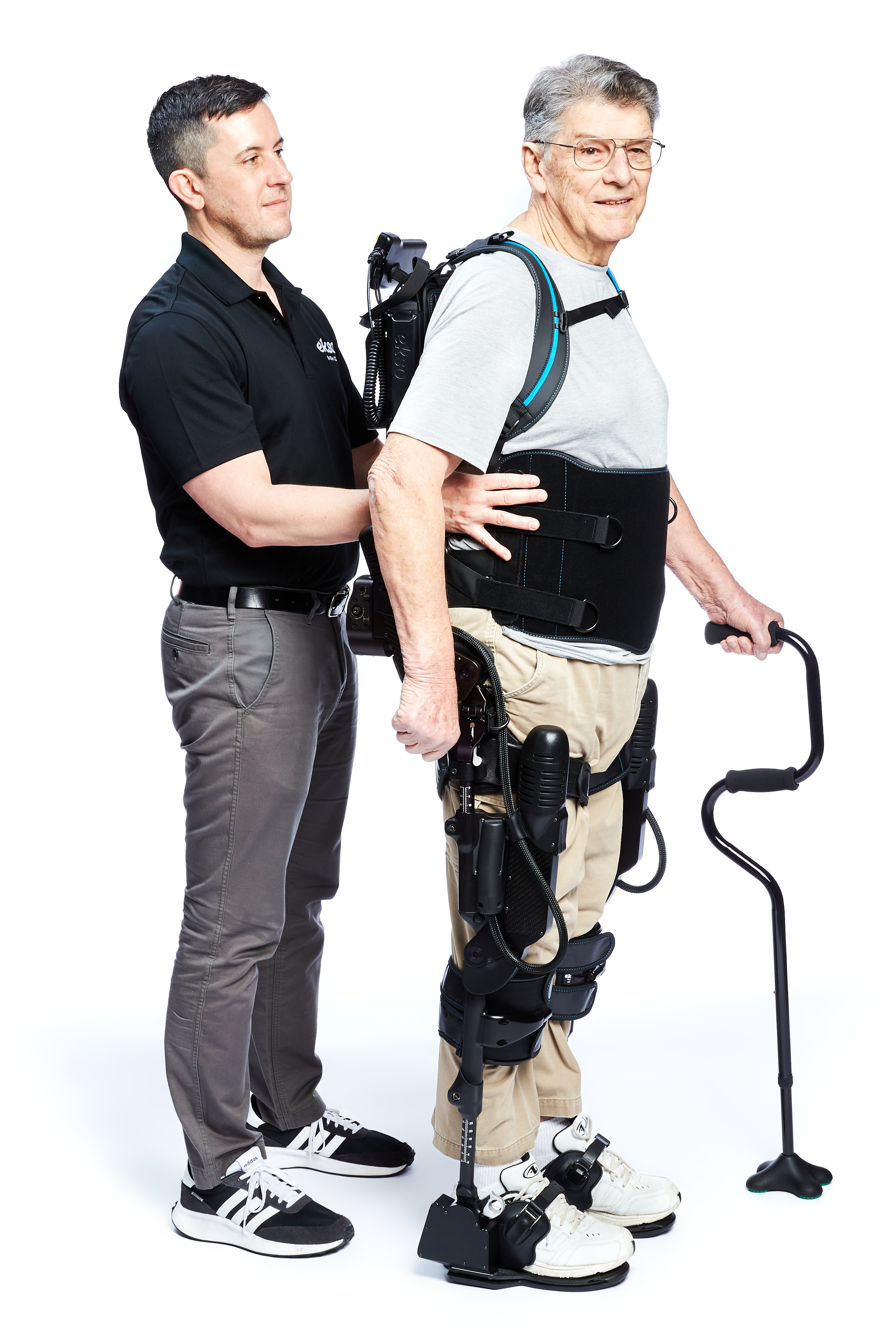
EksoNR

In 2017, Ekso Bionics added SmartAssist software to the EksoGT, adding a pregait suite and ability to walk free of the programmed Ekso step.

In 2019, Ekso Bionics launched EksoNR, the next iteration of the predicate device, EksoGT.

In 2020, EksoNR was awarded FDA clearance for use with acquired brain injury, the first in the market.

Also in 2020, Ekso EVO was launched, which was the next generation of the upper body industrial exoskeleton, EksoVest.

in 2021, EksoNR was awarded FDA clearance for use with multiple sclerosis, the first in the market.

In December 2022, Ekso Bionics acquired the Human Motion & Control business unit from Parker Hannifin which includes the Indego exoskeleton product line - Indego Therapy & Indego Personal.

== Past Products ==
=== HULC ===
External videos
- Human Universal Load Carrier (HULC) YouTube
- Make Me Superhuman Part 1 of 3 National Geographic

In 2009 Berkeley Bionics unveiled HULC, which stands for Human Universal Load Carrier. HULC is a more sophisticated and capable development of other projects including BLEEX. It can carry a 200-pound load, and reduces the metabolic energy needed by the wearer to perform a given task. "In this way the device can significantly increase the range and length of tasks the wearer can perform."

In particular, HULC has potential military uses, and in 2009 a licensing and development agreement was reached with Lockheed Martin.

HULC lends itself to augmentation with devices that can be mounted on the back of its exoskeleton. One such device, the Lift Assist Device, lets operators carry front loads as well as loads on their back. It also "allows single operators to lift heavy loads that currently require two or more people".

=== Zero-G ===
In 2015, Ekso Bionics acquired the ZeroG from Equipois LLC. This zero gravity tool arm is able to hold heavy tools atop aerial work platforms, scissor lifts. and scaffolding. It is a spring-loaded robotic arm that is able to transfer the weight of heavy tools to its base, then into the ground. The unit has the ability to be mounted in less than one minute, making large jobs much easier and faster. It can also decrease injury and increase production.

== Current Products - Ekso Health ==
The company now produced a range of products involved in rehabilitation (sometimes ExoRehabilitation) and assistive technologies.

=== EksoNR (formerly eLEGS, EksoGT) ===
External media

Images
- eLegs during an evaluation

Video
- Berkeley Bionics: Introducing eLEGS YouTube
- Paralyzed student, Austin Whitney, walks at graduation YouTube
- https://www.youtube.com/watch?v=YcJLtvki7hk&t=1s
- https://www.youtube.com/watch?v=VXsvLNxd9WA&t=1s

In 2010 Berkeley Bionics unveiled eLEGS, which stands for "Exoskeleton Lower Extremity Gait System". eLEGS is another pneumatically powered exoskeleton system, and allows paraplegics to stand and walk with crutches or a walker. The computer interface uses force and motion sensors to monitor the user's gestures and motion, and uses this information to interpret the intent of the user and translate it into action. Users can "put on and take off the device by themselves as well as walk, turn, sit down, and stand up unaided".

In 2011 eLEGS was renamed Ekso. Ekso weighs 45 pounds (20 kg), has a maximum speed of 2 mph (3.2 km/h) and a battery life of 2-4 hours. It is suitable for users weighing up to 220 pounds, who are between 5 ft and 6 ft 4in tall. It is donned while sitting in a chair, so users must be able to transfer with or without assistance to the chair. It allows the user to "walk in a straight line, stand from a sitting position, stand for an extended period of time, and sit down from a standing position".

In 2013 The next generation Ekso GT with Variable Assist (marketed as SmartAssist outside the U.S.) software was released. It is the only exoskeleton available for rehabilitation institutions that can provide adaptive amounts of power to either side of the patient's body, challenging the patient as they progress through their continuum of care. It also added the ability to turn around. The suit's patented technology provides the ability to mobilize patients earlier, more frequently and with a greater number of high intensity steps.

April 1, 2016 the FDA cleared the EksoGT to be used with stroke patients and spinal cord injury patients up to level C7 (ASIA D classification). This was the first exoskeleton cleared for rehabilitative use for the stroke population.

In 2017 Ekso Bionics released SmartAssist software in the US which is an upgrade to the Variable Assist software. SmartAssist allows for pre-gait activities in addition to gait training. It also added the ability to walk outside of the Ekso step trajectory, allowing for quick assessment of patient carryover while still in the device. The software upgrade also included updates for ease of use and to keep track of each patient's settings via a specific patient ID number. Ekso Bionics also launched Ekso Pulse which is a way to metrically track a patient's progression over the course of their rehab treatment via an online portal at the Ekso Bionics website.

In August 2019 Ekso Bionics released EksoNR (NeuroRehabilitation) to replace EksoGT. The biggest change was the introduction of the new EksoView touchscreen controller and the associated upgrades to software. EksoNR allows patients across the continuum of care to work on pre-gait activities (weight shifting, marching, squats, side tapping), various modes of walking, and advanced gait activities such as walking backwards, side-stepping, walking with no trajectory, and walking with added resistance.

In June 2020, Ekso Bionics received FDA approval to use EksoNR on patients with acquired brain injury, including traumatic brain injury. EksoNR was the first and is the only exoskeleton cleared for this patient population.

In June 2021, Ekso Bionics received FDA approval to use EksoNR with patients diagnosed with multiple sclerosis (MS), the first and only exoskeleton with this indication for use.

In January 2024, Ekso Bionics launched its new software, GaitCoach, which provides more guidance to therapists. Additional feedback and focusing on specific areas of gait that need improvement were added.

=== Ekso Indego Therapy (formerly Vanderbilt Exoskeleton) ===
Prototyped in 2010 as the Vanderbilt exoskeleton, this powered exoskeleton was designed by the Center for

External videos
- https://www.youtube.com/watch?v=s8mNP2cdbiE
- https://www.youtube.com/watch?v=8TX2Xnqsbhs

Intelligent Mechatronics at Vanderbilt University to assist adults with any type of paralysis to walk independently. It relies on patient leg positioning to guide what the exoskeleton should do. It follows a lean forward to walk model.

In October 2012, Parker Hannifin signed an exclusive licensing agreement with Vanderbilt University for the right to develop and manufacture a commercial version of the exoskeleton, which it planned to release under the name Indego.

The Indego is able to complete a sit to stand, walk, and stand to sit. It is meant to be used under the guide of a skilled, certified clinician. Initially it included a software suite called Motion+, intended to assist those who are unable to ambulate to walk.

At the time of launch, the product was sold as a 3-piece kit, providing small, medium, and large sizes of each of the 5 pieces that make up the Indego (hip, 2x upper leg, 2x lower leg)

Patients who utilize the Indego need to be less than 250lbs (113.4 kg) and have a seated hip width of 16.5” (42.2 cm) or less.

In 2016, the Indego was FDA approved for individuals with spinal cord injury at levels T4 to L5 to perform ambulatory functions in rehabilitation institutions.

In 2017, the indications for Indego were expanded by the FDA to include those with spinal cord injuries from C7-L5.

In 2018, the FDA expanded the indications of Indego to include individuals with hemiplegia due to stroke.

Also in 2018, the adjustable Indego Therapy device was launched. The adjustable device includes 5 pieces that assemble into the full exoskeleton: an adjustable hip, two adjustable upper legs, and three different sizes of adjustable lower legs. The pieces are easy to connect resulting in the patient being able to don and doff the device independently. This offering also expanded the software options to include the Therapy+ software suite, intended for patients who are walking with minimal assistance or less to help fine tune their walking.

=== Ekso Indego Personal ===
The Ekso Indego Personal is intended to assist those with paraplegia to ambulate in their home and

External videos
- https://www.youtube.com/watch?v=RMWeUFt5n2E
- https://www.youtube.com/watch?v=lnV5EL1UzXM&t=2s

community. It is meant to be used with a support person who goes through training to use the device with the user.

The modular design is consistent with the therapy device, however, the Indego personal hip and upper legs are not adjustable. The user receives one of three sizes for each piece of the Indego, creating a custom fit.

Indego Personal functions on the Motion+ software suite that allows a user to sit to stand, walk, and return to sitting. It can be worn in the passenger seat in the car and it can be donned in most wheelchairs. It includes LED lights that tell the support person and user what state the Indego is in. It is very intuitive to use, with most users standing and walking their first time in the device.

In 2016 the FDA approved personal use for T7 to L5.

In 2018, the personal device indications were expanded up to the level of T3 by the FDA.

Also in 2018, an updated memorandum was issued by the United States Department of Veterans Affairs that provides qualified veterans with a powered exoskeleton for personal use free of cost.

In December 2023, the Pricing, Data Analysis, and Coding (“PDAC”) contractor for the Centers for Medicare & Medicaid Services (“CMS”) completed its review of the Ekso Indego Personal and approved use of Healthcare Common Procedure Coding System (“HCPCS”) Code K1007 to bill Medicare for such device.

In April 2024, PDAC determined a final payment level for Medicare reimbursement of the Ekso Indego Personal.

In August 2024, Ekso Bionics announced receipt of its initial CMS reimbursement for the Ekso Indego Personal.

=== EksoUE ===
Developed with Johns Hopkins University, EksoUE is a spin off from the EksoVest to be used in the healthcare setting under qualified therapists. It is a passive, non-robotic system that provides spring powered assistance at the shoulders to amplify the users movements. It has tool-less adjustability and is non-tethered, allowing users to walk around to different environments with it donned, separating it from its larger and static competitors like the Tyromotion Diego. It is registered as a class I medical device under the FDA.

In 2019, the EksoUE was announced.

In 2020, the EksoUE was initially launched to targeted customers.

== Current Products - Ekso Works ==
=== Ekso EVO (formerly EksoVest) ===
In 2018, EksoVest was officially launched. This was an industrial upper-body exoskeleton developed to

External videos
- https://www.youtube.com/watch?v=2FcrtwgoYf4
- https://www.youtube.com/watch?v=HpYhY5-cVyk

support a worker’s arms and shoulders to assist with overhead work. EksoVest provided support for tasks at chest height or overhead and was spring-powered, without the need for batteries or charging. Using EksoVest allowed industrial leaders to reduce workplace injuries and bolster productivity.

In 2019, the EksoVest became available in Northern Europe.

In 2020, Ekso launched the new version of the EksoVest called the Ekso EVO. Using feedback from the EksoVest, the Ekso Evo was modified to be more comfortable, lower in price, and retain less heat. It continues to be spring loaded, allowing arm support for overhead activities. A new stacked link, sleek design minimizes body contact while still performing to the highest level to reduce fatigue and user injury in the workplace.

== See also ==
- Cyberdyne
- Rehabilitation robotics
- ReWalk
- Hybrid Assistive Limb

== Other references ==
- Robotic devices help paralyzed become more independent USA Today, 6 January 2012.
- Meet the Real Bionic Man Wall Street Journal, 22 October 2011.
- Walking Again, With Help From an Exoskeleton The New York Times, 3 November 2011.
- US researchers create suit that can enable paraplegics to walk Archived 2012-05-05 at the Wayback Machine The Engineer, 25 October 2011.
- Johnson, Carolyn Y. With device’s aid, the paralyzed take steps anew The Boston Globe, 15 September 2011.
- Wearable robot puts paralysed legs through their paces" Wired UK, 17 January 2012.
- Strickland, Eliza (2012) "Good-bye, Wheelchair, Hello Exoskeleton" IEEE Spectrum, 49 (1): 30–32.
