= Amit Goffer =

Israeli inventor and entrepreneur

- עמית גופר
- Education: Technion-Israel Institute of Technology, Tel-Aviv University, Drexel University
- Occupations: Inventor, businessperson
- Known for: Inventing ReWalk soft exoskeleton
- Title: CTO and president of UPnRIDE Robotics Ltd.

Amit Goffer (Hebrew: עמית גופר) was an inventor and serial entrepreneur and is regarded as one of the pioneers of the exoskeleton industry.

He is the chief technology officer and president of UPnRIDE Robotics Ltd. He received his B.Sc. from Technion-Israel Institute of Technology, his M.Sc. from Tel-Aviv University and his Ph.D. from Drexel University in electrical and computer engineering where his advisor was Moshe Kam. He was the founder of Odin Medical which provides MRIs in real time. From 2001 to 2012 he was CEO, and then from 2012 to 2015 the President and CTO of the company he founded, ReWalk. Unable to walk after an accident, he created the ReWalk system which is the first commercially available exoskeleton in the US. There are approximately 400 users as of 2019 including US military veterans. Goffer was awarded an honorary doctorate from Drexel University in 2004.
