= UC Berkeley College of Engineering =

Engineering school of the University of California, Berkeley

University of California, Berkeley College of Engineering
- Type: Public engineering school
- Established: 1931; 95 years ago
- Parent institution: University of California, Berkeley
- Dean: Mark Asta (interim)
- Faculty: 249 (2022)
- Undergraduates: 4041 (2022)
- Postgraduates: 2,790 (2022)
- Location: Berkeley, California, United States; 37°52′25.78″N 122°15′32.57″W
- Website: engineering.berkeley.edu

The University of California, Berkeley College of Engineering (branded as Berkeley Engineering) is the engineering school of the University of California, Berkeley (a land-grant research university in Berkeley, California). Established in 1931, it occupies fourteen buildings on the northeast side of the main campus and also operates the 150-acre (61-hectare) Richmond Field Station. It is also considered highly selective and is consistently ranked among the top engineering schools in both the nation and the world.

== Academics ==
The College of Letters and Science (L&S) offers a Bachelor of Arts in Computer Science, which requires many of the same courses as the College of Engineering's Bachelor of Science in Electrical Engineering and Computer Sciences (EECS) but has different admissions and graduation criteria. It is one of the university's most selective undergraduate programs, along with the College of Engineering's EECS program; acceptance rates have been at or below 5% for both freshman and transfer applicants in recent years—5.2% for Fall 2020 EECS freshman applicants, which was lower than the MIT acceptance rate. Berkeley's chemical and biomolecular engineering departments are under the College of Chemistry.

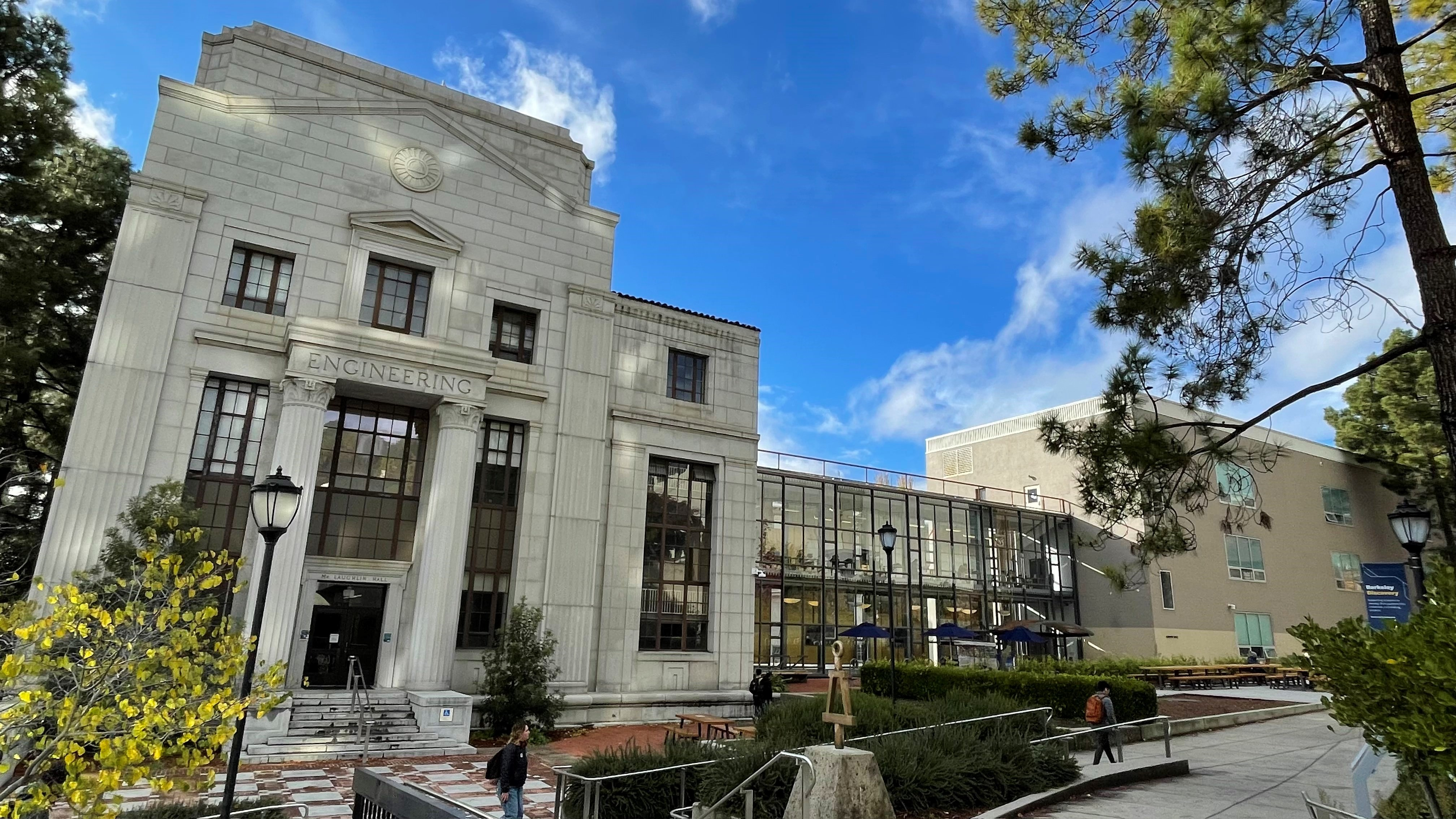
McLaughlin Hall, the college's administration building

=== Departments ===
- Aerospace Engineering (AE)
- Bioengineering (BioE)
- Civil and Environmental Engineering (CEE)
- Development Engineering (DevEng)
- Electrical and Computer Engineering (ECE)
- Electrical Engineering and Computer Sciences (EECS)
- Engineering Science (ES)
  - Energy Engineering (EE)
  - Engineering Mathematics and Statistics (EMS)
  - Engineering Physics (EP)
  - Environmental Engineering Science (EES)
- Industrial Engineering and Operations Research (IEOR)
- Materials Science and Engineering (MSE)
- Mechanical Engineering (ME)
- Nuclear Engineering (NE)

== Students ==
There are approximately 4,100 undergraduates in the College of Engineering, which for the 2021/22 application cycle had an acceptance rate of 7.6%, while Berkeley as a whole had a 14% acceptance rate. The Management, Entrepreneurship & Technology (M.E.T.) program, a dual-degree track offered in collaboration with the Haas School of Business, is even more selective, with an acceptance rate of less than 3%. Applicants to the college may apply directly to one of the departments and enter with a declared major or may apply as an undeclared matriculant; major declaration is required at the end of sophomore year. Once within the college, it is possible to change majors with the approval of Engineering Student Services but it is difficult for undergraduates in other colleges at Berkeley to transfer into Engineering. The college accepts transfer applications, although only 9% of the over 2,300 junior transfer applicants were admitted for the 2015/16 academic year.

Over 81% of undergraduates receive a bachelor's degree in four years, with over 90% doing so within six years. 85% of undergraduates admitted to the college graduate from the college, and 91% graduate from some college at Berkeley. The college has a 4-year graduation policy, with extra semesters approved only in certain cases. Engineering Student Services provides academic advising, peer tutoring, and career services to engineering students. Various student organizations are run in conjunction with the college and many students belong to the student chapters of their corresponding professional organizations. Graduate admissions in the College of Engineering is administered by department. During the 2021/22 academic year, the college had 2,513 graduate students and awarded 228 masters and 244 doctorate degrees as well as 889 professional master's degrees.

The college's enrollment is approximately 32% women. Berkeley has one of the oldest, most active and award-winning sections of the Society of Women Engineers (SWE); established in 1975, it has been recognized with the "Outstanding Collegiate Section Gold Mission Award" at the annual SWE national conference, which is the largest gathering for women in engineering and technology. Among Berkeley engineering alumnae are a 2018 Nobel laureate, a 2008 Turing Award winner, a 2012 Turing Award winner, the first woman to receive a bachelor's degree in engineering from an American university, and the co-founders of Marvell Technology, Atheros Communications, and many other technology companies.

=== Businesses and entrepreneurship ===
The school is well-known for producing many successful entrepreneurs; among its alumni are the co-founders and CEOs of the largest companies in the world, including Apple, DoorDash, Coursera, Boeing, Google, Intel, and Tesla. Together with the Haas School of Business (the first American business school at a public university), the college confers joint degrees and advises the university's resident start-up incubator. Founded in 2012, Berkeley SkyDeck promotes research and entrepreneurship in Silicon Valley, and has become a top university incubator in the United States.

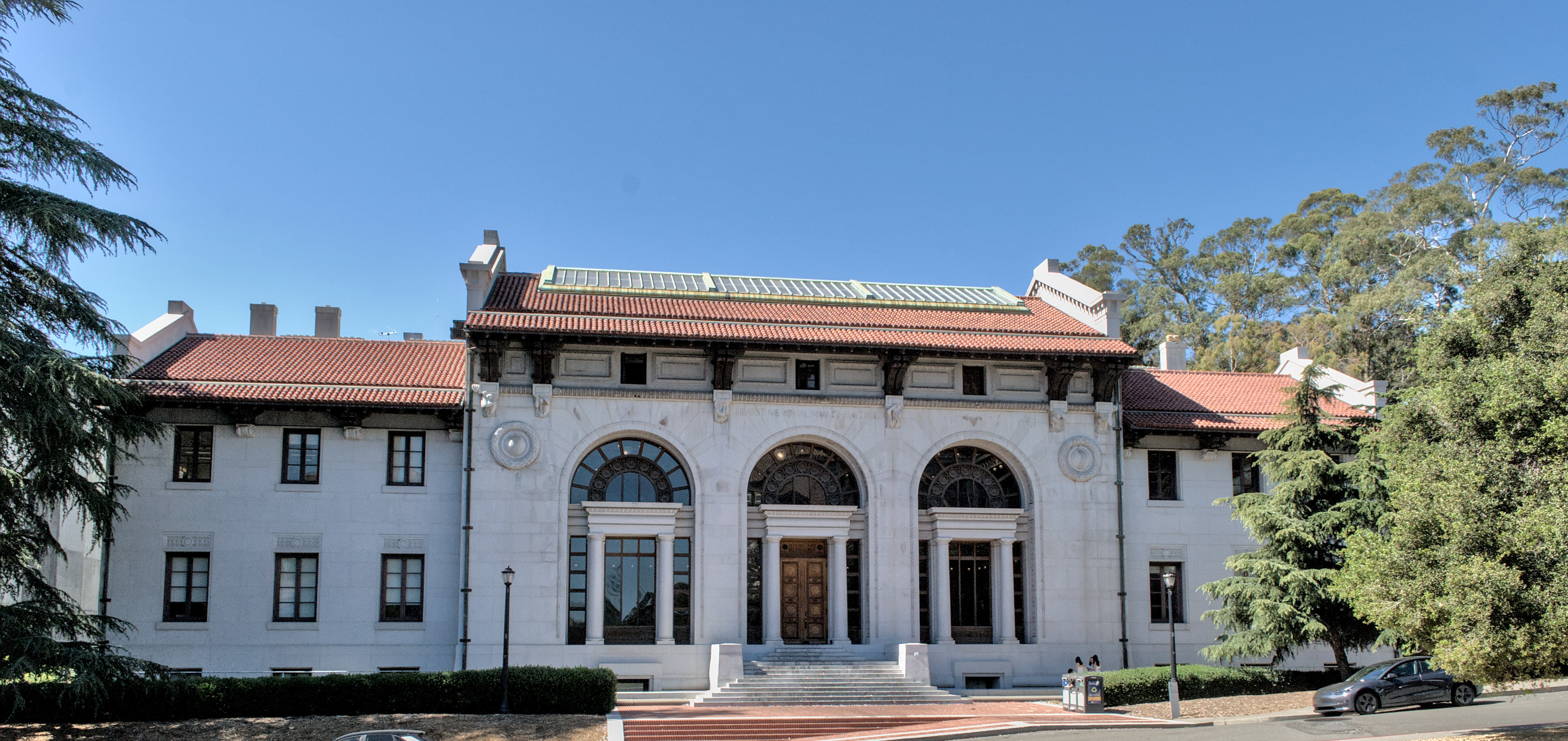
Built in 1907, Hearst Memorial Mining Building is home to the college's department of materials science and engineering

=== Student organizations ===
- Eta Kappa Nu (ΗΚΝ)
- Pioneers in Engineering (PiE)
- Out in Science, Technology, Engineering, Mathematics (oSTEM)
- Design for America (DFA)
- Society of Women Engineers (SWE)
- Black Engineering and Science Student Association (BESSA)
- Robotics @ Berkeley
- Machine Learning @ Berkeley
- Mobile Developers of Berkeley

== Research units ==
All research facilities are managed by one of five Organized Research Units (ORUs):

- Earthquake Engineering Research Center (EERC) — research and public safety programs against the destructive effects of earthquakes
- Electronics Research Laboratory (ERL) — the largest ORU; advanced research in novel areas within seven different university departments
- Engineering Systems Research Center (ESRC) — focuses on manufacturing, mechatronics, and microelectro mechanical systems (MEMS)
- Institute for Environmental Science and Engineering (IESE) — focuses on applying basic research to current and future environmental problems
- Institute of Transportation Studies (ITS) — sponsors research in transportation planning, policy analysis, environmental concerns and transportation system performance

=== Major research centers, institutes, and programs ===
- Berkeley Institute for Data Science (BIDS)
- Berkeley Institute of Design (BID)
- Berkeley Multimedia Research Center (BMRC)
- Center for Human-Compatible Artificial Intelligence (CHAI)
- Center for Information Technology Research in the Interest of Society (CITRIS)
- Center for Intelligent Systems (CIS) — developing a unified theoretical foundation for intelligent systems
- Consortium on Green Design and Manufacturing (CGDM)
- Digital Library Project (DLP)
- Institute of Transportation Studies (ITS)
- International Computer Science Institute (ICSI) — basic research institute focusing on Internet architecture, speech and language processing, artificial intelligence, and cognitive and theoretical computer science
- Intel Research Laboratory @ Berkeley
- Integrated Materials Laboratory (IML) — facilities for research in nano-structure growth, processing, and characterization
- Jacobs Institute for Design Innovation (JIDI)
- Joint BioEnergy Institute (JBEI)
- Microfabrication Laboratory (Microlab)
- The Millennium Project (TMP) — developing a hierarchical campus-wide "cluster of clusters" to support advanced computational applications
- Nokia Research Center @ Berkeley
- Pacific Earthquake Engineering Research Center (PEERC)
- Power Systems Engineering Research Center (PSERC)
- Simons Institute for the Theory of Computing (SITC)
- Simons Laufer Mathematical Sciences Institute (SLMath)

== Notable projects ==
- Berkeley Software Distribution (BSD)
- Berkeley Lower Extremity Exoskeleton (BLEEX)
- Multigate device (FinFET)
- Redundant Array of Inexpensive Disks (RAID)
- Simulation Program with Integrated Circuits Emphasis (SPICE)
- Reduced Instruction Set Computing Instruction set architecture (RISC-V)
- Apache Spark (large-scale data processing engine)

== Notable faculty ==
- Richard Karp — Turing Laureate for contributions to the field of algorithms
- William Kahan — Turing Laureate for fundamental contributions to numerical analysis
- Stuart Russell — author of Artificial Intelligence: A Modern Approach
- Ruzena Bajcsy — leader in computer vision and robotics
- Michael I. Jordan — most influential computer scientist in the world in 2016 according to Semantic Scholar
- Lotfi Zadeh — founder of fuzzy mathematics
- Jitendra Malik — leader in computer vision and graphics
- David Patterson — Turing Laureate for contributions to computer architecture, founder of reduced instruction set computing (RISC)
- Ken Goldberg — leader in robotics
- Christos Papadimitriou — leader in complexity theory
- Eli Yablonovitch — founder of the field of photonic crystals
- Scott Shenker — leader in networking research
- Jan Rabaey — pioneer in digital integrated circuit design
- Carlo H. Séquin — pioneer in processor design
- Claire J. Tomlin — leader in hybrid systems and control theory
- S. Shankar Sastry — Dean and leader in robotics and control theory
- Homayoon Kazerooni — leader in robotics
- Alice Agogino — leader in engineering diversity
- Paul K. Wright — leader in rapid prototyping
- Ashok Gadgil — environmental policy leader
- Luke Pyungse Lee — pioneer in bionanophotonics and integrated molecular diagnostics systems
- Jay Keasling — pioneer in synthetic biology
- Peidong Yang — leader in nanomaterials
- Ramamoorthy Ramesh — leader in ferroelectric materials
- Paul Alivisatos — authority on the synthesis of nanocrystals
- Ion Stoica — co-founder of Databricks and Conviva, leader in networking and systems research

== Notable alumni ==
- Howard P. Grant (BS 1948) — first African American to graduate from the College of Engineering and also the first African-American member of the American Society of Civil Engineers (1948)
- Douglas Engelbart (MS 1953, PhD 1955) — founder of the field of human-computer interaction, inventor of the computer mouse
- Eric Schmidt (MS 1975, PhD 1982) — executive chairman and former CEO of Google/Alphabet Inc.
- Bill Joy (MS 1979) — computer engineer and venture capitalist; co-founder of Sun Microsystems
- Paul E. Jacobs (BS 1984, MS 1986, PhD 1989) — former executive chairman of Qualcomm
- Sehat Sutardja (MS 1985, PhD 1988), Weili Dai (BS 1984), and Pantas Sutardja (BS 1983, MS 1985, PhD 1988) — founders of Marvell Technology
- Marc Tarpenning (BS 1985) — co-founder of Tesla Inc.
- Peter Norvig (PhD 1985) — director of research at Google, co-author of Artificial Intelligence: A Modern Approach
- Steve Wozniak (BS 1986) — co-founder of Apple Inc.
- Peyman Milanfar (joint bachelor's degree in mathematics and electrical engineering, 1988) — principal scientist/director at Google Research
- Craig Federighi (BS 1991, MS 1993) — senior vice president of software engineering at Apple Inc.
- Andrew Ng (PhD 2002) — co-founder and executive chairman at Coursera, chief scientist at Baidu
- Tony Xu (BS 2006) — co-founder and CEO of DoorDash
- Eleven Turing Laureate Alumni — Barbara Liskov, Butler Lampson, Charles P. Thacker, Dana Scott, Douglas Engelbart, Jim Gray, Ken Thompson, Leonard Adleman, Niklaus Wirth, Shafi Goldwasser, Silvio Micali

== See also ==
- List of engineering schools
- List of University of California, Berkeley alumni
- List of University of California, Berkeley faculty
