= Howard P. Grant =

African American civil engineer

Howard P. Grant was an African American civil engineer.

== Early life and education ==
Grant moved to Los Angeles, California after serving in the Air Force with his family. He became the first African American to graduate from the UC Berkeley College of Engineering (Bachelor of Science degree in civil engineering) in 1948. Another accomplishment in the year of 1948 included him becoming the first black member of the American Society of Civil Engineers.

== Career ==
After college, Grant worked as the first African American civil engineer for many departments including the City and County of San Francisco and the San Francisco Water Department until 1984. He became the second black man to obtain a civil engineer license from the State of California. He also served the California Society of Professional Engineers as the President and Treasurer. In addition to his accomplishments, he was one of the founders and President of the North California Council of Black Professional Engineers, also known as NCCBPE, from 1970 to 1973. This group's mission is to catalyze the careers of African Americans adults and youth within the engineer career field through community education about science and engineering. These accomplishments led to his reputation of being an inspiration and mentor for the state of California and the nation. Grant also served as a board member of the Engineering Societies Committee for Manpower Training, Big Brothers, Hunter's Point's Boy's Club, and Urban League's scholarship committee for San Francisco.
