= Yoshiyuki Sankai =

Japanese businessman and academic

- Born: 1958 or 1959 (age 66–67)
- Education: University of Tsukuba
- Occupations: Founder, president and CEO, Cyberdyne
- Known for: HAL

Yoshiyuki Sankai (born 1958/1959) is a Japanese billionaire businessman and academic. He is the founder, president and CEO of the cyborg-robot maker Cyberdyne, as well as a professor of the Graduate School of Systems & Information Engineering at the University of Tsukuba.

== Early life ==
Sankai has a doctorate in engineering from the University of Tsukuba.

== Career ==
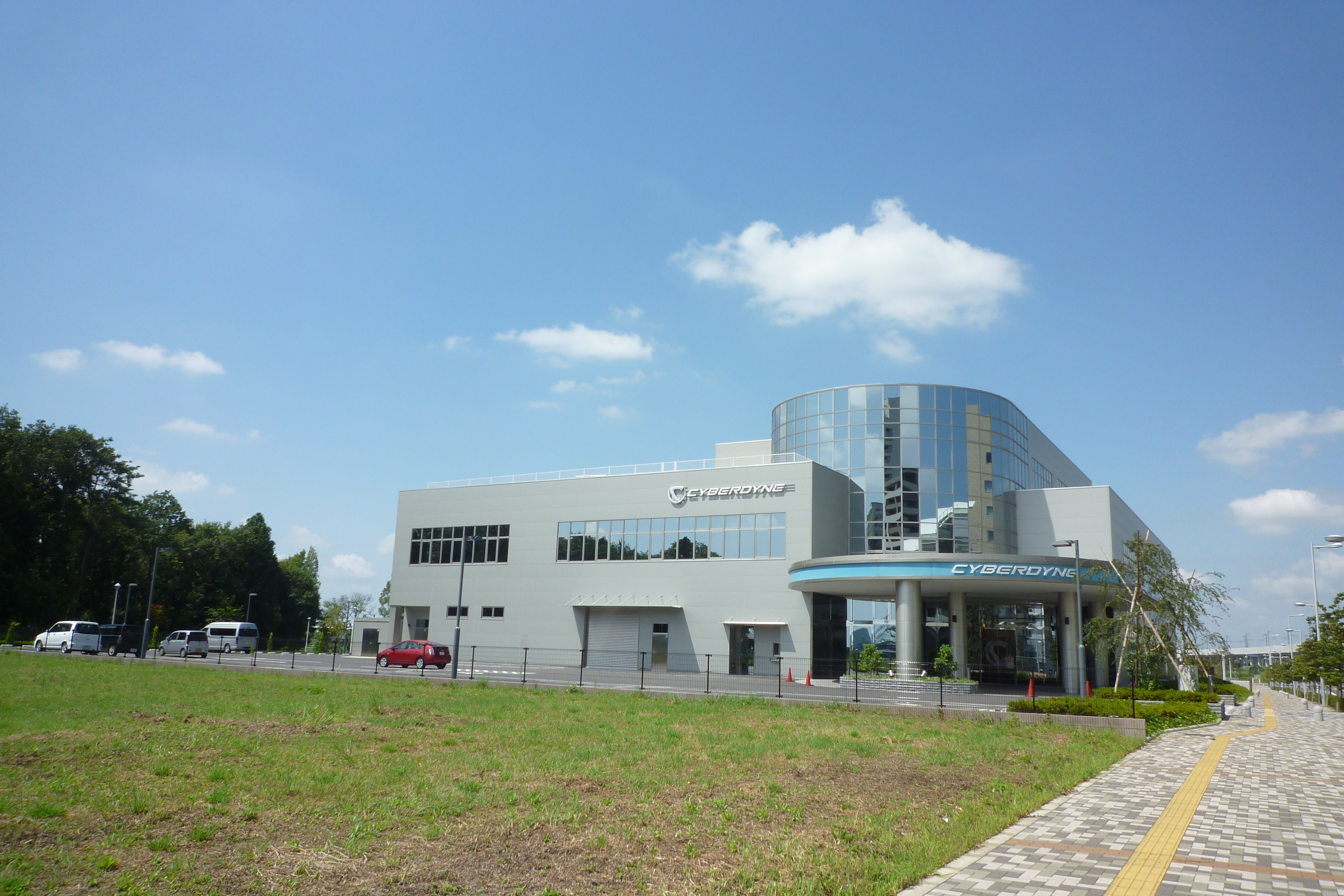
Cyberdyne headquarters

Sankai is a professor of the Graduate School of Systems & Information Engineering at the University of Tsukuba. He is also a visiting professor at Baylor College of Medicine, Houston, Texas, US.

Sankai led the University of Tsukuba and Cyberdyne team that developed the Hybrid Assistive Limb powered exoskeleton. Sankai later became an international fellow at the Royal Swedish Academy of Engineering Sciences (IVA).

== Personal life ==
Sankai lives in Ibaraki, Japan.
