= ReWalk =

Bionic walking assistance system

Lifeward Ltd.
- Manufacturer: Lifeward Ltd.
- Year of creation: 2011 (FDA approval)
- Type: Powered exoskeleton
- Purpose: Medical
- Website: Lifeward
- Type: Public
- Traded as: Nasdaq: LFWD; Russell Microcap Index component

ReWalk is a commercial bionic walking assistance system that uses powered leg attachments to enable paraplegics to stand upright, walk and climb stairs. The system is powered by a backpack battery, and is controlled by a simple wrist-mounted remote which detects and enhances the user's movements. Designed in Yokneam, Israel, by Amit Goffer, the ReWalk is marketed by Lifeward Ltd., and is priced at approximately US$85,000 per unit.

The device underwent clinical trials at MossRehab in suburban Philadelphia. In July 2014, ReWalk Robotics filed for an American initial public offering that could raise up to US$58 million. The company is listed on the NASDAQ stock exchange under the symbol "LFWD".

== Versions ==
At the time of its initial release, ReWalk was available in two versions – the ReWalk I and the ReWalk P. The ReWalk I is used by medical institutions for research or therapy to be used under the supervision of a healthcare professional. The ReWalk P is for personal use by patients at home or in public.

An updated version, ReWalk Rehabilitation 2.0, was released in January 2013. The ReWalk 2.0 featured improved sizing for taller individuals and some enhancement in controlling software.

== Operation ==
The ReWalk system weighs approximately 23.3 kg (51 lb); the backpack containing the system's Windows-operated computer and battery weighs around 2.3 kg (5.1 lb), and the robotic leg attachments weigh around 21 kg (46 lb). The user can engage in three modes: walking, sitting, and standing. The signals to these modes are sent via a wrist-watch type device to the computer.

== Users ==
The first clinical trial for The ReWalk was held at MossRehab located in Philadelphia in 2009. The ReWalk was approved for hospital use in the United States by the Food and Drug Administration (FDA) in 2011. FDA approval for home and public use was issued in June 2014. ReWalk is also the first exoskeleton to receive FDA clearance for personal and rehabilitation use in the United States.

In 2010, a prototype ReWalk appeared in the American TV series Glee; the exoskeleton is used by fictional character Artie Abrams during the Season 2 episode "A Very Glee Christmas".

On 8 May 2012, paralyzed British woman Claire Lomas became the first person to finish a marathon using a bionic assistance suit. Lomas, who was paralyzed from the waist down in a 2007 riding accident, completed the London Marathon in 17 days with her ReWalk system. Later in 2012, Lomas became the first person to take the ReWalk suit home for assistance with everyday tasks, and participated in the opening ceremony of the 2012 Summer Paralympics in her ReWalk.

By 2015, Japanese robotics maker Yaskawa Electric Co. has been distributing ReWalk in Asia, i.e. China, under a deal signed in 2014 with ReWalk Robotics. However, in Japan itself ReWalk faces a long approval process that is typical for Japanese businesses. This is due to tight regulation laws in Japan that has been in effect for the last decade.

== Criticisms ==
The weight and bulk of the ReWalk exoskeleton is considered to be too much for some users by its creator, Amit Goffer. In addition, with a price of between US$69,500 to US$85,000, the system is beyond the reach of many patients, especially because, as of July 2014, health insurance in the United States does not yet cover the ReWalk. Larry Jasinski, the CEO of ReWalk, stated in 2014 that the company is "working with insurers and other health-care coverage providers to ensure individuals eligible to use the ReWalk are able to purchase a system".

Medicare now covers ReWalk https://mobilitymgmt.com/rewalk-robotics-lauds-medicare-allowable-for-personal-exoskeletons/

See also https://finance.yahoo.com/news/lifeward-rewalk-personal-exoskeleton-now-130000072.html and https://www.massdevice.com/rewalk-robotics-solidified-medicare-coverage-exoskeleton/

== See also ==
- Israeli inventions and discoveries
- Ekso Bionics
- Hybrid Assistive Limb
- Vanderbilt exoskeleton
