= Human Universal Load Carrier =

Exoskeleton

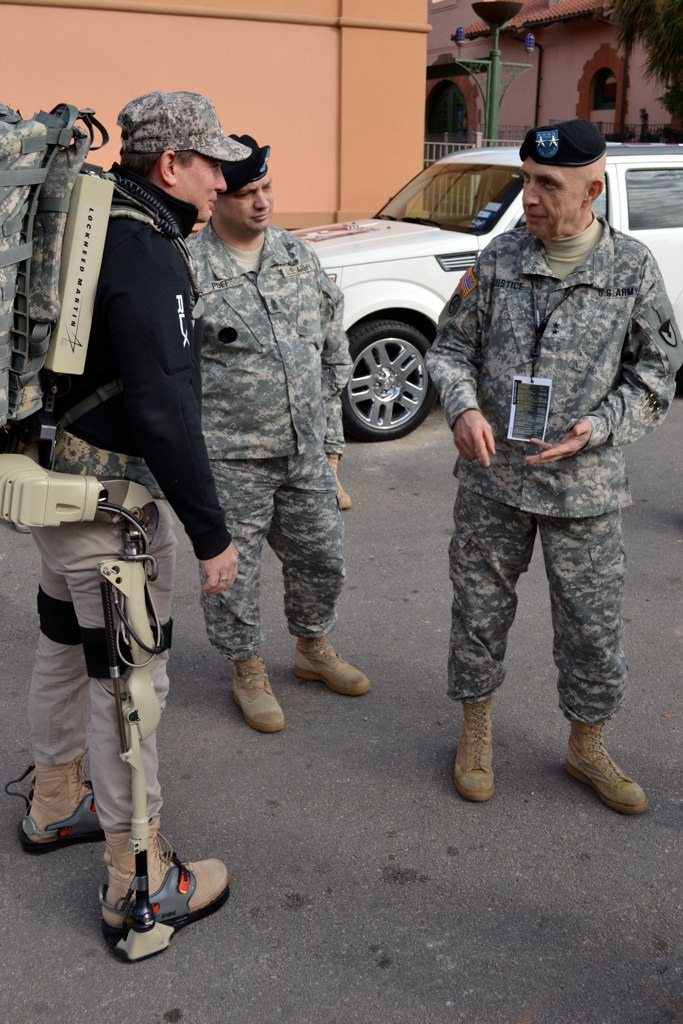
Human Universal Load Carrier

Human Universal Load Carrier, or HULC, is an un-tethered, hydraulic-powered anthropomorphic exoskeleton developed by Professor H. Kazerooni and his team at Ekso Bionics. It is intended to help soldiers in combat carry a load of up to 200 pounds at a top speed of 10 miles per hour for extended periods of time. After being under development at Berkeley Robotics and Human Engineering Laboratory since 2000, the system was announced publicly at the AUSA Winter Symposium on February 26, 2009, when an exclusive licensing agreement was reached with Lockheed Martin. Although the exoskeleton is powered and can be used, the project was a failure as it hindered certain movements and actually increased strain on muscles, going directly against what a powered exoskeleton is supposed to do.

== Development ==
Lockheed Martin entered into an exclusive licensing agreement with Ekso Bionics (formerly Berkeley Bionics) in January 2009. The program is based in Orlando Florida at the Lockheed Martin Missiles & Fire Control business unit and the program manager is Jim Ni.

Lockheed Martin is currently developing a new, ruggedized HULC system which will be evaluated by the US Army Natick Soldier Research, Development and Engineering Center (NSRDEC). The upgraded HULC system includes optimized control software, extended battery life and human factors improvements for quicker and easier sizing to each user. Lockheed Martin is also exploring exoskeleton designs to support industrial and medical applications.

The HULC is a lower extremity, general purpose load carriage platform. It can be adapted for specific missions such as logistics with the addition of accessories. Lockheed Martin recently released a new product card for a lift assist device that attaches to the HULC system and provides the user with power assisted lift.

In May 2012, Lockheed announced a lighter and energy-efficient HULC, with power to last eight hours on marches or days just standing, would go for field tests by the Army in September. If tests went well, it could be deployed with combat troops before the end of the year. Although the HULC was tested by the Army, it was never fielded.

=== Funding ===
The US Army Natick Soldier Research, Development and Engineering Center (NSRDEC) awarded Lockheed Martin a $1.1M contract in July 2010 for test & evaluation of upgraded HULC units. Laboratory testing is scheduled for early 2011 followed by field trials.

== Technology and features ==
The HULC is a battery-powered, lower extremity exoskeleton. It carries up to 200 lb, distributed between the front and back of the device. Loads attach to the exoskeleton system and are carried by the exoskeleton, bypassing the human operator. The effective forces felt by the operator are dramatically diminished reducing the risk of muscular/skeletal injuries.

The HULC provides power assistance at the hip and knee joint. The innovative hydraulic architecture is highly efficient enabling the system to run on batteries. Other exoskeleton systems, such as the Raytheon/SARCOS XOS 2 system are tethered to a power generator. Lockheed Martin announced that it is evaluating fuel cell power sources to increase the duration to support a 96-hour mission.

HULC is also easy to put on. It arrives folded in a small package, so soldiers just have to stretch out a leg and step into foot beds underneath the boot. Straps then wrap around the thighs, waist and shoulders. Sensors in the foot pads relay information to an onboard microcomputer that moves the hydraulic system to amplify and enhance the wearer's movement. The flexibility of the system allows soldiers to run, walk, kneel, crawl, and even go into low squats.

There is no joystick or control mechanism, instead sensors detect movement and, using an onboard micro-computer, make the suit move in time with the body. The system's titanium structure and hydraulic power augments the soldier's ability, strength and performance, whereas its modularity allows components to be switched and replaced with ease.

Most recently, the HULC has been evaluated at the US Army Natick Soldier Research, Development and Engineering Center in Massachusetts, US, with the upgraded system including extended battery life and optimised control software.

== Applications ==
Lockheed Martin originally developed the HULC to assist soldiers during combat. It could be used to help lift heavy loads while exerting minimal effort, with soldiers currently going into combat with up to 130 pounds of combat gear. Also, it could be used as a framework for body armor or sensor arrays that would allow for better situational awareness during combat. Lockheed Martin is also exploring exoskeleton designs to support industrial and medical applications.

== See also ==
- Lockheed Martin
- Powered exoskeleton

=== Press releases ===
- Lockheed Martin Unveils Exoskeleton Technology at AUSA Winter Symposium
