= The Mall (Bromley) =

Shopping centre in Bromley, England

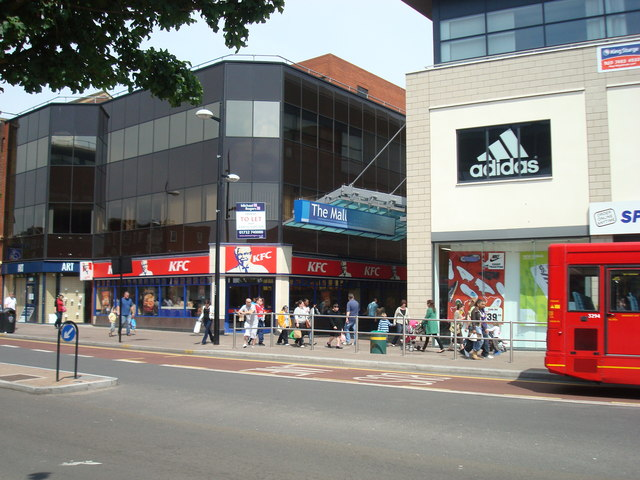
- High Street entrance to The Mall
- Location: Bromley, England
- Coordinates: 51.4024°N 0.0173°E
- Opened: 1970; 56 years ago
- Manager: Henry Boot Developments / Collier and Madge, Carpark managed by NCP
- Num. of stores: 21
- Num. of anchor tenants: 3
- Floor area: 87,145 sq ft
- Floors: 1 shopping (most shops on more than 1 floor), 4 car parking

The Mall is a shopping centre in Bromley, South East London, England. It is small in size compared to the main shopping centre in Bromley, The Glades.

== History ==
The Mall was owned by Henry Boot Developments; the shops between and including Your Local and The Mall News are owned by Threadneedle Property investments. The reason for this is because this building was there before The Mall opened. At that time it was wholly occupied by British Gas showroom. In 1979 75 High street as it was, and still partly is, was divided into 7 units (75 High Street (currently Art at Home), another 75 High Street (which remained a British Gas showroom, now KFC), 32, 28/30 (which has never been individual units), 26 and 24) and was extended up to the part currently owned by Henry Boot Developments (currently Strattons Jewelers).

The Mall has been refurbished and redeveloped by Henry Boot Developments with completion in 2007. The redevelopment planned to bring new shops, a gym, large department store and bike parking however the bike parking was not installed and the planned gym was later converted to office space which has never been occupied (although has been used by the maintenance company The Mall uses). The large department store became Uniqlo, Poundland and an empty shop, Poundland extended into half of the empty shop, the other empty half remains vacant The document is however inaccurate, it says that The Mall was originally built in the early 1960s. The Mall was, in fact, originally built in the late 1960s and opened in September 1970 on the land which was previously a school that was still there in the early 1960s. Another inaccuracy is that they claim that the property had been underinvested for almost 30 years before it was acquired by Henry Boot Developments in approximately 2003, suggesting there were underinvestments since 1973. This is not true, because in 1973 The Mall had only been open for 3 years and there were developments in 1983 with kiosks added which were later removed in approximately 1985, 1993 and 2000.

The Mall appeared on the cover of the 1982 album Sounds like Bromley by Bromley-born Billy Jenkins. The picture is of the rear of what is now Poundland (Bromley Toy Fayre and Bramber Womenswear at the time) to the right and the car park above Argos (J Sainsbury at the time).

In 2019, Henry Boot Developments sold The Mall to a consortium of international investors for £20 million.

=== Redevelopment ===
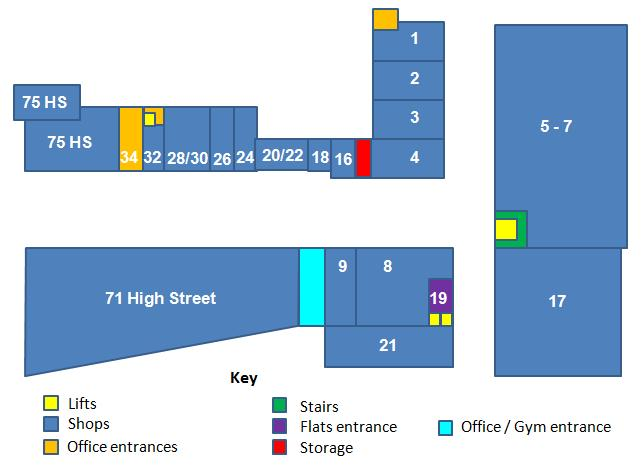
Redeveloped store layout (not to scale)

=== Phase 1 ===
The shops along the east side were extended at the front and back. The first floor from those shops were taken away except for Poundland which also has the first floor of unit 6 (A.K.A. unit 5a) (currently vacant but used to store the Christmas decorations). The lift and stairs were moved from between the buildings to next to the east side of the building.

The west side was not extended but the 1st floors were made smaller and raised. The shops on the west side were originally meant to have the 1st floors as retail use, they were designed to have a large balcony overlooking the lower floor and windows from floor to ceiling however only sevenoaks furniture use unit 4 in the way these units were designed to be used. Currently unit 1 has their 1st floor covered up with a wall covering where the balcony should be, unit 2 has a false ceiling with approx 6-foot high empty space above it and unit 3's 1st floor is covered up like unit 1 but it used by shoezone in unit 2.

Sevenoaks Furniture extended the upper floor of Unit 1 in approx. 2004. Unit 1 has the largest upper floor out of units 1–4. Due to the upper floors being small Shoe Zone also has the 1st floor of Unit 3 and Emporium Seven were seeking permission to extend the first floor of unit 1 making the 1st floor almost as big as the ground floor.

=== Phase 2 ===
The entrance to offices was moved, and the building which is occupied by Sports World was built with an additional floor for a gym and space for parking bikes on the ground floor to meet Bromley council's request for bike parking. The gym and bike parking ideas were later scrapped, the gym became office space which has never been occupied by a company long term.

=== Stores ===
As of 2021 retailers in the shopping centre include; Shoe Zone and Poundland, Argos, and Iceland have now closed down.

== Transport ==
There are two train stations in Bromley that serve the mall:

- Bromley South railway station
- Bromley North railway station

There is also a bus interchange outside the centre.
