= Hybrid Assistive Limb =

Powered exoskeleton suit

Hybrid Assistive Limb (HAL)
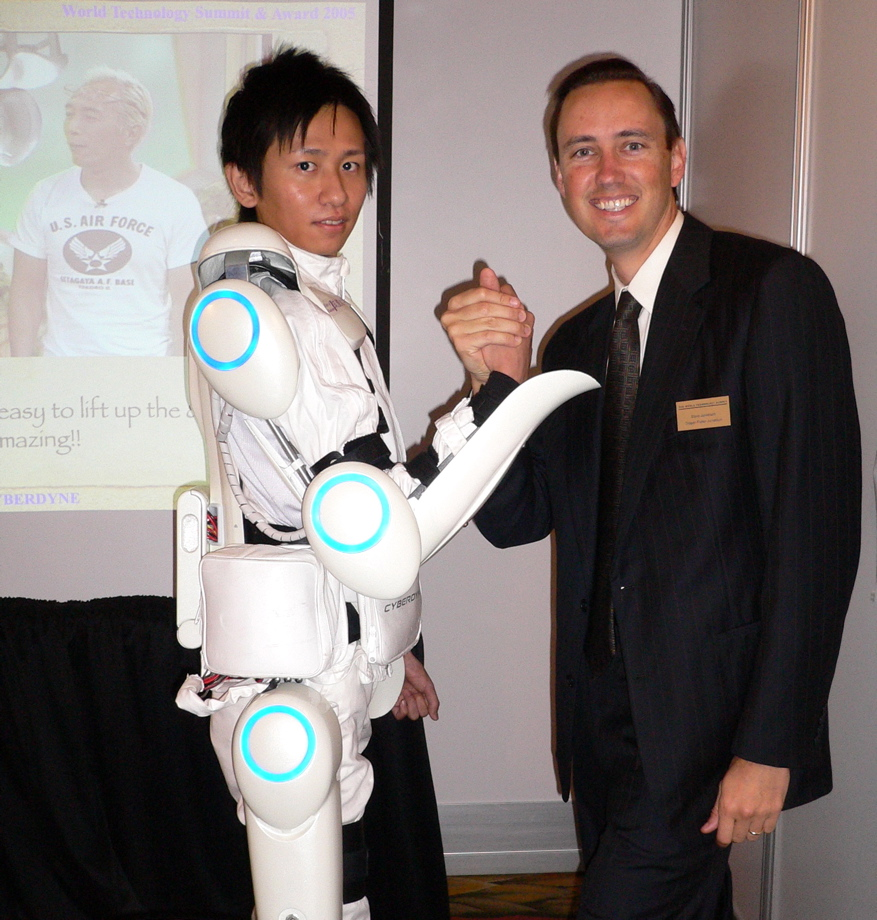
- A man wearing a 2005 prototype version of the HAL suit (left)
- Manufacturer: Cyberdyne
- Country: Japan
- Year of creation: 1997 (earliest prototype); 2012 (full HAL-5 suit)
- Type: Powered exoskeleton Soft exoskeleton
- Purpose: Medical; Search and rescue
- Website: cyberdyne.jp

The Hybrid Assistive Limb (also known as HAL) is a powered, soft-bodied exoskeleton suit developed by Japan's Tsukuba University and the robotics company Cyberdyne. It is designed to support and expand the physical capabilities of its users, particularly people with physical disabilities. There are two primary versions of the system: HAL 3, which only provides leg function, and HAL 5, which is a full-body exoskeleton for the arms, legs, and torso.

In 2011, Cyberdyne and Tsukuba University jointly announced that hospital trials of the full HAL suit would begin in 2012, with tests to continue until 2014 or 2015. By October 2012, HAL suits were in use by 130 different medical institutions across Japan. In February 2013, the HAL system became the first powered exoskeleton to receive global safety certification. In August 2013, HAL received EC certification for clinical use in Europe as the world's first non-surgical medical treatment robot. In addition to its medical applications, the HAL exoskeleton has been used in construction and disaster response work.

== History ==
The first HAL prototype was proposed by Yoshiyuki Sankai, a professor at Tsukuba University. Fascinated with robots since he was in the third grade, Sankai had striven to make a robotic suit in order "to support humans". In 1989, after receiving his PhD in robotics, he began the development of HAL. Sankai spent three years, from 1990 to 1993, mapping out the neurons that govern leg movement. It took him and his team an additional four years to make a prototype of the hardware.

The third HAL prototype, developed in the early 2000s, was attached to a computer. Its battery alone weighed nearly 22 kilograms (49 lb) and required two helpers to put on, making it very impractical. By contrast, later HAL-5 model weighs only 10 kilograms (22 lb) and has its battery and control computer strapped around the waist of the wearer.

Cyberdyne began renting the HAL suit out for medical purposes in 2008. By October 2012, over 300 HAL suits were in use by 130 medical facilities and nursing homes across Japan. The suit is available for institutional rental, in Japan only, for a monthly fee of US$2,000. In December 2012, Cyberdyne was certified ISO 13485 – an international quality standard for design and manufacture of medical devices – by Underwriters Laboratories. In late February 2013, the HAL suit received a global safety certificate, becoming the first powered exoskeleton to do so. In August 2013, the suit received an EC certificate, permitting its use for medical purposes in Europe as the first medical treatment robot of its kind.

== Design and mechanics ==
When a person attempts to move their body, nerve signals are sent from the brain to the muscles through the motor neurons, moving the musculoskeletal system. When this happens, small biosignals can be detected on the surface of the skin. The HAL suit registers these signals through a sensor attached to the skin of the wearer. Based on the signals obtained, the power unit moves the joint to support and amplify the wearer's motion. The HAL suit possesses a cybernic control system consisting of both a user-activated "voluntary control system" known as Cybernic Voluntary Control (CVC) and a "robotic autonomous control system" known as Cybernic Autonomous Control (CAC) for automatic motion support.

The HAL design is notable for its soft body and frame, with comfort and ease of use cited as potential benefits of this lack of a rigid body.

== Users ==
HAL is designed to assist people who are disabled or elderly in their daily tasks, but can also be used to support workers with physically demanding jobs such as disaster rescue or construction. HAL is mainly used by disabled patients in hospitals, and can be modified so that patients can use it for longer-term rehabilitation. In addition, scientific studies have shown that, in combination with specially-created therapeutic games, powered exoskeletons like the HAL-5 can stimulate cognitive activities and help disabled children walk while playing. Further scientific studies have shown that HAL Therapy can be effectively used for rehabilitation after spinal cord injury or stroke.

During the 2011 Consumer Electronics Show, it was announced that the United States government had expressed interest in purchasing HAL suits. In March 2011, Cyberdyne presented a legs-only HAL version for those with disabilities, health care professionals and factory workers. In November 2011, HAL was selected to be used for cleanup work at the site of the Fukushima nuclear accident. During the Japan Robot Week exhibition in Tokyo in October 2012, a redesigned version of HAL was presented, designed specifically for the Fukushima cleanup. In March 2013, ten Japanese hospitals conducted clinical tests of the newer legs-only HAL system. In late 2014, HAL exoskeletons modified for construction use entered service with the Japanese construction contractor Obayashi Corporation.

== See also ==
- Atlas (robot), a humanoid robot designed for search and rescue
- Ekso Bionics
- ReWalk
- Vanderbilt exoskeleton
