= Vanderbilt exoskeleton =

Powered exoskeleton

Indego
- Manufacturer: Vanderbilt University; Parker Hannifin
- Country: United States
- Year of creation: 2010 (prototype)
- Type: Powered exoskeleton
- Purpose: Medical

The Vanderbilt exoskeleton, marketed as Indego, is a powered exoskeleton designed by the Center for Intelligent Mechatronics at Vanderbilt University in the U.S. state of Tennessee. It is intended to assist paraplegics, stroke victims and other paralyzed or semi-paralyzed people to walk independently. Motion and control technologies manufacturer Parker Hannifin is funding further development, and plans to release the first commercial version of the exoskeleton in 2015.

== Rationale ==
In 2012, there were estimated to be over 270,000 Americans with long-term spinal cord injuries, of whom around 21 percent suffer from complete paraplegia. The lifetime cost of care and lost productivity for each paraplegic ranges from US$1.4 million to $2.2 million. However, since the late 2000s, robotics and battery technology have become sufficiently advanced to make wearable walking assistance devices viable.

== Design ==
The Vanderbilt exoskeleton weighs 27 pounds (12 kg) and can support users weighing up to 200 pounds (91 kg). It is strapped to the user's legs, and uses an onboard computer to detect the user's movements, which are then supported and amplified by battery-powered motors in the exoskeleton's hip and knee joints. It also uses functional electrical stimulation to enervate the muscles of paralyzed patients, improving their strength and circulation, and can be quickly disassembled for removal. It can be used interchangeably with a wheelchair, and can be donned without assistance, allowing disabled individuals significantly greater independence. It is compact enough for a person to sit in a normal chair without needing to remove the exoskeleton.

== Development ==
Vanderbilt University began testing its exoskeleton with paraplegics and medical experts at a rehabilitation center in Atlanta, Georgia, in 2010. In October 2012, Parker Hannifin signed an exclusive licensing agreement with Vanderbilt University for the right to develop and manufacture a commercial version of the exoskeleton, which it plans to release under the name Indego. Whereas current commercial exoskeletons can cost as much as $140,000, Parker Hannifin hopes to exploit its manufacturing capabilities and the Vanderbilt model's lightweight design to ensure that the Indego is significantly cheaper. In March 2014, Parker Hannifin entered into clinical trial agreements for the exoskeleton with several major medical rehabilitation centres. In December 2014, Parker Hannifin invested in Freedom Innovations, a California-based prosthetic technology company with which it had a pre-existing partnership, to further the development of Indego. Following regulatory approval, Parker Hannifin plans to release Indego in Europe in 2015 and in the United States in 2016.

== See also ==
- Ekso Bionics
- Hybrid Assistive Limb
- ReWalk
