= Cyberdyne Inc. =

Japanese robotics and technology company

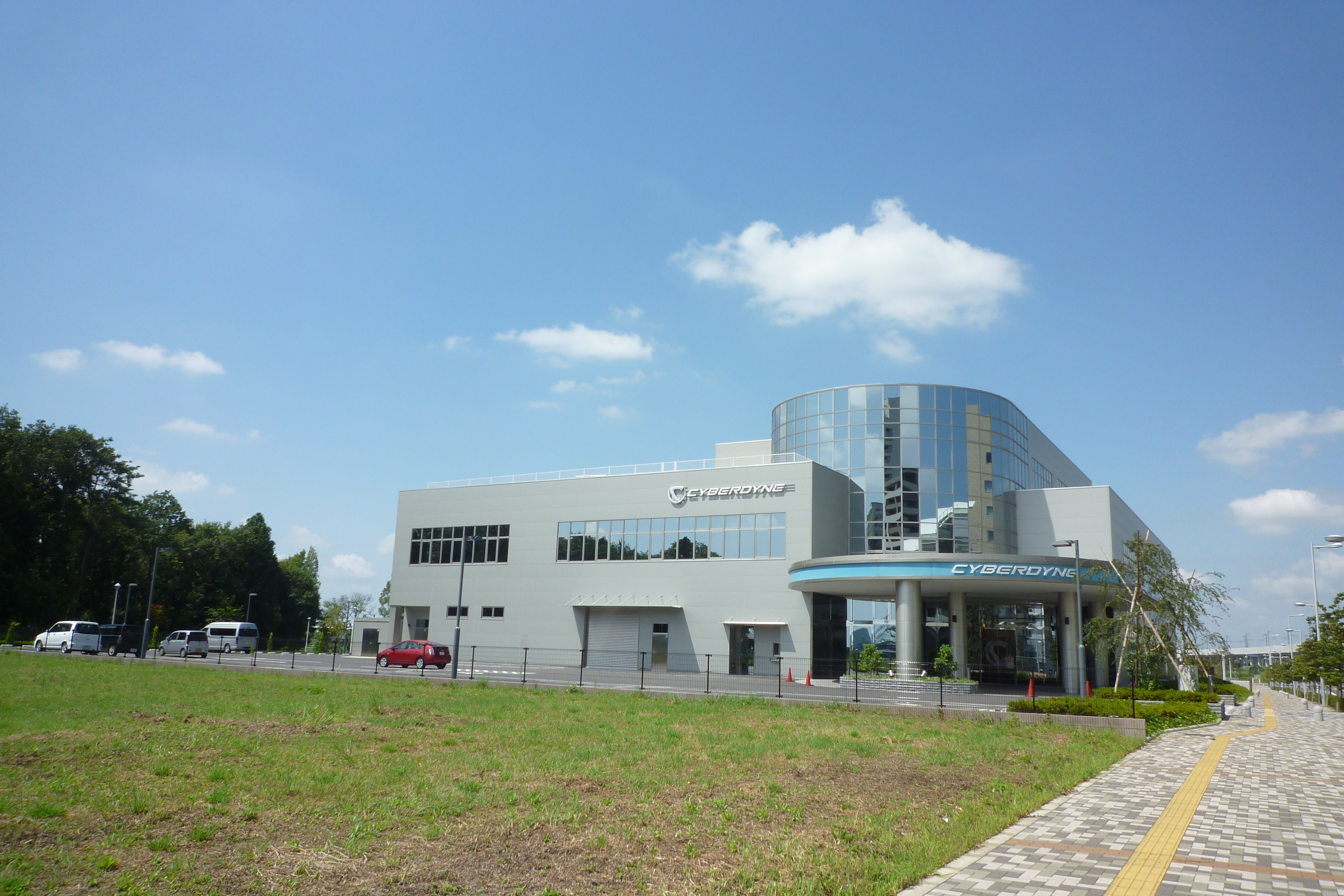
- Company headquarters in Tsukuba
- Industry: Robotics
- Founded: June 24, 2004; 22 years ago in Japan
- Founder: Yoshiyuki Sankai
- Headquarters: Japan
- Products: Robotic exoskeletons

Cyberdyne is a Japanese robotics and technology company most noted for the marketing and distribution of the HAL robotic exoskeleton suit.

== History ==
Cyberdyne was founded on June 24, 2004, by Yoshiyuki Sankai, a professor at the University of Tsukuba, as a venture company to develop his ideas for an exoskeleton suit.

The name is the same as a fictional company from the Terminator film series, which also produces robots. The name, however, is not necessarily a reference, but from the new academic fields of "Cybernetics", and the suffix "-dyne", referring to power. That being said, during an interview between Sankai and McG, director of Terminator Salvation, Sankai admits that he likes the Terminator franchise as well as 2001: A Space Odyssey.

In early 2009, Cyberdyne attracted international media attention with the announcement that it would be marketing and distributing the HAL 5 (Hybrid Assistive Limb) powered exoskeleton, which they claim augments body movement and increases user strength by up to ten times. As of February 2013, Cyberdyne has leased 330 HAL suits to 150 facilities across Japan, and HAL has been given a global safety certification that should allow it to be distributed outside Japan.

In 2017 March, Abdul Latif Jameel of Saudi Arabia signed a memorandum of understanding (MoU) with Cyberdyne Inc. in order to assist the victims of traumatic spinal injuries in Saudi Arabia.
