= Gun laws in the United States by state =

Gun laws in the United States regulate the sale, possession, and use of firearms and ammunition. State laws (and the laws of the District of Columbia and of the U.S. territories) vary considerably, and are independent of existing federal firearms laws, although they are sometimes broader or more limited in scope than the federal laws.

Forty-five states have a provision in their state constitutions similar to the Second Amendment of the U.S. Constitution, which protects the right to keep and bear arms. The exceptions are California, Maryland, Minnesota, New Jersey, and New York. In New York, however, the statutory civil rights laws contain a provision virtually identical to the Second Amendment. Additionally, the U.S. Supreme Court held in McDonald v. Chicago that the protections of the Second Amendment to keep and bear arms for self-defense in one's home apply against state governments and their political subdivisions.

Firearm owners are subject to the firearm laws of the state they are in, and not exclusively their state of residence. Reciprocity between states exists in certain situations, such as with regard to concealed carry permits. These are recognized on a state-by-state basis. For example, Idaho recognizes an Oregon permit, but Oregon does not recognize an Idaho permit. Florida issues a license to carry both concealed weapons and firearms, but others license only the concealed carry of firearms. Some states do not recognize out-of-state permits to carry a firearm at all, so it is important to understand the laws of each state when traveling with a handgun.

In many cases, state firearms laws can be considerably less restrictive than federal firearms laws. This does not confer any de jure immunity against prosecution for violations of the federal laws. However, state and local police departments are not legally obligated to enforce federal gun law as per the U.S. Supreme Court's ruling in Printz v. United States.

== Common subjects of state laws ==
Firearm related matters that are often regulated by state or local laws include the following:

- Some states and localities require that a person obtain a license or permit in order to purchase or possess firearms.
- Some states and localities require that individual firearms be registered with the police or with another law enforcement agency.
- Connecticut, Delaware, the District of Columbia, Hawaii, Maryland, Massachusetts, New Jersey, New York (handguns only), and Oregon require all firearms buyers to be fingerprinted. California requires a right thumbprint for purchase permits.
- All states allow some form of concealed carry, the carrying of a concealed firearm in public.
- Many states allow some form of open carry, the carrying of an unconcealed firearm in public on one's person or in a vehicle.
- Some states have state preemption for some or all gun laws, which means that only the state can legally regulate firearms. In other states, local governments can pass their own gun laws more restrictive than those of the state.
- Some states and localities place additional restrictions on certain semi-automatic firearms that they have defined as assault weapons, or on magazines that can hold more than a certain number of rounds of ammunition.
- NFA weapons are weapons that are heavily restricted at a federal level by the National Firearms Act of 1934 and the Firearm Owners Protection Act of 1986. These include automatic firearms (such as machine guns), short-barreled shotguns, and short-barreled rifles. Some states and localities place additional restrictions on such weapons.
- Some states have enacted castle doctrine or stand-your-ground laws, which provide a legal basis for individuals to use deadly force in self-defense in certain situations, without a duty to flee or retreat if possible.
- In some states, peaceable journey laws give additional leeway for the possession of firearms by travelers who are passing through to another destination.
- Some states require a background check of the buyer when a firearm is sold by a private party. (Federal law requires background checks for sales by licensed gun dealers, and for any interstate sales.)
- Some states have enacted red flag laws that enable a judge to issue an order to temporarily confiscate the firearms of a person who presents an imminent threat to others or to themselves.

== Overview ==
Recent history of state concealed carry laws
Unrestricted
"Shall issue", generally meaning obtaining a permit is straightforward
"May issue", meaning permits are at the discretion of the state
Banned

Minimum age to purchase long guns
21
21, 18 with parental consent
18
18 in cities, otherwise 16
18, 16 to transfer
No minimum age
No information available
Note that federal law sets a minimum age of 18.

Minimum age to purchase handguns
21
21 for purchases from dealers, 18 for private sales
18
No minimum age
No information available
Note that federal law sets a minimum age of 21. In September 2026 the DOJ stated that the law is unconstitutional and cannot be enforced. State age limits still apply.

Assault weapons bans
Long guns and handguns
Handguns only

== Alabama ==
Subject / law	Long guns	Handguns	Relevant statutes	Notes
State permit required to purchase?	No	No		
Firearm registration?	No	No		
Assault weapon law?	No	No		
Magazine capacity restriction?	No	No		
Owner license required?	No	No		
Permit required for concealed carry?	N/A	No	13A-11-75	Alabama is a "shall issue" state for citizens and lawful permanent residents who are 19 years or older. Permitless concealed carry for residents 18 years or older took effect on January 1, 2023.
Permit required for open carry?	No	No	13A-11-7	May carry openly without permit, except handgun must be secured in a holster.
Castle Doctrine/Stand Your Ground law?	Yes	Yes	13A-3-23	
State preemption of local restrictions?	Yes	Yes	13A-11-61.3	"...the Legislature hereby occupies and preempts the entire field of regulation in this state touching in any way upon firearms, ammunition, and firearm accessories..."
NFA weapons restricted?	No	No	13A-11-54	It is illegal to carry an Any Other Weapon (AOW) disguised as a walking cane.
Peaceable Journey laws?	No	No		
Background checks required for private sales?	No	No		

== Alaska ==
Subject / law	Long guns	Handguns	Relevant statutes	Notes
State permit required to purchase?	No	No		
Firearm registration?	No	No		
Assault weapon law?	No	No		
Magazine capacity restriction?	No	No		
Owner license required?	No	No		
Permit required for concealed carry?	N/A	No	AS 11.61.220; AS 18.65.700	Alaska is a "shall issue" state for citizens and lawful permanent residents who are 21 years or older. Permitless carry took effect on September 9, 2003.
Permit required for open carry?	No	No		May carry openly without permit.
State preemption of local restrictions?	Yes	Yes	AS 29.35.145	
NFA weapons restricted?	No	No		
Castle Doctrine / Stand your ground law?	Yes	Yes	AS 11.81.330	"A person who is justified in using nondeadly force in self-defense may use deadly force in self-defense upon another person when and to the extent, the person reasonably believes the use of deadly force is necessary for self-defense against death; serious physical injury; kidnapping except for what is described as custodial interference in the first degree in AS 11.41.320; sexual assault in the first degree; sexual assault in the second degree; sexual abuse of a minor in the first degree; or robbery in any degree."
Shall certify?	Yes	Yes	AS 18.65.810	Shall certify within 30 days.
Peaceable Journey laws?	No	No		
Background checks required for private sales?	No	No		
Duty to inform?	Yes	Yes	AS 11.61.220(a)(1)(A)(i)	

== Arizona ==
Subject / law	Long guns	Handguns	Relevant statutes	Notes
State permit required to purchase?	No	No		
Firearm registration?	No	No	A.R.S. § 13-3108	
Assault weapon law?	No	No		
Magazine capacity restriction?	No	No		
Owner license required?	No	No		
Permit required for concealed carry?	N/A	No	A.R.S. § 13-3102; A.R.S. § 13-3112	Arizona is a "shall issue" state for citizens and lawful permanent residents who are 21 years or older. Permitless carry took effect on July 29, 2010.
Permit required for open carry?	No	No		May carry openly without permit.
Castle Doctrine/Stand Your Ground law?	Yes	Yes	A.R.S. §§ 13-401 to 13-421	
State preemption of local restrictions?	Yes	Yes	A.R.S. § 13-3108	
NFA weapons restricted?	No	No		
Shall certify?	Yes	Yes	A.R.S. § 13-3121	Shall certify within 60 days.
Peaceable Journey laws?	No	No		
Background checks required for private sales?	No	No	A.R.S. § 44-1382	

== Arkansas ==
Subject / law	Long guns	Handguns	Relevant statutes	Notes
State permit required to purchase?	No	No		
Firearm registration?	No	No		
Assault weapon law?	No	No		
Magazine capacity restriction?	No	No		
Owner license required?	No	No		
Permit required for concealed carry?	N/A	No	AR Code § 5-73-120; AR Code §§ 5-73-301 to 5-73-320	Arkansas is a "shall issue" state for citizens and lawful permanent residents who are 21 years or older. Regular and Enhanced permits are issued. Enhanced permits are issued to those who complete a training course. Permitless carry took effect on August 16, 2013. Enhanced concealed carry permits allow for carrying in some areas such as carrying at public colleges, most public buildings, non-secure locations in airports, churches, and more.
Permit required for open carry?	No	No	AR Code § 5-73-120	
Castle Doctrine/Stand Your Ground law?	Yes	Yes	AR Code §§ 5-2-601 to 5-2-621	
State preemption of local restrictions?	Yes	Yes	AR Code § 14-16-504	
NFA weapons restricted?	Yes	No	AR Code § 5-73-207	Machine guns may not fire pistol cartridges of .30 in. or 7.63 mm or larger unless the gun is registered to an ammunition corporation.
Shall certify?	Yes	Yes	AR Code § 5-73-112	Shall certify within 15 days.
Peaceable Journey laws?	Yes	Yes	AR Code § 5-73-120	
Background checks required for private sales?	No	No		
Duty to inform?	Yes	Yes		

== California ==
Subject / law	Long guns	Handguns	Relevant statutes (Penal Code except when noted)	Notes
State permit required to purchase?	Partial	Partial	§26500	All firearm sales must be completed through a dealer. Firearm purchases require a Firearm Safety Certificate and proof of residency unless the individual purchasing the firearm is active duty military, honorably retired military, or a peace officer under Penal Code Section 830. Military reservists must provide proof of residency in order to purchase a firearm. The Firearms Safety Certificate can be purchased and completed at firearms dealers with DOJ instructors on the same day, differentiating it from a FOID or FID card system where one has to apply with the local police and await approval. Must be 21 to purchase any firearm.
Firearm registration?	Yes	Yes	§28150	The California Department of Justice ("DOJ") retains information about the purchaser and seller of all in-state firearm sales and transfers, and requires that any firearms imported into the state be reported to the DOJ. Furthermore, the Attorney General is required by law to maintain a registry containing the fingerprints and identifying information of the transferee, and the unique identifying information of every firearm transferred in the state, pursuant to §11106. All handgun serial numbers and sales are recorded by the state in the Department of Justice's Automated Firearms System, along with those of many long guns. While there is no requirement for California residents to register handguns owned prior to 1991 with law enforcement, §12025 and §12031 enhance several misdemeanor offenses to felonies if the handgun is not on file in the Department of Justice's Automated Firearms System. New residents must file a New Resident Report of Firearm Ownership with DOJ within 60 days for all firearms brought into the state, not only handguns (PC §27560). As of January 1, 2014, long gun serial numbers are also recorded, whereas previously only the sale was recorded. However, it is not required that owners of long guns purchased prior to 2014 register their firearms and it is not a crime to be in possession of an unregistered firearm.
Owner license required?	No	No	None	While the Firearm Safety Certificate (FSC) is required for new purchases of firearms, ongoing possession of a firearm does not require a license or permit. People moving into California are required, within 60 days, to file a New Resident Report of Firearm Ownership. New residents are prohibited from importing assault weapons or any other weapons prohibited by California law regardless of whether they were lawfully acquired and possessed in the residents' prior state of residence. The ban on importing large-capacity magazines was ruled unconstitutional but the ruling is on hold while the case is under appeal.
Assault weapon law?	Yes	Yes	§30500, §30515	Illegal to possess, import, or purchase assault weapons and .50 BMG rifles, unless such weapons were acquired by the owner prior to June 1, 1989. While California's Assault Weapons Law does allow individuals who hold a Dangerous Weapons Permit to obtain, transport or possess defined assault weapons, the DOJ generally does not issue Dangerous Weapons Permits to ordinary citizens. Legally defined assault weapons and .50 BMG rifles listed by make and model by the DOJ must be registered. Their sale and transfer is prohibited. Military look-alike rifles that are not chambered for .50 BMG and are not on the DOJ roster are legal to purchase or possess, with some restrictions in configuration – known as "banned features". Any active duty military personnel may apply for a Department of Justice (DOJ) Assault Weapon Permit to use personal assault weapons in military sanctioned activities during the course of permanent stationing in the State of California while on active military duty. The firearms must be registered with the California Department of Justice prior to the servicemember's arrival in California by submitting the registration form with a copy of the member's Permanent Change of Station (PCS) orders and an authorization letter from the installation commander. With the passage of Senate Bill 880 and Assembly Bill 1135 in June 2016, the state's assault weapon ban has been expanded to include all semi-automatic center-fire rifles and shotguns that have a "bullet button" detachable magazine; effectively repealing a prior law that made "bullet button" magazines required on all newly manufactured weapons with detachable magazines. The sale or transfer of such weapons will be prohibited, effective January 1, 2017. Those purchased prior to January 1, 2017 must be registered with the DOJ by the start of 2018. The definition of types of weapons that are banned has been expanded, the exact definitions should be reviewed at the California DOJ website.
Magazine capacity restriction?	Yes	Yes	§32310	Section 32310 of the Penal Code states that any person who manufactures or causes to be manufactured, imports into the state, keeps for sale, or offers or exposes for sale, or who gives, lends, buys, receives, or assembles any large-capacity magazine from a parts kit is punishable by imprisonment in a county jail not exceeding one year or imprisonment. Thus, the offenses listed can be charged as a felony or a misdemeanor at the discretion of the prosecutor. Large-capacity is defined as being able to hold more than 10 rounds. In November 2016 California voters approved Proposition 63. The referendum outlaws the possession of such magazines, requires background checks for all ammunition sales and mandates the reporting of lost or stolen firearms. Under Proposition 63, any person who possesses a large-capacity magazine is guilty of an infraction punishable by a fine not to exceed one hundred dollars ($100) per large-capacity magazine, or is guilty of a misdemeanor punishable by a fine not to exceed one hundred dollars ($100) per large-capacity magazine, by imprisonment in a county jail not to exceed one year, or by both that fine and imprisonment.This prohibition applies to magazines acquired prior to January 1, 2000 that were previously considered "grandfathered." Importation, manufacture, lending, assembling a large-capacity magazine from a parts kit, or buying a large-capacity magazine remains chargeable as a felony or a misdemeanor. On June 29, 2017, a federal judge blocked the enforcement of Proposition 63's ban on the possession of large-capacity magazines, pending the outcome of litigation concerning the ban. Magazines that would have been subject to the Proposition 63 ban are legal for private citizens to keep until the injunction is either lifted and/or the ban is upheld by the courts. On March 29, 2019, the entire large-capacity magazine law was blocked permanently by the district court; this includes the ban on possession, in addition to the ban on manufacturing, importing, selling, etc. Following a stay request from Attorney General, Judge Benitez allowed the ban on manufacture, import, and sale of large-capacity magazines to be enforced while keeping in place the injunction against the enforcement of the ban on possession of previously legal large-capacity magazines, including all purchases made between the entry of the Court’s injunction on March 29, 2019 and April 5, 2019, 5:00 p.m. On August 14, 2020, a 9th circuit court ruled the ban on high capacity magazines unconstitutional. "Gun owners cannot immediately rush to buy high-capacity magazines because a stay issued by the lower court judge remains in place," according to the Associated Press. However, this decision was vacated by the Circuit Court on February 25, 2021 until the case can be reheard. Duncan v. Bonta was heard en banc by the Ninth Circuit Court on June 22, 2021. The en banc Court overturned the lower appellate panel in its ruling, holding that California's regulation of firearms did not violate the 2nd Amendment.
License required for concealed carry?	N/A	Yes	§26150	"Shall issue," per Attorney General's directive after the Supreme Court's decision in New York State Rifle & Pistol Association, Inc. v. Bruen eliminated the "good cause" requirement. CCW permits valid statewide. Out-of-state permits not valid in California. On December 4, 2023, a lawsuit challenging California's laws forbidding nonresidents' concealed carry permits and nonresidents from obtaining California's CCW permit got filed. Penal Code §26045 provides an affirmative defense only to §25850 (carrying a loaded firearm), and only where the carry "would otherwise be lawful" — it does not authorize concealed carry without a permit under §25400.
Open carry allowed?	Partial	Partial	§26350	Long guns and handguns may be openly carried in unincorporated rural areas where firearm discharge is not prohibited by local ordinance. In a county with a population of less than 200,000 residents, a permit to carry a handgun "loaded and exposed" may be issued by the county sheriff, valid only in the issuing county. A person may also open carry if he or she "reasonably believes that any person or the property of any person is in immediate, grave danger and that the carrying of the weapon is necessary for the preservation of that person or property."
Vehicle carry?	No	Yes	§25610	A valid California Concealed Weapons License is required to carry a concealed handgun in a motor vehicle. Otherwise, handguns and assault weapons must be unloaded and in a locked container during transport; per PC §25610, the trunk qualifies as a locked container, but the glove compartment and utility/console boxes do not. Long guns not classified as assault weapons may be transported in a vehicle without being locked in a case, but must be unloaded.
State preemption of local restrictions?	Yes	Yes	§53701 Government Code Archived July 12, 2011, at the Wayback Machine	Most but not all local restrictions preempted.
Castle doctrine law?	Yes	Yes		California never requires a duty to retreat whether in one's own home or not. The state acknowledges a legal presumption that an intruder poses a deadly threat if in one's own home or property that is owned and controlled by oneself.
NFA weapons restricted?	Yes	Yes	§12220, §12020, §12020 §18710, §32625, §33215, §33410	Possession of automatic weapons or short-barreled shotguns or rifles prohibited without DOJ "Dangerous Weapons Permit"; permission rarely granted outside of film industry. Suppressors (aka silencers) prohibited under §33410 except by DOJ Dangerous Weapons Permit, which is generally issued only to a narrow class of holders (e.g., certain licensed manufacturers, film-industry armorers). Destructive devices are prohibited unless are designated as curios & relics, in which case a collectors permit can be obtained. The only AOWs that are permitted are smoothbore pistols and firearms with a combination of a smoothbore and rifle barrel. C&R short-barreled rifles and C&R short-barrled shotguns permitted.
Peaceable journey laws?	No	No		California courts have ruled that large-capacity magazines (LCM) that are disassembled or LCM parts are legal to possess. Otherwise federal rules are observed.
Waiting period?	Yes	Yes	§26815(a), §26950-27140 , §27540(a) , §27600-27750	California has a ten (10) day waiting period for all firearm purchases, transfers, and private sales which must be conducted through a federal and state firearm license holder. That is, upon purchase, the purchaser must wait 10 days after the purchase before the firearm is released to the owner. On August 25, 2014, the California's 10-day waiting period for gun purchases was ruled unconstitutional by the U.S. District Court for the Eastern District of California which found that "the 10-day waiting periods of Penal Code [sections 26815(a) and 27540(a)] violate the Second Amendment" as applied to members of certain classifications (notably holders of concealed carry permits) and "burdens the Second Amendment rights of the Plaintiffs". On December 14, 2016 this ruling was overturned by a three-judge panel of the 9th U.S. Circuit Court of Appeals. The plaintiffs' petition for an en banc rehearing was denied April 4, 2017; on February 20, 2018 the Supreme Court certiorari petition was denied, meaning that the waiting period remains in effect. On May 1, 2023, a new lawsuit challenging the ten-day waiting period was filed.
Background checks required for private sales?	Yes	Yes	§ 27545	Private party transfers of firearms must be conducted through a licensed dealer, who is required by federal law to conduct a background check and keep a record of the sale.
Red flag law?	Yes	Yes		The police or a person's family member can ask a judge to confiscate the firearms of a person who appears to pose a threat to themselves or others for up to one year. Such orders from out-of-state are also recognized. As of September 1, 2020, eligible petitioners will be expanded to include an employer, coworker, and school teacher or employee, and the maximum allowable duration will be extended to 5 years.
Background check required for ammunition purchase?	Yes	Yes	PC 30312, 30314, 30342, 30370	After January 1, 2018 all ammunition purchases must be made through a licensed ammunition dealer and no person may import ammunition from out-of-state unless they meet the requirements for exemption under PC 30314(b). This section effectively banned online and mail order sales of ammunition by requiring all transactions go through a storefront physically located inside California. Importing ammunition in violation of this section is an infraction for the first offense and a misdemeanor or infraction for any subsequent offenses. After July 1, 2019, all purchases of ammunition are required to have an "ammunition purchase authorization" from the California DOJ. This section requires the ammunition purchaser to submit to a background check and to have an entry in the California DOJ Automated Firearms System that matches the information presented at the time of purchase. Selling or delivering ammunition to a person without first receiving the "ammunition purchase authorization" is a misdemeanor. Background check was struck down by judge in Jan 2024. However, the 9th Circuit granted a stay to his injunction.
Home-built firearms restriction?	Yes	Yes	PC 29180, 29010	After July 1, 2018, any person who wishes to manufacture a firearm must first apply to the California DOJ for a serial number and apply that serial number, once issued, to the firearm within 10 days. There are specific requirements laid out for how to inscribe or engrave the serial number given the material the firearm is made out of. Violation of this provision is a misdemeanor punishable by up to 1 year in the county jail for home-built handguns and 6 months in the county jail for any other home-built firearm. In June 2022, California passed AB 1621, which bans the use of CNC milling machines for self-manufacturing firearms. On September 26, 2023, the restrictions were expanded to forbid people without a license to have 3-D printers "that has the sole or primary function of manufacturing firearms", and to allow civil actions against people who distribute "any code or digital instructions to a specified person for the manufacture of a firearm using a three-dimensional printer or CNC milling machine." Starting January 1, 2024, a person cannot manufacture more than 3 firearms within the state in a calendar year without a license.
Purchase quantity and frequency restriction?	Yes	Yes	PC 27535	As of January 1, 2024, no person is allowed to purchase more than one firearm, which includes completed frames and receivers and firearm precursor parts, within any 30-day period. Starting January 1, 2025, all private party transactions except with some exemptions will be subject to the 1-in-30 restriction. On March 11, 2024, Judge William Q. Hayes declared that the 1-in-30 law as applied to handguns and semi-automatic centerfire rifles violates the Second Amendment. The Ninth Circuit lifted its stay of the district court's injunction on August 15, 2024, and on June 20, 2025 a unanimous panel affirmed the district court in a published opinion. In response, the California Legislature passed Assembly Bill 1078 (Chapter 570, Statutes of 2025), signed by Governor Gavin Newsom on October 10, 2025, which raised the 30-day purchase limit from one firearm to three, effective April 1, 2026.
Transfer quantity and frequency restriction?	Yes	Yes	PC 16730	As of January 1, 2020, no person without a license is allowed to make 6 or more firearm transactions (sale, lease, or transfer) per calendar year, regardless of the type of firearm, and no person is allowed to sell, lease, or transfer more than 50 total firearms per calendar year within those transactions.

== Colorado ==
Subject / law	Long guns	Handguns	Relevant statutes	Notes
State permit required to purchase?	No*	No*	Colo. Rev. Stat. § 18-12-116	Effective August 1st, 2026, it is unlawful to buy or sell "specified semiautomatic firearms" unless having obtained a Firearm Safety Course Eligibility Card and then completed a "basic firearms safety course" and/or an "extended firearms safety course". "Specified semiautomatic firearms" includes most semiautomatic firearms.
Firearm registration?	No	No	Colo. Rev. Stat. § 29-11.7-102	
Semi-automatic rifles	No*	No*	DRMC § 38-130	No state law prohibiting sale or possession of Semi-automatic firearms, but with the repeal of Colorado's statewide firearm preemption law in 2021, local restrictions or prohibitions on semi-automatic may exist. Denver ordinance bans "assault weapons" (Most semi-auto rifles with more than 21 round magazines). Vail banned "assault weapons" in 1994. Boulder city passed such an ordinance in May 2018.
Magazine capacity restriction?	Yes	Yes	Colo. Rev. Stat. §§ 18-12-302, 18-12-303	After July 1, 2013, magazines holding more than 15 rounds may not be sold, transferred, or possessed unless they were lawfully owned prior to July 1, 2013. Firearms with a tubular magazine which are either chambered in .22 rimfire or operated by lever action are exempt from this regulation, as are magazines "permanently altered" to limit the capacity to 15 or fewer. Boulder city passed an ordinance in May 2018 banning magazines holding more than 10 rounds (15 for handguns). The town of Vail banned magazines holding 21 or more rounds in 1994. On June 29, 2020, the Colorado Supreme Court upheld the constitutionality of the magazine restrictions.
Owner license required?	No	No		
Permit required for concealed carry?	N/A	Yes	Colo. Rev. Stat. § 18-12-203	Colorado is a shall issue state for concealed carry. Permits are issued by local sheriff offices to county residents.
Permit required for open carry?	No	No	Colo. Rev. Stat. § 18-12; DRMC §§ 38-117(b), 38-118	Legal without permit requirements except in Denver and other posted areas.
Concealed within a vehicle?	Yes	Yes	Colo. Rev. Stat. §§ 18-12-105(2b), 33-6-125; DRMC §§ 38-117(f), 38-118, 14-92	No permit is required. Pistols may be carried with chamber and magazine loaded. Rifles and shotguns must be carried with an empty chamber if the owner is in possession of a valid hunting license and that hunting season is in progress. Rounds in the magazine are permitted during that hunting season. A loaded weapon in a vehicle and a spotlight is prima facie evidence that one was attempting to illegally take game. Wildlife officers have full law enforcement powers.
State preemption of local restrictions?	partial	partial	Colo. Rev. Stat. § 29-11.7-103	Local ordinances are not preempted by state law, and Denver bans assault weapons and open carry. However, holders of concealed carry permits are exempt from most, but not all, local restrictions.
NFA weapons restricted?	No	No	CRS § 18-12-102	NFA items are defined as a "dangerous weapon". Subsection 5: "It shall be an affirmative defense to the charge of possessing a dangerous weapon...that said person has a valid permit and license for possession of such weapon."
Peaceable Journey laws?	Yes	Yes	Colo. Rev. Stat. § 18-12-105.6; DRMC §§ 38-117(f), 38-118	Denver's restrictions on transport/possession of firearms in vehicles do not apply to persons traveling to or from other jurisdictions; see Trinen v. City & County of Denver, 53 P.3d 754
Castle Doctrine?	Yes	Yes	Colo. Rev. Stat. § 18-1-704.5	A legal resident of a property has the right to use deadly force to defend themselves, other occupants, and property from armed or unarmed intruders.
Stand Your Ground Law?	Yes	Yes	Common Law Doctrine	“The common-law doctrine of retreat to the wall . . . is applicable in this jurisdiction only to such cases as where the defendant voluntarily enters into a fight or where the parties engage in mutual combat, or where the defendant, being the assailant, does not endeavor in good faith to decline any further struggle before firing the fatal shot, and possibly to other similar cases.”
Red flag law?	Yes	Yes	HB 19-1177	The police may temporarily confiscate firearms from people who are threatening to harm themselves or others or have been accused of the same by someone who resides at the same address of the subject, and then get a court order afterwards.
Waiting Period?	Yes	Yes	HB23-1219; Colo. Rev. Stat. § 18-12-115	Effective October 1, 2023, there is a mandatory three day waiting period between initiation of a background check and taking possession on most firearms transfers. Exceptions include antique firearms and transfers between family members.

== Connecticut ==
Subject / law	Long guns	Handguns	Relevant statutes	Notes
State permit required to purchase?	Yes	Yes	CGS 29–33(b), CGS 29–36(f), CGS 29-38m(c)	Certificate of Eligibility for Pistol and Revolvers, or Long Guns, or Ammunition required to purchase handguns, long guns, or ammunition, respectively, or a State Permit to Carry Pistols and Revolvers to purchase any of the above. Applicants must complete an approved safety course, and pass a National Instant Criminal Background Check System (NICS) background check and mental health records check prior to issuance of certificate. Certificates of Eligibility are granted on a May-Issue basis to qualified applicants and are valid for five years. With the passing of Public Act 13-3, hunting licenses (which take approximately 12 hours to complete versus the eight hours the NRA Basic Pistol Course takes) may no longer be used to purchase ammunition or long rifles. Long guns and ammunition purchased outside of Connecticut are not subject to the long gun and ammunition eligibility requirements (even if one is a Conn. resident) other than the two-week waiting period must be observed for long gun transfers out of state, unless one has a valid hunting license or carry permit.
Firearm registration?	Partial	Partial	CGS 53–202	Registration required for assault weapons purchased between September 13, 1994 and April 1, 2014 and for machine guns obtained before January 1, 2014. There is a de facto registry of the sale (including the serial numbers) of handguns and long guns purchased in the state that is maintained by the Department of Emergency Services and Public Protection (DESPP). Any transfer, be it from a dealer or private party, must be accompanied by an authorization number issued by the DESPP and a form containing personal and weapon identification (DPS-3-C) must be submitted to DESPP and local police. This form is collected and maintained on all guns purchased from FFL dealers as well. The DPS-3-C form is not required for long gun transfers made out of state, and there is no legal requirement/penalty to register firearms purchased out of state or lawfully obtained before April 1, 2014.
Assault weapons law?	Yes	Yes	CGS 53–202	Selective fire weapons, numerous specifically named firearms, some .50 BMG variant firearms, and semiautomatic center-fire firearms with one defining cosmetic feature are banned; banned weapons lawfully possessed prior to April 4, 2013, must have been registered with DESPP prior to January 1, 2014. Registered weapons may only be sold or transferred to a licensed gun dealer, to the State Police or local police department, transferred to a recipient outside of Connecticut or willed to a designated heir when the original owner/registrant becomes deceased. Assault weapons that are not specifically named on the state's assault weapons ban and were manufactured and lawfully obtained prior to September 13, 1994 do not require registration with DESPP and may be sold or transferred to any non-prohibited person provided that they are at least 21 years old. Exceptions exist for active and retired law enforcement and military members.
Magazine capacity restriction?	Yes	Yes	53-202w	As of April 4, 2013, magazines holding more than 10 rounds are considered Large Capacity Magazines (LCM), and such magazines manufactured after that date may not be sold or transferred within the state. Existing owners of LCMs may possess such magazines if they declare and register them with the DESPP before January 1, 2014; Owners of registered LCMs may not load such magazines with more than 10 rounds except when inside the owner's home or on the premises of a licensed shooting range. Even if an individual has a permit to carry a pistol or revolver, they can never carry, other than at a shooting range, a pistol that has an LCM loaded with more than 10 bullets. Possessing an unregistered Large Capacity Magazine obtained prior to the ban's effective date is an infraction with a $90 fine for the first offense, and a Class D felony (punishable by up to 5 years in prison and/or a $5,000 fine) for subsequent offenses. Unlawfully possessing a LCM obtained after the effective date of the ban is a Class D felony.
Owner license required?	No	No	None	
Permit required for concealed carry?	N/A	Yes	CGS 29–28	Shall-Issue, with Limited Discretion. Connecticut's pistol permit law specifies that issuing authorities May-Issue pistol permits to qualified applicants, but the state's courts have generally ruled that permits must be granted on a Shall-Issue basis to applicants meeting the state's qualifications for a pistol permit, as Connecticut does not require an applicant to "show good cause" for needing a permit. Issuing local authorities have limited discretion to deny a permit when he or she has personal knowledge of the applicant's character that would not otherwise be reflected on a background check. Denial on this basis would have to be justified with supporting evidence showing that the applicant is not of "suitable" character to be granted a pistol permit, but virtually all cases are thrown out if the applicant is not otherwise barred from owning firearms. Connecticut has a two-step permitting process: a 60-day Temporary permit issued by local authorities and a 5-year Regular permit issued by the Department of Emergency Services and Public Protection (DESPP). Issuance of a Temporary permit is technically not a prerequisite to apply for a Regular permit, but in practice an applicant must await a decision from local authorities on the temporary permit application before applying to DESPP for the Regular permit. If the local permit is denied for any reason, instead one files an appeal to DESPP to have the state board re-examine the application. If the state board denies the permit (rare occurrence), a court appeal is possible. Permit needed to carry open or concealed. Exceptions for peace officers and Active-Duty military members. Out of state permits not valid in Connecticut, but non-residents may apply for a Connecticut non-resident carry permit through the mail. Non-residents must have a carry permit issued by a United States jurisdiction to apply.
Permit required for open carry?	Illegal	Illegal		Effective October 1, 2023, the open carry of handguns and long guns is generally prohibited in Connecticut, except on property owned or lawfully controlled by the person carrying openly, at a designated shooting range, or while hunting.
Vehicle carry permitted?	No	Yes		A valid Connecticut pistol permit is required to carry a loaded weapon in a vehicle. Otherwise, the weapon must be unloaded and the firearm and its ammunition must be stored in locked containers during transport. As of October 1, 2019, handguns left in unattended vehicles are required to be stored in the trunk, locked safe, or locked glove box.
Duty to inform?	No	No		Connecticut is not a duty to inform state. Those who are carrying a pistol or revolver must carry their permit with them.
Castle Doctrine?	Yes	Yes	sec_53a-20	A person in possession or control of premises, or a person who is licensed or privileged to be in or upon such premises, is justified in using reasonable physical force upon another person when and to the extent that he reasonably believes such to be necessary to prevent or terminate the commission or attempted commission of a criminal trespass by such other person in or upon such premises; but he may use deadly physical force under such circumstances only (1) in defense of a person as prescribed in section 53a-19, or (2) when he reasonably believes such to be necessary to prevent an attempt by the trespasser to commit arson or any crime of violence, or (3) to the extent that he reasonably believes such to be necessary to prevent or terminate an unlawful entry by force into his dwelling as defined in section 53a-100, or place of work, and for the sole purpose of such prevention or termination.
State preemption of local restrictions?	Partial	Yes	CGS 29–28	State pre-emption of local ordinances not explicitly specified in state law, but established by court precedence. Most municipalities have ordinances restricting or banning the discharge of firearms outside of firing ranges or designated hunting areas during hunting seasons. Some municipalities have restrictions or bans on carrying long guns in public places. The City of New London and the City of New Britain previously had ordinances that forbade concealed carry of handguns, which have since been repealed in both cities. Some localities have zoning ordinances restricting or banning gun stores and/or shooting ranges within their boundaries.
NFA weapons restricted?	No	No	CGS 53–202(c)	SBR, SBS, DD, suppressors are legal, provided they also comply with the assault weapons provisions, unless purchased before October 1, 1993. Machine guns are legal if purchased and registered with the state before January 1, 2014. Non-selective fire machine guns may be transferred to another resident within Connecticut.
Peaceable Journey laws?	No	No	CGS 29–38(d)	Federal rules observed.
Background checks required for private sales?	Yes	Yes	CGS 29-36l	Private party firearm transfers require that a NICS background check of the buyer be performed by the Department of Emergency Services and Public Protection – Special Licensing and Firearms Unit. This can be accomplished by the seller through a phone call to DESPP-SLFU.
Red flag law?	Yes	Yes		State law allows police, after investigating and determining probable cause, to get a court warrant and seize guns from anyone "posing an imminent risk of harming themselves or someone else".

== Delaware ==
Subject / law	Long guns	Handguns	Relevant statutes	Notes
State permit required to purchase?	No	Yes	§ 1448A	The Permit to Purchase law takes effect on November 16, 2025, and individuals are urged to review the process ahead of that date to ensure they are prepared to meet all necessary criteria.
Firearm registration?	No	No		
Assault weapon law?	Yes	Yes	HB 450	Effective June 30, 2022, the production, sale, transfer, receipt, and possession of firearms deemed as assault weapons are prohibited. State law bans numerous specifically named semi-automatic centerfire rifles, semi-automatic shotguns, and semi-automatic pistols. The law also bans "copycat" assault weapons, which are defined as being a firearm that while not specifically listed as a banned assault weapon, is either a semi-automatic centerfire rifle, semi-automatic shotgun, or semi-automatic pistol with one or more specific banned cosmetic features.
Magazine capacity restriction?	Yes	Yes	SB 66	Effective August 29, 2022, the production, sale, purchase, receipt, transfer, and possession of magazines capable of holding more than 17 rounds is prohibited. Active and retired law enforcement officers, members of the United States Armed Forces, and concealed-carry permit holders are exempt from the ban. .22 Caliber tubular magazines are also exempt from the ban.
Owner license required?	No	No		
Permit required for concealed carry?	N/A	Yes	11 Del.C. § 1441	Delaware is de jure a "may issue" state for concealed carry, but historically and in light of the Supreme Court's decision in New York State Rifle & Pistol Association, Inc. v. Bruen, is shall-issue in practice. Permits are generally issued to all applicants not barred from owning a firearm.
Permit required for open carry?	No	No		Open carry without a permit is generally lawful. A 2014 Delaware Supreme Court ruling recognized that open carry was a long-standing fundamental right, and could only be prohibited by local ordinances in effect prior to July 4, 1985. The city of Dover formerly required a permit from the police chief for a state concealed permit to open carry, but this was repealed in October 2015 in accordance with the ruling.
Stand Your Ground	No	No		A person is allowed to defend themselves or others in their home or workplace. While deadly force is allowed, it is only to be used when all other options have been exhausted, and the person feels they are in immediate danger. However, When a person is outside their home or workplace, deadly force to defend themselves may be illegal due to the fact there is a duty to retreat before deadly force is used.
State preemption of local restrictions?	Yes*	Yes*	22 Del.C § 111	Municipalities may regulate only the discharge of firearms and the possession of firearms within police stations and municipal buildings, unless the ordinance was in effect prior to July 4, 1985.
NFA weapons restricted?	Yes	Yes		SBRs and AOWs are legal. The city of Wilmington prohibits possession of SBRs within city limits. Machine guns, suppressors, Destructive Devices and SBS are prohibited for civilians.
Peaceable Journey laws?	No	No		Federal rules observed.
Background checks required for private sales?	Yes	Yes	147th General Assembly: Chapter 20	Private party transfers of firearms to persons other than family members must be conducted through a licensed dealer, who is required by federal law to conduct a background check and keep a record of the sale. A transfer to a person who possesses a valid License to Carry a Concealed Deadly Weapon is exempt from this requirement.
Red flag law?	Yes	Yes	House Bill 302 (2018)	If a mental health professional deems that a person is a danger to themselves or to others, the police may get a court order to temporarily seize that person's firearms.

== District of Columbia ==
Subject / law	Long guns	Handguns	Relevant statutes	Notes
Permit required to purchase?	Yes	Yes		The firearm registration process also serves as a permitting process. Purchases by DC residents may only be made through a federally licensed dealer ("FFL"), and firearms purchased through an FFL can only be physically delivered to the purchaser after MPD approves the purchase by issuing a firearm registration certificate.
Owner license required?	Yes	Yes		The firearm registration process also serves as a licensing process. In the case of self-manufactured firearms, DC residents have 5 business days to file for a registration certificate after completing the self-manufacture of a firearm.
Firearm registration?	Yes	Yes		All firearms (except certain black powder firearms) must be registered with the Metropolitan Police Department as soon as they are brought into the District; for new purchases the registration must issue prior to the owner taking possession. An NCIC background check, fingerprinting, proof of address, and online training are required.
License required for concealed carry?	N/A	Yes		The Metropolitan Police Department shall issue a Concealed Pistol License to a qualified applicant. Only registered pistols may be carried. Nonresidents must register a pistol with MPD in order to apply for a Concealed Pistol License.
Open carry allowed?	No	No		Open carry is prohibited.
Assault weapon law?	Yes	Yes		Law enforcement evaluates each firearm application on a case-by-case basis to ensure that the firearm is free of certain enumerated “assault” features before approving the firearm registration application.
Magazine capacity restriction?	Yes	Yes		Possession of magazines capable of accepting or "readily restored or converted to accept" more than 10 rounds is prohibited.
NFA weapons restricted?	Yes	Yes		Possession of machine guns, short barreled shotguns, and silencers is prohibited; possession of short barreled rifles is not specifically prohibited but short barreled rifles cannot be registered.
Peaceable journey laws?	No	No		Federal law (FOPA) applies.
Background checks required for private sales?	Yes	Yes	DC Code §7–2505.02	Private party firearm transfers must be conducted through a licensed dealer, who is required by federal law to conduct a background check and keep a record of the sale. As a result of this and applicable federal law, all handgun transfers to DC residents must be conducted by FFLs located inside the District of Columbia. Long guns (shotguns and rifles) may be transferred to DC residents by FFLs located in other states, although DC law requires that those FFLs comply with DC law. Sales made by DC firearms owners to purchasers in other states need only conform to that state's transfer laws, although federal law requires that such transfers be facilitated through an FFL.
Waiting period?	Yes	Yes		After purchasing a firearm, the buyer must receive a registration certificate from the police department before taking possession of the gun, a process which can take up to 90 days. Officially, however, the minimum waiting period is ten days.
Red flag law?	Yes	Yes		
Duty to inform?	Yes	Yes		

== Florida ==
Subject / law	Long guns	Handguns	Relevant statutes	Notes
State permit required to purchase?	No	No		
Waiting period?	Yes	Yes	Fla. Const. Article VIII § 5(b); Fla. Stat. § 790.0655	The mandatory waiting period is 3 days, excluding weekends and legal holidays, or expires upon the completion of the records checks, whichever occurs later. Individual counties can require a waiting period of up to five days. This requirement is waived for holders of a Florida Concealed Weapon license.
Firearm registration?	No	No	Fla. Stat. § 790.335	
Assault weapon law?	No	No		
Magazine capacity restriction?	No	No		
Owner license required?	No	No		
Red Flag law?	Yes	Yes	Fla. Stat. § 790.401	The police can get judicial approval to confiscate, for up to a year, the firearms of a person deemed a danger to themselves or others.
Permit required for concealed carry?	N/A	No	Fla. Stat. § 790.01	
Permit required for open carry?	No	No	Fla. Stat. § 790.25(3)	Florida's open carry ban was declared unconstitutional by Florida First District Court of Appeal on 10 September 2025. Florida Governor Ron DeSantis and Attorney General James Uthmeier welcomed the ruling and ordered law enforcement officers to no longer enforce the ban, effectively making Florida an open carry state. Open carry is now allowed without a permit. Local restrictions preempted.
Castle Doctrine/Stand Your Ground law?	Yes	Yes		
State preemption of local restrictions?	Yes	Yes	Fla. Stat. § 790.33	
NFA weapons restricted?	No	No	Fla. Stat. § 790.161; Fla. Stat. § 790.222	
Peaceable Journey laws?	No	No		
Background checks required for private sales?	No	No		
Purchase age restriction?	Yes	Yes	Fla. Stat. § 790.065(13)	The sale or transfer of a firearm to a person younger than 21 years of age may not be made or facilitated by a licensed importer, licensed manufacturer, or licensed dealer. The law restricts all long guns to those over 18 years old

== Georgia ==
Subject / law	Long guns	Handguns	Relevant statutes	Notes
State permit required to purchase?	No	No		
Firearm registration?	No	No		
Assault weapon law?	No	No		
Magazine capacity restriction?	No	No		
Owner license required?	No	No		
Permit required for concealed carry?	N/A	No	O.C.G.A. § 16-11-126; O.C.G.A. § 16-11-129	Georgia is a "shall issue" for Georgia residents 21 years or older. Permitless concealed carry took effect on April 12, 2022.
Permit required for open carry?	No	No	O.C.G.A. § 16-11-126; O.C.G.A. § 16-11-129	Georgia is a "shall issue" for Georgia residents 21 years or older. Permitless open carry took effect on April 12, 2022.
Castle Doctrine/Stand Your Ground law?	Yes	Yes	O.C.G.A. § 16-3-23.1	
State preemption of local restrictions?	Yes	Yes	O.C.G.A. § 16-11-173	
NFA weapons restricted?	No	No	O.C.G.A. §§ 16-11-120 to 16-11-125	
Peaceable Journey laws?	No	No		
Background checks required for private sales?	No	No		

== Hawaii ==
Subject / law	Long guns	Handguns	Relevant statutes	Notes
State permit required to purchase?	Yes	Yes	§134-2	Must be 21 years old to acquire a permit to purchase.
Firearm registration?	Yes	Yes	HRS 0134-0003	Must be registered with county police chief within 5 days of purchase or arrival to Hawaii. Registration not required for black powder and pre-1899 firearms. May not bring firearm into the state if under 21.
Assault weapon law?	No	Yes		Law bans assault pistols with two or more banned features. Does not apply to rifles or shotguns with a barrel length greater than 16 inches (41 cm)
Magazine capacity restriction?	No	Yes	HRS134-8(c) HRS134-11(3)	Any magazine with a capacity of more than 10 rounds that can be inserted into a pistol is prohibited. Members of organizations are exempt from the pistol magazine limit at places of target shooting.
Owner license required?	No	No		No license required to own any firearms in Hawaii, but all firearms, including those brought into the state by new residents, must be registered.
Permit required for concealed carry?	N/A	Yes	HRS 0134-0009	Permits are granted on a shall issue basis. While Hawaii has a may-issue law and historically approved almost no concealed carry permit applications, its law has been permanently enjoined since the Supreme Court's decision in NYSPRA v. Bruen on June 23, 2022. This ruling held that the Second Amendment protects an individual's right to carry a handgun outside the home, abrogating Hawaii's may-issue concealed carry law. Prior to the ruling, the chief of police in each county could grant a permit "in an exceptional case, when an applicant shows reason to fear injury to the applicant's person or property." On July 7, 2022, the state's attorney general formally acknowledged that the licensing officials could no longer enforce this clause in light of the Bruen decision.
Permit required for open carry?	Yes	Yes		By law, Hawaii is a Licensed Open Carry State, but since licenses are rarely issued, the state is Non-Permissive for open carry in practice. The chief of police may grant a permit "Where the urgency or the need has been sufficiently indicated" provided that the person "is engaged in the protection of life and property." In practice, Hawaii is "No-Issue," as issuing authorities rarely or never approve applications for permits. On July 24, 2018, the Ninth Circuit Court of Appeals ruled that Hawaii's laws restricting open carry are unconstitutional. That ruling was vacated on February 8, 2019, and the case was reheard en banc on September 24, 2020. On March 24, 2021, the en banc court ruled that Hawaii's restrictions on the open carrying of firearms are outside the historical scope of the Second Amendment and therefore the laws restricting open carry are constitutional. No laws against open carrying long guns. The Bruen decision has left the no issuance of open carry licenses in a grey area at this point.
State preemption of local restrictions?	Yes	Yes		Municipalities may enact and enforce local regulations only if they are identical to, and provide the same penalty as, state law.
NFA weapons restricted?	Yes	Yes		Machine guns, short barreled rifles, short barreled shotguns, and silencers/suppressors are prohibited from the average citizen. Certain Destructive Devices and AOWs are allowed with proper tax stamp and NFA paperwork from the ATF.
Peaceable journey laws?	No	No	None	Federal laws observed.
Background checks required for private sales?	Yes	Yes	HRS §134-2	A person who wants to purchase a handgun or long gun must obtain a permit to acquire the ownership of a firearm, which requires a background check of the applicant.
Red flag law?	Yes	Yes		Hawaii passed a red flag law in late June 2019.
Duty to inform?	Yes	Yes		

== Idaho ==
Subject / law	Long guns	Handguns	Relevant statutes	Notes
State permit required to purchase?	No	No		
Firearm registration?	No	No		
Semi-automatic weapon law?	No	No		
Magazine capacity restriction?	No	No		
Owner license required?	No	No		
Permit required for concealed carry?	N/A	No	I.C. § 18-3302; I.C. § 18-3302K	Idaho is a "shall issue" state for citizens and lawful permanent residents who are 18 years or older. Regular and Enhanced permits are issued. Permitless carry took effect on July 1, 2016.
Permit required for open carry?	No	No	I.C. § 18-3302	May carry openly without permit.
Castle Doctrine/Stand Your Ground law?	Yes	Yes	I.C. § 19-202A	
State preemption of local restrictions?	Yes	Yes	I.C. § 18-3302J	
NFA weapons restricted?	No	No		
Peaceable Journey laws?	No	No		
Background checks required for private sales?	No	No		

== Illinois ==
Subject / law	Long guns	Handguns	Relevant statutes	Notes
State permit required to purchase?	Yes	Yes	430 ILCS 65	FOID (Firearm Owner's Identification) card required.
Owner permit required?	Yes	Yes	430 ILCS 65	FOID card required.
Firearm registration?	Partial	Partial	720 ILCS 5/24-1.9	Firearms legally defined as assault weapons possessed within Illinois before January 10, 2023, must have been registered with the state police before January 1, 2024.
License required for concealed carry?	N/A	Yes	430 ILCS 66	Shall-issue with limited discretion. Concealed carry licenses are issued by the state police. Licenses issued by other states are not recognized (except for vehicle carry), but nonresidents from states with "substantially similar" licensing requirements can apply for an Illinois nonresident license.
Open carry allowed?	No	No	720 ILCS 5/24-1	
Vehicle carry allowed?	No	Yes	430 ILCS 66	An Illinois concealed carry license is required for Illinois residents. Non-residents may carry in a vehicle if they are eligible to carry in their home state. If their home state issues licenses or permits (even if that state allows permitless carry), a license or permit is required.
State preemption of local restrictions?	Partial	Partial	430 ILCS 66	Preemption for the regulation and transportation of handguns and handgun ammunition. Preemption for laws regulating assault weapons, unless enacted before July 20, 2013.
Assault weapon law?	Yes	Yes	720 ILCS 5/24-1.9	The sale of firearms defined as assault weapons is prohibited as of January 10, 2023. Existing assault weapons are grandfathered in if registered with the state police by January 1, 2024. These restrictions are being challenged in various state and federal courts. Some local governments have banned the possession of assault weapons, prior to the preemption deadline of July 20, 2013.
Magazine capacity restriction?	Yes	Yes	720 ILCS 5/24-1.9	Limit of 10 rounds for long guns and 15 rounds for handguns as of January 10, 2023. These restrictions are being challenged in various state and federal courts. Some local governments have enacted additional restrictions.
NFA weapons restricted?	Yes	Yes	720 ILCS 5/24-1; 720 ILCS 5/24-2	Automatic firearms, short-barreled shotguns, and suppressors prohibited. Short-barreled rifles allowed only for Curios and Relics license holders or members of a bona fide military reenactment group. AOW (Any Other Weapon) and large-bore DD (Destructive Device) allowed with proper approval and tax stamp from ATF.
Castle doctrine / stand your ground laws?	Partial	Partial	720 ILCS 5	Illinois has no stand-your-ground law, however there is also no duty to retreat. The use of force is justified when a person reasonably believes that it is necessary "to prevent imminent death or great bodily harm to himself or another, or the commission of a forcible felony." There are some additional protections for defense against unlawful entry into a dwelling.
Peaceable journey laws?	Partial	Yes	430 ILCS 66	Illinois has state preemption for the transportation of handguns and handgun ammunition. Non-Illinois residents are granted a limited exception to lawfully carry a concealed firearm within a vehicle if they are eligible to carry a firearm in public under the laws of their own state, "as evidenced by the possession of a concealed carry license or permit issued by his or her state of residence." Non-residents who are permitted to possess a firearm in their own state are not required to have a FOID card. Some localities have banned the possession of assault weapons.
Background checks required for private sales?	Yes	Yes	430 ILCS 65	Private sales of firearms must be done through a gun dealer with a Federal Firearms License (FFL).
Red flag law?	Yes	Yes	430 ILCS 65; 430 ILCS 67	Family members, police, or state's attorneys can petition a judge to issue an order to confiscate the firearms of a person deemed an immediate and present danger to themselves or others. The person's firearms must be returned to them within one year unless the court finds grounds to renew the suspension. Law enforcement officers, school administrators, physicians, and mental health professionals can file a clear and present danger report with the Department of Human Services and Illinois State Police, which will revoke the FOID card of a person who communicates a serious threat of physical violence or demonstrates threatening physical or verbal behavior. Subjects of such reports must undergo a psychological evaluation to prove they are not a danger to themselves or others if they wish to obtain a FOID card or to have a revoked FOID card reinstated.
Waiting period?	Yes	Yes	720 ILCS 5/24-3	After purchasing a firearm, the waiting period before the buyer can take possession is 72 hours.
"Ghost guns" banned?	Yes	Yes	720 ILCS 5/24-1	All firearms are required to have a serial number.
Minimum age to purchase or possess?	No	Yes	720 ILCS 5/24-3	Illinois prohibits any person under age 18 from possessing a handgun. (Federal law prohibits persons under 18 from purchasing long guns, and persons under 21 from purchasing handguns.)

== Indiana ==
Subject / law	Long guns	Handguns	Relevant statutes	Notes
State permit required to purchase?	No	No		
Firearm registration?	No	No		
Assault weapon law?	No	No		
Magazine capacity restriction?	No	No		
Owner license required?	No	No		
Red Flag law?	Yes	Yes	IC 35-47-14-6	
Permit required for concealed carry?	N/A	No	IC 35-47-2-1; IC 35-47-2-1.5; IC 35-47-2-3	Indiana is a "shall issue" state for citizens and lawful permanent residents who are 18 years or older. Permitless concealed carry took effect on July 1, 2022, for residents and non-residents 18 or older
Permit required for open carry?	No	No	IC 35-47-2-1; IC 35-47-2-3	Permitless open carry took effect on July 1, 2022, for residents and non-residents 18 or older. Carry of long guns is generally permitted. On May 9, 2017, the Indiana Supreme Court ruled that detaining an individual based solely upon their possession of a handgun (in order to verify that they are licensed) violates the Fourth Amendment absent any other reasonable articulable suspicion of a crime being committed.
Castle Doctrine/Stand Your Ground law?	Yes	Yes	IC 35-41-3-2	
State preemption of local restrictions?	Yes	Yes	IC 35-47-11.1-2	
NFA weapons restricted?	No	No		
Shall certify?	Yes	Yes	IC 35-47-8.5-2	Shall certify within 15 days.
Peaceable Journey laws?	No	No		
Background checks required for private sales?	No	No		

== Iowa ==
Subject / law	Long guns	Handguns	Relevant statutes	Notes
State permit required to purchase?	No	No	724.15	Iowa law provides for a permit to acquire pistols or revolvers but it is not required to purchase firearms. The permit has a three-day waiting period before taking effect.
Firearm registration?	No	No	724.11	"Neither the sheriff nor the commissioner shall require an applicant for a permit to carry weapons to provide information identifying a particular weapon in the application including the make, model, or serial number of the weapon or any ammunition used in that particular weapon."
Assault weapon law?	No	No		
Magazine capacity restriction?	No	No		
Owner license required?	No	No		
Permit required for concealed carry?	N/A	No	724.5; 724.7	Iowa is a "shall issue" state for citizens and lawful permanent residents who are 21 years or older. Permitless carry took effect on July 1, 2021.
Permit required for open carry?	No	No	724.5	May carry openly without permit.
Castle Doctrine?	Yes	Yes	704; 707.6	Civil immunity for use of "reasonable force" in self defense
Stand Your Ground law?	Yes	Yes	704; 707.6	"A person who is not engaged in illegal activity has no duty to retreat from any place where the person is lawfully present before using force..."
State preemption of local restrictions?	Yes	Yes	724.28	"A political subdivision of the state shall not enact an ordinance, motion, resolution, policy, or amendment regulating the ownership, possession, carrying, legal transfer, lawful transportation, modification, registration, or licensing of firearms, firearms attachments, or other weapons when the ownership, possession, carrying, transfer, transportation, or modification is otherwise lawful under the laws of this state."
NFA weapons restricted?	Yes	Yes	724.1	Machine guns and destructive devices illegal. Suppressors legal as of March 31, 2016. Short barreled rifles and shotguns legal as of April 13, 2017.
Shall certify?	Yes	Yes	724.1A	Shall certify within 30 days (suppressors only).
Peaceable Journey laws?	No	No		
Background checks required for private sales?	No	No		

== Kansas ==
Subject / law	Long guns	Handguns	Relevant statutes	Notes
State permit required to purchase?	No	No		
Firearm registration?	No	No		
Assault weapon law?	No	No		
Magazine capacity restriction?	No	No		
Owner license required?	No	No		
Permit required for concealed carry?	N/A	No	K.S.A. § 21-6302; K.S.A. § 75-7c03(a)	Kansas is a "shall issue" state for citizens and lawful permanent residents who are 18 years or older. Regular permits are issued to those 21 or older, and Provisional permits are issued to those 18 to 21. Permitless carry took effect on July 1, 2015.
Permit required for open carry?	No	No	K.S.A. § 75-7c03(a)	May carry openly without permit.
Castle Doctrine/Stand Your Ground law?	Yes	Yes	K.S.A. § 21-5222	
State preemption of local restrictions?	Yes	Yes	K.S.A. § 12-16,124; K.S.A. § 75-7c17	
NFA weapons restricted?	No	No	K.S.A. §§ 50-1201 to 50-1211	The Second Amendment Protection Act prohibits Kansas law enforcement from enforcing the NFA if a personal firearm, a firearm accessory, or ammunition is owned or manufactured commercially or privately in Kansas and remains within the borders of Kansas. A firearm manufactured in Kansas must have the words "made in Kansas" clearly stamped on a central metallic part, such as the receiver or frame. Federal enforcement is still possible.
Shall certify?	Yes	Yes	K.S.A. § 48-1906	Shall certify within 15 days.
Peaceable Journey laws?	No	No		
Background checks required for private sales?	No	No		

== Kentucky ==
Subject / law	Long guns	Handguns	Relevant statutes	Notes
State permit required to purchase?	No	No		
Firearm registration?	No	No		
Assault weapon law?	No	No		
Magazine capacity restriction?	No	No		
Owner license required?	No	No		
Permit required for concealed carry?	N/A	No	KRS § 237.109; KRS § 237.110	Kentucky is a "shall issue" state for citizens and lawful permanent residents who are 21 years or older. Permitless carry took effect on June 26, 2019.
Permit required for open carry?	No	No		May carry openly without permit.
Castle Doctrine/Stand Your Ground law?	Yes	Yes	KRS § 503.050	
State preemption of local restrictions?	Yes	Yes	KRS § 65.870; KRS § 237.115	No locality "may occupy any part of the field of regulation of the manufacture, sale, purchase, taxation, transfer, ownership, possession, carrying, storage, or transportation of firearms, ammunition, components of firearms, components of ammunition, firearms accessories, or combination thereof." The following entities can restrict concealed carry, per law: Postsecondary educational institutions; Any unit of government within the state in buildings that it owns, leases, or occupies – however, concealed carry is allowed in highway rest areas, public housing, and private dwellings
NFA weapons restricted?	No	No		
Shall certify?	Yes	Yes	KRS § 237.075	Shall certify within 15 days.
Peaceable Journey laws?	No	No		
Background checks required for private sales?	No	No		

== Louisiana ==
Subject / law	Long guns	Handguns	Relevant statutes	Notes
State permit required to purchase?	No	No		
Firearm registration?	No	No		
Assault weapon law?	No	No		
Magazine capacity restriction?	No	No		
Owner license required?	No	No		
Permit required for concealed carry?	N/A	No	La. R.S. 40:95; La. R.S. 40:1379.3	Louisiana is a "shall issue" state for citizens and lawful permanent residents who are 21+.: Effective July 4, 2024, adults 18+ will no longer be required to have a permit to carry a concealed weapon.
Permit required for open carry?	No	No		May carry openly without a permit.
Castle Doctrine/Stand Your Ground law?	Yes	Yes	La. R.S. 14:19	
State preemption of local restrictions?	Yes	Yes	La. R.S. 40:1796	Full firearm and bladed weapon preemption.
NFA weapons restricted?	No	No		
Peaceable Journey laws?	No	No		
Background checks required for private sales?	No	No		
Duty to inform?	No	Yes	La. R.S. 40:1379.3	

== Maine ==
Subject / law	Long guns	Handguns	Relevant statutes	Notes
State permit required to purchase?	No	No		
Firearm registration?	No	No	25 M.R.S. § 2014	
Assault weapon law?	No	No		
Magazine capacity restriction?	No	No		
Owner license required?	No	No		
Red flag law?	Yes	Yes	34-B M.R.S. § 3862-A	
Permit required for concealed carry?	N/A	No	25 M.R.S. § 2001-A; 25 M.R.S. § 2003	Maine is a "shall issue" state for citizens and lawful permanent residents who are 18 years or older. Permitless carry took effect on October 12, 2015.
Permit required for open carry?	No	No		May carry openly without permit, except in state parks and some other locations.
Castle Doctrine/Stand Your Ground law?	No	No	17-A M.R.S. § 108	
State preemption of local restrictions?	Yes	Yes	25 M.R.S. § 2011	
NFA weapons restricted?	No	No		
Shall certify?	Yes	Yes	25 M.R.S. § 2013	Shall certify within 15 days.
Peaceable Journey laws?	No	No		
Background checks required for private sales?	Some	Some		Required if the sales are at gun shows or the guns were advertised for sale.
Duty to inform?	No	Yes	25 M.R.S. § 2003-A	Only when carrying without a permit.

== Maryland ==
Subject / law	Long guns	Handguns	Relevant statutes	Notes
State permit required to purchase?	No	Yes	Md Public Safety Article Section 5-117.1	A Handgun Qualification License is required, unless exempted (Active Duty/Retired Military with identification cards, Active/Retired Law Enforcement with department credentials, Federal Firearms Licensees); training is required, unless exempted; fingerprints are required; background checks are required; does not invalidate the requirement to perform a comprehensive background check for every handgun purchase transaction.
Firearm registration?	No	Yes		The state police maintain a permanent record of all handgun transfers. Automatic weapons must be registered with the state police.
Owner license required?	No	No		
Permit required for concealed carry?	N/A	Yes		Maryland is a de jure "may issue" state for concealed carry, but in light of the Supreme Court's decision in New York State Rifle & Pistol Association, Inc. v. Bruen, Governor Larry Hogan directed law enforcement to cease enforcement of the "good and substantial reason" requirement to obtain a concealed carry permit. As a result, Maryland is de facto a "shall issue" state.
Permit required for open carry?	No	Yes		Open carry is permitted with a carry license, but is not generally practiced except by uniformed private security officers. Though this is subjective with the issuance of shall-issue permits now. Long guns and antique handguns may be carried openly without a license.
State preemption of local restrictions?	Yes	Yes		Maryland has state preemption for most but not all firearm laws.
"Assault weapon" law?	Yes	Yes	Md Criminal Law Article Section 4-303; Firearms Safety Act of 2013	Certain models of firearms are banned as "assault pistols" and "assault long guns". It is illegal to possess an "assault weapon" or a copycat weapon with two or more specified features (folding stock, grenade/flare launcher, flash suppressor) unless owned before 10/1/2013, or received through inheritance from a lawful possessor and not otherwise forbidden to possess. Some local counties have adopted Second Amendment sanctuary resolutions in opposition to assault weapon laws.
Magazine capacity restriction?	Yes	Yes		Illegal to purchase, sell or manufacture magazines with a capacity of greater than 10 rounds within Maryland. However, possession of magazines greater than 10 rounds is legal if purchased out of state. These may not, however, be transferred to a subsequent owner unless done so outside the state of Maryland.
NFA weapons restricted?	No	No		Automatic firearms, SBSs, and SBRs must be owned in compliance with federal law. Law is silent in regards to DDs, suppressors, and AOWs.
Background checks required for private sales?	Yes	Yes	GAM Public Safety, §5-124	All private transfers of firearms must be processed through a licensed dealer or designated law enforcement agency which must conduct a background check on the buyer.
Red flag law?	Yes	Yes		

== Massachusetts ==
Note: this section does not yet reflect changes per An Act Modernizing Firearms Laws (H.4885).

Subject / law	Long guns	Handguns	Relevant statutes	Notes
State permit required to purchase?	Yes	Yes	MA Ch. 140 Sec. 129C, Sec. 131 3/4	Firearms Identification Card (FID) or License to Carry Firearms (LTC) required, which are normally issued by local police departments. The state's Firearms Records Bureau handles applications for non-resident licenses to carry, and resident alien permits. Historically, some issuing authorities (notably the Boston Police Department) required an applicant to justify the need for a firearm—see additional discussion below regarding "shall issue". Federal Firearms License (FFL) holders may only sell handguns that appear on one of the state's "approved firearms rosters", although this does not prohibit LTC holders from lawfully possessing handguns not on the rosters.
Firearm registration?	No	No	MA Ch. 140 Sec. 128A	Although registration is not specifically required by law, transfers of firearm ownership are required to be recorded with the Massachusetts Executive Office of Public Safety and Security (EOPSS): by the seller if in state, or by the buyer if out of state. The Massachusetts EOPSS also provides the option to register a firearm, although, other than obtaining a firearm from out of state (a transfer of ownership), this is not required by law.
Owner license required?	Yes	Yes	MA Ch. 140 Sec. 129C	Firearms Identification Card (FID) or License to Carry Firearms (LTC) required.
License required for concealed carry?	Yes	Yes	MA Ch. 140 Sec. 131	License to Carry Firearms (LTC) required. Massachusetts is a de facto "shall issue" state for carry since the Supreme Court's decision in New York State Rifle & Pistol Association, Inc. v. Bruen held "may issue" regimes unconstitutional. The issuing authority must provide written explanation for the denial of any application, which is subject to appeal. The issuing authority is the local police chief for most jurisdictions, who issues carry licenses based on an applicant's suitability and compliance with background check and training requirements. Permits are valid statewide, provided the license-holder complies with restrictions (if any) imposed by the issuing authority.
License required for open carry?	Yes	Yes		License to Carry Firearms (LTC) required. Note than an individual who can lawfully carry firearms does not have to conceal a firearm in public. Moreover, in 2013, the Massachusetts Supreme Judicial Court ruled (FRB v. Simkin) that such a person is not responsible for alarm caused by licensed carry of a handgun, and that a permit cannot be revoked for suitability purposes under these circumstances. If police demand to see the permit, it must be produced, per G.L. c. 140, § 129C. Failure to produce a LTC upon demand by law enforcement is probable cause for arrest. *G.L. c. 140, § 129C has been removed as of October, 2024.
State preemption of local restrictions?	No	No		There is limited preemption for some laws.
Assault weapon law?	Yes	Yes	MA Ch. 140 Sec. 121	Massachusetts statute lists specific firearms that are deemed assault weapons, and also incorporates the definition of an assault weapon per "18 U.S.C. section 921(a)(30) as appearing in such section on September 13, 1994", which is a two-point "banned features" system. Firearms listed as assault weapons or failing the two-point system are prohibited, unless lawfully owned on or prior to September 13, 1994. Firearms that do not meet the definition of an assault weapon are legal to purchase with an LTC, or in some cases an FID, as long as applicable magazine capacity restrictions are followed.
Magazine capacity restriction?	Yes	Yes	MA Ch. 140 Sec. 121	Unlawful to possess magazines of over 10 rounds capacity. "Pre-ban" magazines (manufactured before September 13, 1994) are exempt from this restriction.
NFA weapons restricted?	Yes	Yes	MA Ch. 140 Sec. 131	Suppressors are restricted only for law enforcement or licensed manufacturers. Some destructive devices (DD) are banned at the state level, while others are banned at a local level; they can be completely illegal or legal, depending on what town one lives in. Short-barreled rifles (SBR), short barrel shotguns (SBS), and any other weapon (AOW) are allowed with proper approval from the Bureau of Alcohol, Tobacco, Firearms and Explosives (ATF). To lawfully possess a machine gun, a machine gun license is required.
Background checks required for private sales?	Yes	Yes	MA Ch. 140 Sec. 128A	The seller must verify the buyer's FID or LTC with the state's Department of Criminal Justice Information Services (CJIS), which is "conducted over a real time web portal" developed by CJIS.
Red flag law?	Yes	Yes	MA Ch. 140 Sec. 131R	A judge may issue an extreme risk protection order (ERPO) to temporarily confiscate the firearms of a person who appears to be at risk of harming themselves or another person.

== Michigan ==
Subject / law	Long guns	Handguns	Relevant statutes	Notes
State permit required to purchase?	Partial	Yes	MCL § 28.422	A license to purchase (issued by a police department) or a Michigan-issued Concealed Pistol License (CPL) is required to purchase a long gun (private sales only) or a handgun (both private sales and dealer sales). Applicants must undergo a background check to receive a license to purchase or a CPL.
Firearm registration?	No	Yes	MCL § 28.432	Some handgun sales are required to be registered to local law enforcement. There are several exceptions, including, but not limited to, police and United States citizens holding a concealed carry permit from another state.
Assault weapon law?	No	No		
Magazine capacity restriction?	No	No		
Owner license required?	No	No		
Permit required for concealed carry?	N/A	Yes	MCL § 28.425b MCL § 750.227	Michigan is a "shall issue" state for citizens and lawful permanent residents who are 21 years or older.
Permit required for open carry?	No	No	MCL § 750.227	May carry openly without permit, except Concealed Pistol License required to carry in a vehicle.
Castle Doctrine/Stand Your Ground law?	Yes	Yes	MCL § 780.951	
State preemption of local restrictions?	Yes	Yes	MCL § 123.1102	
NFA weapons restricted?	No	No		
Peaceable Journey laws?	Yes	Yes	MCL § 750.231a	
Background checks required for private sales?	Yes	Yes	MCL § 28.422a	A license to purchase a firearm (issued by a police department) or a Michigan-issued Concealed Pistol License (CPL) is required to purchase a long gun (private sales only) or a handgun (both private sales and dealer sales). Applicants must undergo a background check to receive either a license to purchase a firearm or a CPL.
Duty to inform?	No	Yes	MCL § 28.425f	

== Minnesota ==
Subject / law	Long guns	Handguns	Relevant statutes	Notes
State permit required to purchase?	No*	Yes	§624.7131	Permit to purchase required to transfer/purchase long guns with a pistol grip and handguns through FFL dealers. A permit to carry also acts as a permit to purchase for Minnesota residents. Traditional rifles and shotguns may be purchased without a permit.
Firearm registration?	No	No		
Assault-style weapon law?	Yes	Yes	§624.7131	Persons 18 and older may purchase assault-style weapons with a permit to purchase (or permit to carry for persons 21 and older).
Magazine Capacity Restriction?	No	No		
Owner license required?	No	No		
Permit required for concealed carry?	N/A	Yes	§624.714	Shall Issue. Minnesota Permit to Carry a Pistol required to carry handguns. Concealment is permitted but not required.
Permit required for open carry?	Yes	Yes	§624.7181	Whoever carries a BB gun, rifle, or shotgun on or about the person in a public place is guilty of a gross misdemeanor. A person under the age of 21 who carries a semiautomatic military-style assault weapon on or about their person in public place is guilty of a felony. However, one may carry a pistol or a long gun openly with permit to carry a pistol because, the law states that the prohibition on carrying does not include the carrying of a BB gun, rifle, or shotgun by a person who has a permit under section 624.714.
State Preemption of local restrictions?	Yes	Yes	§471.633	Municipalities may regulate the discharge of firearms within their borders.
NFA weapons restricted?	Yes	Yes	§609.67	Machine guns and short-barreled shotguns, unless designated Curios & Relics, are prohibited in most cases. Some destructive devices are prohibited in most cases. Sound suppressors and short barreled rifles are legal.
Peaceable Journey laws?	Yes	Yes	§97B.045 §624.714, Subd. 9	Any legally possessed gun may be transported in a motor vehicle, provided it is unloaded and cased.
Background checks required for private sales?	No*	Yes	https://www.revisor.mn.gov/statutes/cite/624.7132	Long guns also require a background check if equipped with a pistol grip. As explained in subdivision 2, a background check for a private sale can be more thorough than the background check for a sale through a FFL holder.

== Mississippi ==
Subject / law	Long guns	Handguns	Relevant statutes	Notes
State permit required to purchase?	No	No		
Firearm registration?	No	No		
Assault weapon law?	No	No		
Magazine capacity restriction?	No	No		
Owner license required?	No	No		
Permit required for concealed carry?	N/A	No	Miss. Code Ann. § 45-9-101; Miss. Code Ann. § 95-3-1; Miss. Code Ann. § 97-37-1; Miss. Code Ann. § 97-37-7(2)	Mississippi is a "shall issue" state for citizens and lawful permanent residents who are 21 years or older. Regular and Enhanced permits are issued. Enhanced permits are issued to those who complete a training course. Permitless carry took effect on April 15, 2016, and applies to the carry of handguns in "belt and shoulder holsters and sheaths." Some forms of concealed carry still require a permit (e.g., without a holster, or in an ankle holster). Enhanced concealed carry permits allow for carrying in all areas except for any police, sheriff or state highway patrol station; any detention facility, prison or jail; courtrooms during a judicial proceeding; and, any "place of nuisance".
Permit required for open carry?	No	No	Miss. Code Ann. § 45-9-101(14); Miss. Code Ann. § 97-37-1(4)	May carry openly without permit. Handguns must be carried in a "a sheath, belt holster or shoulder holster".
Castle Doctrine/Stand Your Ground law?	Yes	Yes	Miss. Code Ann. § 97-3-15	
State preemption of local restrictions?	Yes	Yes	Miss. Code Ann. § 45-9-51; Miss. Code Ann. § 45-9-53	"...no county or municipality may adopt any ordinance that restricts the possession, carrying, transportation, sale, transfer or ownership of firearms or ammunition or their components." However, local governments may regulate the discharge of firearms, the carrying of firearms at a public park or public meeting, or the use of firearms in cases of insurrection, riots, and natural disasters.
NFA weapons restricted?	No	No		
Peaceable Journey laws?	No	No		
Background checks required for private sales?	No	No		

== Missouri ==
Subject / law	Long guns	Handguns	Relevant statutes	Notes
State permit required to purchase?	No	No		
Firearm registration?	No	No		
Assault weapon law?	No	No		
Magazine capacity restriction?	No	No		
Owner license required?	No	No		
Permit required for concealed carry?	No	No	RSMo 571.030	Missouri is a "shall issue" state for citizens and lawful permanent residents who are 19 years or older. Permitless carry took effect on January 1, 2017.
Permit required for open carry?	No	No	RSMo 21.750; RSMo 571.037	May carry openly without permit, except localities can pass ordinances restricting open carry. Carry permits allow holders to carry openly anywhere in the state.
Castle Doctrine/Stand Your Ground law?	Yes	Yes	RsMo 563	
State preemption of local restrictions?	Yes	Yes	RSMo 21.750	Local governments can regulate the open carry and discharge of firearms. In December 2019, St. Louis passed an ordinance forbidding the carrying of firearms in city parks, athletic fields and facilities, and recreational facilities. A lawsuit challenging the ordinance as a violation of the preemption law is expected.
NFA weapons restricted?	No	No		
Peaceable Journey laws?	Yes	Yes		
Background checks required for private sales?	No	No		

== Montana ==
Subject / law	Long guns	Handguns	Relevant statutes	Notes
State permit required to purchase?	No	No		
Firearm registration?	No	No		
Assault weapon law?	No	No		
Magazine capacity restriction?	No	No		
Owner license required?	No	No		
Permit required for concealed carry?	N/A	No	MCA § 45-8-316; MCA § 45-8-321	Montana is a "shall issue" state for citizens and lawful permanent residents who are 18 years or older. Permitless carry took effect on February 18, 2021.
Permit required for open carry?	No	No	MCA § 45-8-311	May carry openly without permit.
Castle Doctrine/Stand Your Ground law?	Yes	Yes	MCA § 45-3	
State preemption of local restrictions?	Yes	Yes	MCA § 45-8-351	Localities may regulate firearm discharge and the open or unpermitted concealed carry of weapons to a publicly owned and occupied building.
NFA weapons restricted?	No	No		
Peaceable Journey laws?	No	No		
Background checks required for private sales?	No	No		Missoula enacted a universal background check ordinance in 2016, however Attorney General Tim Fox opined that the ordinance is unlawful. In October 2018, a state judge ruled that the ordinance was lawful but the ordinance was struck down unanimously by the Montana Supreme Court on October 22, 2019.

== Nebraska ==
Subject / law	Long guns	Handguns	Relevant Statutes	Notes
State permit required to purchase?	No	Yes	Neb. Rev. Stat. § 69-2403	For handguns, a Firearm Purchase Permit (issued by the sheriff in the county of one's residence) or a Nebraska-issued Concealed Handgun Permit is required.
Firearm registration?	No	No		
Assault weapon law?	No	No		
Magazine capacity restriction?	No	No		
Owner license required?	No	No		
Permit required for concealed carry?	N/A	No	Neb. Rev. Stat. § 28-1202; Neb. Rev. Stat. § 69-2430	Nebraska is a "shall issue" state for citizens and lawful permanent residents who are 21 years or older. Permitless carry took effect on September 2 2023, 90 days after the end of the legislative session, which ended on June 1, 2023.
Permit required for open carry?	No	No		May carry openly without permit. For open carry in a vehicle, the firearm must be clearly visible.
Castle Doctrine/Stand Your Ground law?	No	No		
State preemption of local restrictions?	Yes	Yes	Neb. Rev. Stat. § 14-102; Neb. Rev. Stat. § 15-255; Neb. Rev. Stat. § 16-227; Neb. Rev. Stat. § 17-556; Neb. Rev. Stat. § 18-1703; Neb. Rev. Stat. § 69-2425	Localities may regulate firearm discharge.
NFA weapons restricted?	Yes	No	Neb. Rev. Stat. § 28-1203; Neb. Rev. Stat. § 28-1220	Destructive devices are banned.
Peaceable Journey laws?	No	No		
Background checks required for private sales?	No	Yes	Neb. Rev. Stat. § 69-2403	For handguns, a Firearm Purchase Permit (issued by the sheriff in the county of one's residence) or a Nebraska-issued Concealed Handgun Permit is required.
Duty to inform?	No	Yes	Neb. Rev. Stat. § 69-2440	
Purchase age restriction?	No	Yes	Neb. Rev. Stat. § 69-2404	In addition to federal law, state law prohibits sales of handguns to those under 21, including in private transactions.

== Nevada ==
Subject / law	Long guns	Handguns	Relevant statutes	Notes
State permit required to purchase?	No	No		
Firearm registration?	No	No		As of June 2015, Clark County no longer requires the registration of handguns. There is now state preemption for firearm registration.
Owner license required?	No	No		
Permit required for concealed carry?	N/A	Yes	NRS 202§3657 - Application and PermittingNRS 202§360 - Prohibited Persons	Nevada is a "shall issue" state for concealed carry.
Permit required for open carry?	No	No	NV Constitution Article 1 Section 11 NRS 503§165 - Carrying loaded rifle or shotgun in or on vehicle on or along public way unlawful; exceptions.	Open carry is generally permitted throughout the state. For open carry in a vehicle, the firearm may be anywhere except concealed upon the person without a concealed firearm permit. Long guns carried openly in a vehicle may not have a round chambered, but may otherwise have a loaded magazine inserted or inside them.
State preemption of local restrictions?	Yes	Yes	NRS 244§364 - County of 700,000 or moreNRS 268§418 - City of 700,000 or moreNRS 269§222 - Town of 700,000 or more	Local authorities may regulate the discharge of firearms. Handgun registration in Clark County was grandfathered in, until SB175 (signed into law June 2nd, 2015) removed the authority of the county to register handguns in Nevada.
Assault weapon law?	No	No		
Magazine Capacity Restriction?	No	No		
NFA weapons restricted?	No	No	NRS 202§275 Possession, manufacture or disposition of short-barreled rifle or short-barreled shotgunNRS 202§350 Manufacture, importation, possession or use of dangerous weapon or silencer18 USC §922(b)4 - Unlawful Transfer27 CFR §478.98 - Sales or deliveries of destructive devices and certain firearms.	Possession and ownership of an SBR, SBS, machine gun (selective-fire weapon), or silencer, all NFA items, are subject to federal purview and regulation.
Background checks required for private sales?	Yes	Yes		In November 2016, Nevada voters approved Ballot Question 1, changing the law to require background checks for private sales. Nevada Attorney General Adam Laxalt opined that the law is unenforceable. A revised version was signed into law on February 15, 2019 to fix the deficiencies of Question 1. The law is set to go into effect in January 2020. Some local counties have adopted Second Amendment sanctuary resolutions in opposition.
Red flag law?	Yes	Yes		Police may confiscate firearms from those considered a threat.

== New Hampshire ==
Subject / law	Long guns	Handguns	Relevant statutes	Notes
State permit required to purchase?	No	No	NHRS XII § 159:14	
Firearm registration?	No	No		
Assault weapon law?	No	No		
Magazine capacity restriction?	No	No		
Owner license required?	No	No		
Permit required for concealed carry?	N/A	No	NHRS XII § 159:6	New Hampshire is a "shall issue" state for residents and non-residents who are 18 years or older and is one of the few states that will issue to non-citizens living outside of the United States. Permitless carry took effect on February 22, 2017.
Permit required for open carry?	No	No	NHRS XII § 159:6; NHRS XVIII § 207:7	May carry openly without permit. Loaded long guns prohibited in motor vehicles.
Castle doctrine/stand your ground law?	Yes	Yes	NHRS LXII § 627	
State preemption of local restrictions?	Yes	Yes	NHRS XII § 159:26	"Except as otherwise specifically provided by statute, no ordinance or regulation of a political subdivision may regulate the sale, purchase, ownership, use, possession, transportation, licensing, permitting, taxation, or other matter pertaining to firearms, firearms components, ammunition, or firearms supplies in the state. Nothing in this section shall be construed as affecting a political subdivision's right to adopt zoning ordinances for the purpose of regulating firearms or knives businesses in the same manner as other businesses ..."
NFA weapons restricted?	No	No		
Peaceable journey laws?	No	No		
Background checks required for private sales?	No	No		

== New Jersey ==
Subject / law	Long guns	Handguns	Relevant statutes	Notes
State permit required to purchase?	Yes	Yes		A lifetime purchaser identification card (Firearm ID Cards issued after 2021 expire in 10 years and must be renewed) is required for purchase of rifles and shotguns, as well as for purchases of handgun ammunition. A permit to purchase a handgun, valid for 90 days is required for each handgun purchase. Only one handgun can be purchased within a 30-day period. According to judicial ruling, purchase permits/identification cards are supposed to be granted on a “shall-issue” basis.
Firearm registration?	No	Yes		The NJ State Police Firearms Investigation Unit (NJSP FIU) maintains a record of all handgun transfers, except for inherited firearms willed to the transferee, or firearms brought to the state by new residents moving to the state. Firearm registration is voluntary, but since handgun purchase permits are also a form of register, there is de facto mandatory handgun registration for handguns purchased in-state. Purchases by NJ residents must either be from a licensed dealer in NJ or a private individual who is a resident of NJ. In both dealer purchases and private sales, a copy of the purchase permit is sent to the NJSP FIU. A NICS background check at the point of sale is only required for purchases from dealers.
Owner license required?	No	No		Purchaser Identification Card required to purchase firearms in state. License is not required to own or possess firearms at exempt locations, only to purchase. Firearm must be compliant and/or brought into compliance with NJ law before entering NJ.
Permit required for concealed carry?	N/A	Yes	N.J. Admin. Code § 13:54	New Jersey calls its permit a "permit to carry a handgun" and is a "shall-issue" by judicial ruling for concealed firearm carry. The permit to carry must be approved by the municipality's police chief and the applicant must before their approval pass an NJ state police background check that includes mental health records search, driving record search, and criminal records searches. Disqualifies are extensive and can sometimes even include expunged or dismissed charges related to violence or vandalism, not contesting a TERPO gun confiscation, failing to renew an FPIC card on time, and numerous other disqualifiers.
Permit required for open carry?	No	Yes		Open carry is allowed only with a permit to carry a handgun and is generally not practiced except by security officers and others who carry firearms on duty. While it is technically legal to carry long guns with a valid Firearm Purchaser ID card, it is generally frowned upon by law enforcement, except when hunting. One can expect to be detained and questioned in most places if carrying in this manner. However, open carry of loaded long guns is not permitted. As of 2022 individuals that are not law enforcement and possess a permit to carry a handgun are no longer legally allowed to open carry a handgun.
State preemption of local restrictions?	Limited	Limited		There is limited state preemption for some firearm laws. N.J.S.A. 2C:58-3(f) states in part, "f. Granting of permit or identification card; fee; term; renewal; revocation...There shall be no conditions or requirements added to the form or content of the application, or required by the licensing authority for the issuance or renewal of a permit or identification card, other than those that are specifically set forth in this chapter." A few municipalities have a patchwork of additional safe storage laws stricter than NJ state law.
Assault weapon law?	Yes	Yes	N.J.S.A 2C:39-1	New Jersey prohibits the sale of certain semi-automatic rifles, shotguns, and handguns to ordinary citizens. Assault Firearms can be acquired through an seldom permit issued by an county superior judge.
Magazine capacity restriction?	Yes	Yes	N.J.S.A. 2C:39-1(y); N.J.S.A 2C:39-3(j)	New Jersey bans the purchase of magazines capable of holding more than ten rounds of ammunition to ordinary citizens that can fit in a semi automatic firearm.
NFA weapons restricted?	Yes	Yes	N.J.S.A 2C:39-3(a-c); N.J.S.A 2C:58-5	Possession of short barreled rifles, short barreled shotguns, destructive devices, and suppressors are prohibited to the average citizen. Law is silent on AOWs. Possession of a machine gun requires a state license, which is granted on a may issue basis by a county superior court judge. Machine gun licenses are extremely difficult to obtain.
Background checks required for private sales?	Yes	Yes		Private firearm sales require a background check conducted through a federally licensed gun dealer except for temporary transfers, transfers between law enforcement officers, or transfers between immediate family.
Red flag law?	Yes	Yes		A judge may issue a gun violence restraining order authorizing the police to confiscate a person's firearms if the judge determines that the person poses a significant risk of personal injury to himself or others. New Jersey law allows anyone to file for a Temporary Extreme Risk Protection Order on any person.

== New Mexico ==
Subject / law	Long guns	Handguns	Relevant Statutes	Notes
State permit required to purchase?	No	No		New Mexico does not require any permit to purchase a long gun or handgun.
Firearm registration?	No	No		
Assault weapon law?	No	No		
Magazine Capacity Restriction?	No	No		There is no magazine capacity restriction.
Owner license required?	No	No		
Waiting Period for Firearms Transfers?	7-Days*	7-Days*	NMSA 30-7-7.3	*New Mexico law imposes a 7-day waiting period for most firearms transfers, which has been ruled unconstitutional by the 10th Circuit US Court of Appeals. While the circuit court's would render the waiting period unenforceable, authorities in New Mexico have chosen to ignore the 10th Circuit's ruling and continue to enforce the 7-day waiting period on firearms transfers.
License required for concealed carry?	N/A	Yes	NMSA 29–19–4	Shall-issue to full-time and part-time residents (who hold a valid New Mexico ID/Driver's License), with passage of a criminal history check and mental health records check, and completion of 15-hour handgun safety course that includes live-fire instruction. Active military and law enforcement members and veterans honorably discharged within 20 years of permit application are exempt from training requirement. Permit required to carry concealed loaded firearm on foot. No permit needed for open carry, concealed carry of an unloaded firearm, or transport of a loaded firearm either concealed or openly in a vehicle. Unlawfully carrying a concealed firearm is a petty misdemeanor that is punishable by up to 6 months in a county jail and/or a fine of up to $500. Except for active-duty military members and dependents permanently stationed in the state, New Mexico does not issue CHLs to non-residents.
License required for open carry?	No	No		It is legal to open carry a loaded rifle and/or handgun in New Mexico without a permit.
Vehicle carry permitted?	Yes	Yes		A loaded firearm may be carried/transported either openly or concealed in a vehicle without a permit.
Out-of-state permits recognized?	N/A	Partial	NMSA 29-19-12	New Mexico recognizes permits from states with reciprocity agreements (currently 24 states). New Mexico law limits reciprocity agreements to states with licensing standards that are substantially similar or more restrictive than New Mexico's.
Duty to Inform?	No	No	NMSA 29-19-9	Although not mandated by state law, it is customary in New Mexico to inform law enforcement officials when transporting firearms. Those who are carrying a loaded pistol or revolver concealed while on foot must carry their CHL with them and present it upon demand by law enforcement.
Concealed Carry on College Campuses?	No	No	NMSA 29-19-8; NMSA 30-7-2.4	Firearms and ammunition may be stored in a locked vehicle while parked on campus, and may be carried while driving in a vehicle on campus, but may not be carried on foot while on campus property or stored in an on-campus facility. Exceptions exist for university-sponsored shooting events and ROTC programs.
NFA weapons restricted?	No	No		
State pre-emption of local ordinances?	Yes	Yes	NMSA 29-19-10	As stated in Article 2, Section 6 of the New Mexico Constitution. Tribal laws on Native American reservations not pre-empted. Some tribes recognize New Mexico firearms laws, while others do not and have far more restrictive firearms policies. Additionally, some local jurisdictions have enacted ordinances restricting or banning the discharge of firearms within their boundaries, with exceptions for shooting ranges and designated hunting areas during hunting season.
Castle Doctrine law?	Yes	Yes	NMSA 30-2-7	New Mexico's self-defense statute (NMSA 30-2-7) is vaguely worded and does not specifically address Castle Doctrine or Stand Your Ground situations. However, Castle Doctrine has been established on a limited basis by a 1946 New Mexico Supreme Court ruling, which states that when a person reasonably feels "threatened with an attack need not retreat. In the exercise of his right of self defense, he may stand his ground and defend himself." Currently, the courts have limited the scope of Castle Doctrine/Stand Your Ground to self-defense situations occurring inside the defender's home, and neither law nor court precedents provide the defender immunity from lawsuits by the aggressor arising from the use of lethal force in self-defense. Additionally, judicial precedents in New Mexico have established that the use of lethal force is not justifiable in defense of one's property alone.
Duty to Retreat?	No	No	NM UJI 14-5190	A person who is threatened with an attack need not retreat. In the exercise of his right of self defense, he may stand his ground and defend himself.
Opt-Out statute?	Yes	Yes	NMSA 29–19–12; NMSA 30–14–6; NMAC 10.8.2.27	Property owners may prohibit the carrying of firearms onto property they lawfully possess by posting signage or verbally notifying persons upon entering the property. Violating these "gun-free" establishments is a full misdemeanor punishable by less than one year in the county jail and/or a fine of up to $1,000 (Criminal Trespass - NMSA 30-14-1).
Peaceable journey laws?	No	No		One may travel through or within New Mexico with a loaded weapon in a vehicle. Federal law pre-empts Native American reservation laws. FOPA is observed.
Red Flag Law?	Yes	Yes	NMSA 40-17	NMSA 40-17 allows law enforcement officials to petition a judge to order the temporary seizure of firearms from an individual where there is probable cause that the individual will cause harm to themselves or others. Under the law, the subject has the option to surrender his or her firearms within 48 hours of the order, to law enforcement or to a licensed firearms dealer for safekeeping until the order expires or is rescinded. The judge will then schedule a hearing within 10 days to determine based on the preponderance of evidence if the weapons should be returned to the owner, or to issue an Extreme Risk Firearm Protection Order (ERFPO) for up to 1 year. New Mexico's Red Flag law also allows for an individual subject to an ERFPO to sell or transfer seized/surrendered firearms to a licensed firearms dealer or other non-prohibited buyer, after the buyer has passed a NICS background check. Authorities in some rural jurisdictions have refused to enforce New Mexico's Red Flag Law.
Background checks required for private sales?	Yes	Yes	NMSA 30-7-7.1	Effective July 1, 2019. Senate Bill 8, which establishes a requirement for NICS background checks for private-party transfers was signed into law on March 8, 2019. Exceptions will exist for active/retired LEO transfers and transfers between immediate family members. Some local counties have adopted Second Amendment sanctuary resolutions in opposition to universal background check laws.

== New York ==
Subject / law	Long guns	Handguns	Relevant statutes	Notes
State permit required to purchase?	Partial	Yes	S 265.20, S 265.01	Handguns and semi-automatic rifles require a permit. Permits are issued by County or State Supreme Court judges/justices outside of New York City, Westchester, Nassau and Suffolk Counties, with a background check. Permits for those wanting to carry concealed or possess handguns in the home are issued on a "shall-issue" basis. No NYS permit is required for shotguns and non-semiautomatic rifles. Firearms defined as assault weapons cannot be bought. NOTE: Different laws apply for NYC
Firearm registration?	No	Yes	S 700.00, S 265.01	Handguns: All handguns must be registered under a license. There is a $3 registration fee. Handguns are registered with purchase permit. The serial number and sale is noted down. Antique weapons are exempted from this. All handguns must travel in the manner one's license is issued. No record is needed of previously owned handguns with law enforcement. Non-assault weapon long guns: No registration required. Assault weapons: All rifles classified as assault weapons were required to be registered with the state by January 15, 2014, and are illegal otherwise. NOTE: Different laws apply for NYC
Owner license required?	No	Yes	S 265.20, S 265.01	No license is required for long guns; however, New York State requires a license for handgun ownership. Handgun licenses are normally restricted to three types: residence or business premises permit, Target & Hunting, and Unrestricted Carry. Target and hunting allows carry while engaged in those activities. Unrestricted allows carry at any time. All permits issued outside of New York City are not valid in New York City except for retired police and federal law enforcement officers with that status marked on their permit and for armored car guards on duty. The minimum age to be issued a handgun license is 21 unless one is a former or current member of the armed forces or law enforcement. NOTE: Different laws apply for NYC
License required for concealed carry?	N/A	Yes	S 400.00	New York counties, or the police departments in New York City and Nassau and Suffolk counties, issue unrestricted concealed carry licenses on a "shall issue" basis. Prior to June 23, 2022, licenses were issued on a "may issue" basis, but this practice was held unconstitutional by the Supreme Court. Previously, discretionary issuance policies varied widely across the state. It is not a crime to carry a weapon under a Target or Hunting permit for other purposes, but if caught or reported, the permit will likely be revoked. Concealed carry without any kind of permit is a felony unless the weapon is unloaded and no ammunition for it is in possession of the person carrying. All permits are valid throughout the state, except in New York City, unless validated by the police commissioner of that city, or by armored car guards, retired police officers and retired federal law enforcement officers as specified in the Criminal Procedure Law. NY Penal Law 400(6). While New York law does not allow issuance of pistol licenses to non-residents, 2013 federal appeals court and State appeals court rulings clarified the residency requirement. This clarification allowed those domiciled outside of the state with a part-time residence in New York to be issued a permit.
Open carry allowed?	No	No	S 265.35, S 265.01	Open carry in public is not legal in most instances. While no law specifically bans open carry, a license to carry is issued to carry concealed as per penal law 400. Therefore, pistol permit holders must carry concealed. Open carry is permitted while hunting and possibly on one's own property. Open carry of unloaded long guns is not explicitly prohibited by any law, but is generally not practiced. It is illegal to transport a loaded long gun in a motor vehicle, except in some scenarios while hunting.
Assault weapon law?	Yes	Yes	S 265.00, S 265.02	Possession of assault weapons is prohibited, except for those legally possessed on January 15, 2013 and registered with the state by January 15, 2014 or classified as an antique assault weapon. New York City, Buffalo, Albany, and Rochester have enacted their own assault weapon bans. Law enforcement and retired law enforcement are exempt from the assault weapons ban.
Magazine capacity restriction?	Yes	Yes	§ 265.02	Magazine size is limited to 10 rounds. Law enforcement and retired law enforcement with last service weapon only, are exempt from the 10 round limit. Also exempt are antique high-quality magazines if registered to an associated antique assault weapon. The 10 round magazine law is part of the NY SAFE Act. A legal provision that mandated no more than 7 rounds that may be loaded into the magazine was struck down by a federal judge on December 31, 2013. NOTE: Different laws apply for NYC
Title II (National Firearms Act) weapons restricted?	Yes	Yes	S 265.02, S 265.02	Ownership of machine guns, suppressors, short-barreled rifles, AOW's and short-barreled shotguns are prohibited to the average citizen. Destructive devices are permitted except for rockets with greater than 3 ounces of propellant. AOW's disguised as non-firearms are illegal.
Castle Doctrine Law?	Yes*	Yes*	§ 35.20	New York's castle doctrine law permits the use of non-deadly physical force to stop the commission of "a crime involving damage to premises". Deadly force may be used to stop the commission of arson if someone "reasonably believes" it to be necessary. Deadly force is also permitted to be used by someone who is "in possession or control of [a] premises, or a person licensed or privileged to be thereon or therein" to stop the commission of burglary, if they reasonably believe it to be necessary.
State preemption of local restrictions?	No	No	None	New York preempts only handgun licensing. Places such as Buffalo, Rochester, Albany, and New York City have put in more restrictive gun laws, such as licensing of long guns and 5-round magazine limits.
Peaceable journey laws?	Yes	Yes	S 265.10	With certain restrictions (see below), most notably magazines are not exempt.
Background checks required for private sales?	Yes	Yes	NY Gen Bus L § 898 (2012)	For firearm transfers between private parties, a licensed dealer must conduct a background check, provide documentation of the check to the New York State Police, and keep a record of the transaction.
Red flag law?	Yes	Yes		Family members, school officials or law enforcement can ask courts to temporarily block someone from buying or owning a gun.
Minimum age to purchase or possess?	Yes	No		The minimum age to purchase a semiautomatic rifle is 21. (Under federal law the minimum age to purchase a handgun is 21.)

== North Carolina ==
Subject / law	Long guns	Handguns	Relevant statutes	Notes
State permit required to purchase?	No	No	Senate Bill 41	Senate Bill 41, Guarantee Second Amendment Freedom and Protections, eliminates all pistol purchase permitting laws in the state. Enacted and effective March 29, 2023.
Federal Background Checks Required for all purchase through Firearms Dealers	Yes	Yes		In 2023, North Carolina repealed its law requiring a permit to purchase a handgun and is no longer a partial point of contact state for NICS. Firearms dealers must contact the FBI to process the background check required by federal law.
Background checks required for private sales?	No	No		In 2023, the North Carolina legislature overrode the governor's veto to repeal its law requiring a permit and background check to buy a handgun. The state does not otherwise require background checks on purchases of firearms from unlicensed sellers. Federal and state purchaser prohibitions still apply.
Firearm registration?	No	No		
Assault weapon law?	No	No		
Magazine capacity restriction?	No	No		
Owner license required?	No	No		
Permit required for concealed carry?	N/A	Yes	§ 14-269 §§ 14-415.10 to 14-415.27	North Carolina is a "shall issue" state for citizens and lawful permanent residents who are 21 years or older.
Permit required for open carry?	No	No	§ 160A-189	May carry openly without permit.
Castle Doctrine/Stand Your Ground law?	Yes	Yes	§ 14-51.3	
State preemption of local restrictions?	Yes	Yes	§ 14-409.40 § 14-415.23	Municipalities may ban firearms from government buildings.
NFA weapons restricted?	No	No	§ 14-288.8 § 14-409	
Shall certify?	Yes	Yes	§ 14-409.41	Shall certify within 15 days.
Peaceable Journey laws?	No	No		
Duty to inform?	No	Yes	§ 14-415.11(a)	

== North Dakota ==
Subject / law	Long guns	Handguns	Relevant statutes	Notes
State permit required to purchase?	No	No		
Firearm registration?	No	No		
Assault weapon law?	No	No		
Magazine capacity restriction?	No	No		
Owner license required?	No	No		
Permit required for concealed carry?	N/A	No	62.1-03-01; 62.1-04-03	North Dakota is a "shall issue" state for citizens and lawful permanent residents who are 18 years or older. Class 1 permits are issued to those 21 or older, and Class 2 permits are issued to those 18 or older. Permitless carry took effect on August 1, 2017.
Permit required for open carry?	No	Yes	62.1-03-01	May carry openly without permit.
Castle Doctrine/Stand Your Ground law?	Yes	Yes	12.1-05-07	
State preemption of local restrictions?	Yes	Yes	62.1-01-03	"A political subdivision, including home rule cities or counties, may not enact a zoning ordinance or any other ordinance relating to the purchase, sale, ownership, possession, transfer of ownership, registration, or licensure of firearms and ammunition which is more restrictive than state law."
NFA weapons restricted?	No	No	62.1-01-01	Binary triggers are not considered machine guns.
Shall certify?	Yes	Yes	62.1-05-03	Shall certify within 30 days.
Peaceable Journey laws?	No	No		
Background checks required for private sales?	No	No		
Duty to inform?	Yes	Yes	62.1-04-04	Only when carrying without a permit.

== Ohio ==
Subject / law	Long guns	Handguns	Relevant statutes	Notes
State permit required to purchase?	No	No		
Firearm registration?	No	No		
Assault weapon law?	No	No	O.R.C. 2923.11	
Magazine capacity restriction?	No	No		
Owner license required?	No	No		
Permit required for concealed carry?	N/A	No	O.R.C. 2923.111; O.R.C. 2923.12; O.R.C. 2923.125	Ohio is a "shall issue" state for citizens and lawful permanent residents who are 21 years or older. Permitless carry took effect on June 13, 2022.
Permit required for open carry?	No	No	O.R.C. 2923.111; O.R.C. 2923.16	May carry openly without permit.
Castle Doctrine/Stand Your Ground law?	Yes	Yes	O.R.C. 2901.09	
State preemption of local restrictions?	Yes	Yes	O.R.C. 9.68	
NFA weapons restricted?	No	No	O.R.C. 2923.17	
Shall certify?	Yes	Yes	O.R.C. 311.43	Shall certify within 45 days.
Peaceable Journey laws?	No	No		
Background checks required for private sales?	No	No		
Duty to inform?	No	If asked by a law enforcement officer	O.R.C. 2923.12; O.R.C. 2923.16	If asked by Law Enforcement. Section 2923.12 (B)(1)
Purchase age restriction?	Yes, 18+	Yes, 21+	O.R.C. 2923.211(B)	In addition to federal law, state law prohibits sales of handguns to those under 21, including in private transactions.

== Oklahoma ==
Subject / law	Long guns	Handguns	Relevant statutes	Notes
State permit required to purchase?	No	No		
Firearm registration?	No	No		
Assault weapon law?	No	No		
Magazine capacity restriction?	No	No		
Owner license required?	No	No		
Red Flag law?	No	No	§ 21-1289.24c	Oklahoma has an anti-red flag law that bars the state or any political subdivision thereof from enacting laws allowing or mandating the confiscation of firearms from individuals who are not legally prohibited under state and federal law from owning firearms.
Permit required for concealed carry?	N/A	No	§ 21-1272 § 21-1290.5	Oklahoma is a "shall issue" state for citizens and lawful permanent residents who are 21 years or older. Permitless carry took effect on November 1, 2019.
Permit required for open carry?	No	No		May carry openly without permit.
Castle Doctrine/Stand Your Ground law?	Yes	Yes	§ 21-1289.25	"A person who is not engaged in an unlawful activity and who is attacked in any other place where he or she has a right to be has no duty to retreat and has the right to stand his or her ground and meet force with force, including deadly force, if he or she reasonably believes it is necessary to do so to prevent death or great bodily harm to himself or herself or another or to prevent the commission of a forcible felony."
State preemption of local restrictions?	Yes	Yes	§ 21-1289.24	"No municipality or other political subdivision of this state shall adopt any order, ordinance or regulation concerning in any way the sale, purchase, purchase delay, transfer, ownership, use, keeping, possession, carrying, bearing, transportation, licensing, permit, registration, taxation other than sales and compensating use taxes or other controls on firearms, knives, components, ammunition and supplies."
NFA weapons restricted?	No	No		
Shall certify?	Yes	Yes	§ 21-1289.30	Shall certify within 15 days.
Peaceable Journey laws?	No	No		
Background checks required for private sales?	No	No		

== Oregon ==
Subject / law	Long guns	Handguns	Relevant statutes	Notes
State permit required to purchase?	No	No	Oregon Ballot Measure 114	Ballot Measure 114 instituted a requirement for a permit to purchase. Due to litigation the revised law is not currently in effect.
Firearm registration?	No	No	ORS 166.412(7)(a)	The Oregon State Police maintain a record of firearms sales from FFL holders for a period of 5 years, after which the records are destroyed.
Owner license required?	No	No		
Minimum age to purchase firearms.	18	21	ORS 166.470	Oregon law prohibits any person from intentionally selling, delivering, or otherwise transferring any firearm to anyone under 18 years of age (ORS 166.470(1)(a)), except: A parent or guardian, or another person with the consent of the parent or guardian, may transfer a firearm other than a handgun to a minor. (ORS 166.470(3)(a)); The temporary transfer of any firearm to a minor for hunting, target practice, or any other lawful purpose. (ORS 166.470(3)(b))
Minors allowed to possess firearms?	Yes, with exceptions	Yes, with exceptions	ORS 166.250	Minors may: ...possess a firearm other than a handgun if the firearm was transferred to the minor by the minor’s parent or guardian or by another person with the consent of the minor’s parent. ORS 166.250(2)(a)(A); ...not possess a firearm if they are under 18 years of age, and while a minor, committed the equivalent of an adult felony or a misdemeanor involving violence, within four years of being charged with possession. ORS 166.250(1)(c); ...may also possess any firearm temporarily for hunting, target practice, or any other lawful purpose. ORS 166.250(2)(a)(B) ( and ORS 166.470(3)(b); see above)
Assault weapon ban?	No	No	---	No Oregon state laws define or regulate assault weapons. Some local counties have adopted Second Amendment sanctuary resolutions regardless.
License required for concealed carry?	Yes	Yes	ORS 166.291	Oregon is a "shall-issue" state for residents. Technically sheriffs "may issue" licenses to non-residents of contiguous states; however, in practice most county sheriffs either adopt very restrictive criteria for issuance to non-residents or simply refuse to issue licenses. Carrying of a concealed firearm is prohibited by ORS 166.250, however holders of a valid Concealed Handgun License are exempt from this law. (see ORS 166.260). As of 2021, campus carry is left up each university to decide. Prior to that, a 2011 Oregon Court of Appeals ruling stated that public universities did not have the authority to prohibit firearms on their grounds, but could still prohibit them inside buildings.
License required for open carry?	No	No	Or. Const. Art. I § 27 ORS 166.250(3)	Open carry of firearms is legal statewide without a permit. However, Oregon law allows a city or county to regulate open carry of loaded firearms in public places, but holders of concealed carry permits are exempt. (ORS 166.173) The cities of Portland, Beaverton, Tigard, Oregon City, Salem, and Independence, as well as Multnomah County, have statutes which do not allow open carry of loaded firearms (unless one has a concealed carry permit).
State preemption of local restrictions?	Yes	Yes	Or. Const. Art. I § 27 ORS 166.170	The authority to regulate the sale, acquisition, transfer, ownership, possession, storage, transportation, or use of firearms or any element relating to firearms and firearm components, including ammunition, is vested solely in the State Legislative Assembly.
NFA weapons restricted?	No	No	ORS 166.272	Possession of NFA restricted firearms and non-firearm items is legal, but owners must comply with the NFA regulations. (ORS 166.272(3))
Peaceable journey laws?	Yes	Yes	---	The State of Oregon recognizes federal law, Title 18 U.S. Code § 926A
Background checks required for private sales?	Yes	Yes	ORS 166.435	Private party firearm transfers must be conducted through a licensed firearm dealer while both parties are present. The dealer is required by federal law to conduct a background check and keep a record of the sale. Transfers between family members (spouse, parent/stepparent, child/stepchild, sibling, grandparent, grandchild, aunt/uncle, first cousin, niece/nephew, spouse of any of the above) are exempt.
Red flag law?	Yes	Yes	Or. Law Chp. 737 (2017)	If a person appears to be in imminent danger of hurting themselves or another person, a police officer or a member of the person's family or household may petition the court for a one-year order that would prohibit the person from possessing a deadly weapon.
High-capacity magazine ban	No	No	Oregon Ballot Measure 114	Ballot Measure 114 bans the sale, transfer, or importation of magazines that can hold more than ten rounds of ammunition. Possession of such magazines remains legal, with some restrictions. Due to litigation the new law is not currently in effect.

== Pennsylvania ==
Subject / law	Long guns	Handguns	Relevant statutes	Notes
State permit required to purchase?	No	No		
Firearm registration?	No	No	18 Pa.C.S. § 6111.4	All handgun buyers in the state must undergo a PICS check at the point of sale, a record of which is maintained by the state police in a "sales database". However, firearm owners moving to Pennsylvania from another state are not required to register their firearms. As stated in 18 Pa.C.S. § 6111.4: "Notwithstanding any section of this chapter to the contrary, nothing in this chapter shall be construed to allow any government or law enforcement agency or any agent thereof to create, maintain or operate any registry of firearm ownership within this Commonwealth."
Assault weapon law?	No	No		
Magazine capacity restriction?	No	No		
Owner license required?	No	No		
Permit required for concealed carry?	N/A	Yes	18 Pa.C.S. § 6109	
Permit required for open carry?	No	No	18 Pa.C.S. § 6107; 18 Pa.C.S. § 6108	May carry openly without permit, except LTCF required in Philadelphia (City of the First Class), in a vehicle, or during a declared state of emergency. On May 31, 2019, the Supreme Court of Pennsylvania ruled that carrying a firearm is not reasonable suspicion to detain someone.
Castle Doctrine/Stand Your Ground law?	Yes	Yes	18 Pa.C.S. § 505	"An actor who is not engaged in a criminal activity, who is not in illegal possession of a firearm...has no duty to retreat and has the right to stand his ground and use force, including deadly force, if: (i) the actor has a right to be in the place where he was attacked; (ii) the actor believes it is immediately necessary to do so to protect himself against death, serious bodily injury, kidnapping or sexual intercourse by force or threat; and (iii) the person against whom the force is used displays or otherwise uses: (A) a firearm or replica of a firearm as defined in 42 Pa.C.S. § 9712 (relating to sentences for offenses committed with firearms); or (B) any other weapon readily or apparently capable of lethal use"
State preemption of local restrictions?	Yes	Yes	18 Pa.C.S. § 6120	"No county, municipality or township may in any manner regulate the lawful ownership, possession, transfer or transportation of firearms, ammunition or ammunition components when carried or transported for purposes not prohibited by the laws of this Commonwealth."
NFA weapons restricted?	No	No		
Peaceable Journey laws?	Yes	Yes	18 Pa.C.S. § 6106(b)(11)(14)	Non-residents may carry in a vehicle if in possession of a valid carry permit from any state. Otherwise, federal rules observed.
Background checks required for private sales?	No	Yes	18 Pa.C.S. § 6111(c)	All private party transfers of handguns must be processed through a licensed dealer, or at a county sheriff's office. In either case a background check is required.

== Rhode Island ==
Subject / law	Long guns	Handguns	Relevant statutes	Notes
State permit required to purchase?	No	Yes	RI Gen. Stat. 11–47–35	All purchasers of handguns and ammunition must complete and pass a safety exam managed by the RI Department of Environmental Management, at which time they will receive a DEM issued pistol/revolver safety certificate, also known as a "blue card" allowing for purchase (R.I. Hunter Safety Education card is equivalent). Exempt are active duty military members, active and retired law enforcement officers, correctional officers, and persons licensed to carry a concealed handguns by RI Gen. Stat. 11–47–11.
Firearm registration?	No	No	RI Gen. Stat. 11–47–41	Explicitly illegal under state law.
Assault weapon law?	Yes	No	2025-S 0359A	An assault weapon purchase ban is set to take effect on July 1st, 2026. This law does not ban the possession of legally defined assault weapons, but instead bans their purchase, transfer, manufacture and sale within the state.
Owner license required?	No	No	None	“Blue card” certificate is required for purchase of ammunition and handguns, but no license is required for possession.
License required for concealed carry?	N/A	Yes	RI Gen. Stat. 11–47–8; RI Gen. Stat. 11–47–11; RI Gen. Stat. 11–47–18	Rhode Island is a hybrid "shall issue" and "may issue" state for carry. Licenses may be granted either by local authorities or by the state's attorney general's office. Licenses granted by local authorities are "shall issue" while those issued by the attorney general's office are "may issue" under state law. Until recently, most local authorities had been deferring to the attorney general which effectively blocks most issuance, unless one is a retired law enforcement officer. The practice of not issuing permits on a true "shall issue" basis has been the subject of recent litigation. In April 2015, the Rhode Island Supreme Court ruled that a police chief must accept and review carry permit applications and must render a decision and the reasons for that decision. More significantly, the court ruled that the issuing authority must "show cause" for denying an applicant a carry license. Permits issued by local authorities and the Attorney General's office are valid for concealed carry statewide.
License required for open carry?	No	Yes	RI Gen. Stat. 11–47–8; RI Gen. Stat. 11–47–11; RI Gen. Stat. 11–47–18; RI Gen. Stat. 11–47–51	Open carry of handguns permitted with a valid Rhode Island pistol permit. Locally issued permits do not expressly authorize open carry. Open carry of loaded long guns along public roadways is prohibited by law.
Vehicle carry?	No	Yes	RI Gen. Stat. 11–47–8	Permitted with a valid Rhode Island pistol permit for handguns. Non-residents may carry in a vehicle with a valid concealed carry permit issued by another state while traveling through Rhode Island without any intent to stop while in the state. Long guns must be unloaded.
Out-of-state permits recognized?	N/A	Vehicle carry only	RI Gen. Stat. 11–47–8	Non-residents may carry handguns in a vehicle with a valid carry permit issued by another state while traveling through Rhode Island without any intent to stop while in the state.
State preemption of local restrictions?	Yes	Yes	RI Gen. Stat. 11–47–58	
Castle Doctrine Law?	Yes	Yes	RI Gen. Stat. 11–8–8	No duty to retreat while in one's home.
NFA weapons restricted?	Yes	Yes	RI Gen. Stat. 11–47–8; RI Gen. Stat. 11–47–20	It is a violation of state law to possess any NFA weapon or silencers with the exception of Class III FFLs.
Peaceable Journey laws?	No	Yes	RI Gen. Stat. 11–47–8	One may possess a loaded handgun in a motor vehicle without a RI permit as long as one possesses a carry permit from another state and is merely transiting through Rhode Island without any unnecessary stops. Long guns must be unloaded while in a vehicle. FOPA is observed.
Background checks required for private sales?	Yes	Yes	RI Gen. Stat. 11–47–35; RI Gen. Stat. 11–47–8	For all firearm transfers, the buyer must pass a background check conducted by the police department in their home municipality. Exempt are active law enforcement officers and those licensed to carry a concealed firearm by RI Gen. Stat. 11–47–11.
Red flag law?	Yes	Yes	RI Gen. Stat.8–8.3	The police may petition the Superior Court to issue an extreme risk protection order if they receive credible information of a significant and imminent risk. A judge may issue a temporary gun-removal order, but a hearing is required within 14 days to determine if a one-year ban on buying or possessing a firearm is warranted. Some localities have adopted Second Amendment sanctuary resolutions in opposition.
Waiting period?	Yes	Yes	RI Gen. Stat. 11–47–35	After purchasing a firearm, the waiting period before the buyer can take possession is 7 days. Exempt are active law enforcement officers and those licensed to carry a concealed firearm by RI Gen. Stat. 11–47–11.

== South Carolina ==
Subject / law	Long guns	Handguns	Relevant statutes	Notes
State permit required to purchase?	No	No		
Firearm registration?	No	No		
Assault weapon law?	No	No		
Magazine capacity restriction?	No	No		
Owner license required?	No	No		
Permit required for concealed carry?	N/A	No	SC Code 23-31-210	South Carolina is a "shall issue" state for citizens and lawful permanent residents who are 18 years or older. Permitless carry took effect on March 14, 2024.
Permit required for open carry?	No	No	SC Code 16-23-20	May carry openly without permit.
Castle Doctrine/Stand Your Ground law?	Yes	Yes	SC Code 16-11-440	
State preemption of local restrictions?	Yes	Yes	SC Code 23-31-510; SC Code 23-31-520	"No governing body of any county, municipality, or other political subdivision in the State may enact or promulgate any regulation or ordinance that regulates or attempts to regulate: (1) the transfer, ownership, possession, carrying, transportation, ammunition, components, or any combination of these things..."
NFA weapons restricted?	No	No		
Peaceable Journey laws?	No	No		
Background checks required for private sales?	No	No		
Duty to inform?	No	Yes	SC Code 23-31-215	

== South Dakota ==
Subject / law	Long guns	Handguns	Relevant statutes	Notes
State permit required to purchase?	No	No		South Dakota law provides for a Gold Card permit that allows people to skip the NICS check but it is not required to purchase firearms. It is also equivalent to a regular carry permit in terms of reciprocity.
Firearm registration?	No	No		
Magazine capacity restriction?	No	No		
Owner license required?	No	No		
Permit required for concealed carry?	N/A	No	SD 23-7-7	South Dakota is a "shall issue" state for citizens and lawful permanent residents who are 18 years or older. Enhanced permits are issued to those 21 or older, and regular permits are issued to those 18 or older. Permitless carry took effect on July 1, 2019.
Permit required for open carry?	No	No		
Castle Doctrine/Stand Your Ground law?	Yes	Yes	SD 22-18-4	"A person who uses or threatens to use force in accordance with this section does not have a duty to retreat before using or threatening to use force."
State preemption of local restrictions?	Yes	Yes	SD 7-18A-36; SD 8-5-13; SD 9-19-20	No county, township, or municipality "may pass an ordinance that restricts or prohibits, or imposes any tax, licensure requirement, or licensure fee on the possession, storage, transportation, purchase, sale, transfer, ownership, manufacture, or repair of firearms or ammunition or their components."
NFA weapons restricted?	No	No		
Peaceable Journey laws?	No	No		
Background checks required for private sales?	No	No		

== Tennessee ==
Subject / law	Long guns	Handguns	Relevant statutes	Notes
State permit required to purchase?	No	No		
Firearm registration?	No	No		
Assault weapon law?	No	No		
Magazine capacity restriction?	No	No		
Owner license required?	No	No		
Permit required for concealed carry?	N/A	No	T.C.A. § 39-17-1307; T.C.A. § 39-17-1308; T.C.A. § 39-17-1351; T.C.A. § 39-17-1366	Tennessee is a "shall issue" state for citizens and lawful permanent residents who are 18 years or older. Concealed and Enhanced permits are issued. Enhanced permits are issued to those who complete a training course. Permitless carry took effect on July 1, 2021.
Permit required for open carry?	N/A	No	T.C.A. § 39-17-1307; T.C.A. § 39-17-1308	May carry handguns loaded openly without permit. Long guns may only be carried unloaded.
Castle Doctrine/Stand Your Ground law?	Yes	Yes	T.C.A. § 39-11-611	
State preemption of local restrictions?	Yes	Yes	T.C.A. § 39-17-1314; T.C.A. § 39-17-1359	Local governments may post signs to prohibit carry on government property. Local governments may not, however, prohibit firearms in locally owned/operated parks and other recreational areas.
NFA weapons restricted?	No	No		
Shall certify?	Yes	Yes	T.C.A. § 39-17-1361	Shall certify within 15 days.
Peaceable Journey laws?	No	No		
Background checks required for private sales?	No	No		

== Texas ==
Subject / law	Long guns	Handguns	Relevant statutes	Notes
State permit required to purchase?	No	No		
Firearm registration?	No	No		
Assault weapon law?	No	No		
Magazine capacity restriction?	No	No		
Owner license required?	No	No		
Red flag law?	No	No		(Also known as the Extreme Risk law.) Texas doesn't have a red-flag law, which allows for temporary firearm removal from individuals believed to be at risk of harming themselves or others.
Permit required for concealed carry?	N/A	No	Tex. Government Code § 411.172; Tex. Penal Code § 46.02	Texas is a "shall issue" state for citizens and lawful permanent residents who are 21 years or older. Permitless carry took effect on September 1, 2021.
Permit required for open carry?	No	No	Tex. Penal Code § 42.01(a)(8); Tex. Penal Code § 46.02	Handguns must be carried in a holster. Open carry on college campuses is prohibited. Permitless carry took effect on September 1, 2021.
Campus carry?	No	Yes	Tex. Government Code § 411.2031; Tex. Penal Code § 46.03	May carry in parking lots, parking garages, outdoor walkways on campus. Public four-year universities and public two-year colleges must allow concealed carry in campus buildings. Universities and colleges will be allowed to designate certain sensitive areas as "gun free zones"; these are subject to legislative analysis.
Castle Doctrine/Stand Your Ground law?	Yes	Yes	Tex. Penal Code § 9.32	
State preemption of local restrictions?	Yes	Yes	Tex. Government Code § 411.209; Tex. Local Government Code § 229.001; Tex. Local Government Code § 236.002	
NFA weapons restricted?	No	No	Tex. Penal Code § 46.05	
Peaceable Journey laws?	Yes	Yes	Tex. Penal Code § 46.02(a)(2); Tex. Penal Code § 46.15(b)(2)	
Background checks required for private sales?	No	No		
Duty to inform?	No	Yes	Tex. Government Code § 411.205	Only when one has a concealed carry permit.

== Utah ==
Subject / law	Long guns	Handguns	Relevant statutes	Notes
State permit required to purchase?	No	No		
Firearm registration?	No	No		
Assault weapon law?	No	No		
Magazine capacity restriction?	No	No		
Owner license required?	No	No		
Permit required for concealed carry?	N/A	no	https://le.utah.gov/xcode/Title53/Chapter5A/53-5a-S102.2.html	Concealed carrying a long gun, shotgun, or muzzleloader is prohibited without a valid permit. Those above 21 or with a valid permit may concealed carry a loaded or unloaded handgun, except in prohibited areas. A concealed carry permit is available to anyone above 18 without a felony or certain violent convictions who doesn’t engage in criminal or risky behavior, such as drug use or excessive drinking. Permits lift restrictions for carry in or around public schools or higher education. They also affords other rights, such as allowing possession of a loaded long gun in vehicle and the waiving of background checks when purchasing from licensed firearms dealer.
Permit required for open carry?	n/a	no	https://le.utah.gov/xcode/Title53/Chapter5A/53-5a-S102.2.html	Under laws enacted in 05/07/2025, one may not open carry a loaded long gun, shotgun, or muzzleloader in a vehicle. Those above 21 years old without a permit or between 18-20 possessing a valid CWP may open carry a loaded firearm in unprohibited areas. Exceptions allow for lawfully carrying a loaded handgun in a vehicle one owns or is allowed in, and open carrying of unloaded weapons, for anyone above 18 and in legal possession of the firearm.
Castle Doctrine law?	Yes	Yes	UT Code § 76-2-405	Force in defense of habitation. "(1) A person is justified in using force against another when and to the extent that he reasonably believes that the force is necessary to prevent or terminate the other's unlawful entry into or attack upon his habitation; however, he is justified in the use of force which is intended or likely to cause death or serious bodily injury only if: (a) the entry is made or attempted in a violent and tumultuous manner, surreptitiously, or by stealth, and he reasonably believes that the entry is attempted or made for the purpose of assaulting or offering personal violence to any person, dwelling, or being in the habitation and he reasonably believes that the force is necessary to prevent the assault or offer of personal violence; or (b) he reasonably believes that the entry is made or attempted for the purpose of committing a felony in the habitation and that the force is necessary to prevent the commission of the felony. (2) The person using force or deadly force in defense of habitation is presumed for the purpose of both civil and criminal cases to have acted reasonably and had a reasonable fear of imminent peril of death or serious bodily injury if the entry or attempted entry is unlawful and is made or attempted by use of force, or in a violent and tumultuous manner, or surreptitiously or by stealth, or for the purpose of committing a felony."
Stand Your Ground law?	Yes	Yes	UT Code § 76-2-402	Force in defense of person – Forcible felony defined. "(1) (a) A person is justified in threatening or using force against another when and to the extent that the person reasonably believes that force or a threat of force is necessary to defend the person or a third person against another person's imminent use of unlawful force. (b) A person is justified in using force intended or likely to cause death or serious bodily injury only if the person reasonably believes that force is necessary to prevent death or serious bodily injury to the person or a third person as a result of another person's imminent use of unlawful force, or to prevent the commission of a forcible felony."
State preemption of local restrictions?	Yes	Yes	UT Code § 53-5a-102 UT Code § 76-10-500	
NFA weapons restricted?	No	No		
Shall certify?	Yes	Yes	UT Code § 53-5a-104	Shall certify within 15 days.
Peaceable Journey laws?	Yes	Yes	UT Code § 76-10-523(4)	
Background checks required for private sales?	No	No		

== Vermont ==
Subject / law	Long guns	Handguns	Relevant statutes	Notes
State permit required to purchase?	No	No		Must be 21 to purchase any firearm. May purchase long guns at 16 if purchasing from someone other than a federally licensed firearm dealer and the purchaser presents a certificate of completion of a hunter safety course approved by the Vermont Commissioner of Fish and Wildlife.
Firearm registration?	No	No		
Assault weapon law?	No	No		
Magazine restriction?	Yes	Yes		A gun control bill, passed on March 30, 2018, bans sale or possession of magazines of more than 10 rounds for long guns and 15 rounds for pistols. It was signed by Governor Phil Scott on April 11. Previously owned high capacity magazines are grandfathered.
Owner license required?	No	No		
Permit required for concealed carry?	N/A	No	Vermont Firearm Laws	May carry open or concealed without permit as long as one is a citizen of the U.S. or a lawfully admitted alien, and not otherwise prohibited from possessing firearms under state or federal law.
Permit required for open carry?	No	No		
State preemption of local restrictions?	Yes	Yes	24 V.S.A. § 2295	
NFA weapons restricted?	No	No		Vermont legalized suppressors on June 17, 2015.
Background checks required for private sales?	Yes	Yes		
Red flag law?	Yes	Yes		
Storage requirement?	Yes	Yes	Act 45 2023	Store "in a locked container or equipped with a tamper-resistant mechanical lock or other safety device."
Waiting period?	Yes	Yes	Act 45 2023	Seventy-two hours; waiting period not required for transfers where a background check is not required.

== Virginia ==
Subject / law	Long guns	Handguns	Relevant statutes	Notes
State permit required to purchase?	No	No		
Firearm registration?	No	No	§ 18.2-295	Fully automatic firearms (machine guns) are required to be registered with the state police.
Owner license required?	No	No		Proof of age and citizenship required for the purchase of firearms.
Permit required for concealed carry?	N/A	Yes	§ 18.2-308	Virginia is a "shall issue" state for concealed carry. Permits are issued to residents and non-residents. As of January 1, 2021, the option of obtaining training via an electronic, video or online course will be removed. In a vehicle, a firearm is exempt from the requirement for a concealed carry permit if the firearm is "properly secured in a container or compartment within the vehicle" (ie glove box, center console, trunk, etc). The container/compartment does not have to be locked, the firearm may be within the reach of the driver or a passenger, and the firearm may be loaded. This does not preempt an employer from prohibiting firearms "at a place of employment if there is a company policy or signage prohibiting firearms on the premises." Furthermore, a "county or city may by ordinance make it unlawful for any person to transport, possess or carry a loaded shotgun or loaded rifle in any vehicle on any public street, road, or highway within such locality." However, this does not "apply to duly authorized law-enforcement officers or military personnel in the performance of their lawful duties, nor to any person who reasonably believes that a loaded rifle or shotgun is necessary for his personal safety in the course of his employment or business."
Permit required for open carry?	No	No	§ 15.2-915.2 § 18.2-287.4 § 18.2-282	Open carry is generally allowed without a permit for people 18 years of age and older. The following cities and counties have exceptions that disallow the open carry of a loaded semi-automatic center-fire rifle or pistol that expels single or multiple projectiles by action of an explosion of a combustible material and is equipped at the time of the offense with a magazine that will hold more than 20 rounds of ammunition or designed by the manufacturer to accommodate a silencer or equipped with a folding stock or shotguns equipped with a magazine that holds more than 7 rounds: the Cities of Alexandria, Chesapeake, Fairfax, Falls Church, Newport News, Norfolk, Richmond, and Virginia Beach and in the Counties of Arlington, Fairfax, Henrico, Loudoun, and Prince William. These restrictions do not apply to valid concealed carry permit holders. Stated differently, one may open carry an assault weapon/shotgun with more than 7 rounds with a permit in the aforementioned locations, but do not need a permit to do so in any other locality in Virginia. In a vehicle, a firearm may be considered "openly carried" if the firearm is openly visible, though this is not as well established as the "secured in a container/compartment" rule mentioned above.
State preemption of local restrictions?	Yes	Yes	§ 15.2-915	Virginia has state preemption for most but not all firearm laws. As of July 1, 2020, local governments have expanded power to ban firearms in certain sensitive areas, such as government buildings and public events.
Assault weapon law?	Yes	Yes	§ 18.2-308.2:2 § 18.2-308.2:01 § 18.2-308.7	Proof of age (18+ for long arms, 21+ for pistols) and proof of citizenship (or permanent residence license) are required for the purchase of "assault weapons". "Assault weapons" are defined as a semi-automatic, centerfire, firearm equipped with a folding stock, or equipped at the time with a magazine capable of holding more than 20 rounds, or capable of accommodating a silencer/suppressor.
Magazine restriction?	No	No	§ 18.2-287.4 § 18.2-282.	Magazines capable of holding more than 20 rounds are legal but, they make the firearm an "assault weapon", subject to law accordingly.
NFA weapons restricted?	No	No	§ 18.2-308.8 § 18.2-308.5 § 18.2-295	Fully automatic firearms (machine guns) must be registered with the state police. Plastic firearms and some destructive devices (such as the striker 12 shotgun) are prohibited outside law enforcement. SBS, SBR, AOWs, and suppressors are legal with NFA paperwork.
Background checks required for private sales?	Yes	Yes	18.2-308.2:5	As of July 1, 2020, firearms sellers, with some exceptions, must obtain criminal history information from the Virginia State Police to determine if a firearm buyer is permitted, under applicable state and federal law, to purchase or possess firearms. Notably, the law does not apply to transfers of firearms in which nothing of value is exchanged for the firearm. The penalty for noncompliance with the law is a Class 1 misdemeanor. In Virginia, Class 1 misdemeanors are punishable by up to 1 year in jail and a $2,500 fine.
Red flag law?	Yes	Yes		A judge can issue an Extreme Risk Protective Order, enabling the police to temporarily confiscate the firearms of a person deemed to be at high risk of harming themselves or others.

== Washington ==
Subject / law	Long guns	Handguns	Revised Code of Washington	Notes
State permit required to purchase?	Partial	Yes		Must be 21 to purchase a pistol or semiautomatic rifle. Since July 2019, the purchaser of a semiautomatic rifle must provide proof of completing a recognized firearm safety training program in the last five years.
Firearm registration?	Partial	Partial		Retail dealers must record and report all retail pistol sales to local police/sheriff and to state department of licensing, and must record and report all semiautomatic rifle sales after July 1, 2019.
Owner license required?	No	No		
Constitutional Right to Bear Arms?	Yes	Yes		
Permit required for concealed carry?	N/A	Yes		Washington is a "shall-issue" state and will grant concealed carry permits to all applicants who meet the criteria. There are no training requirements.
Permit required for open carry?	No	No	(in vehicle)	Open carry is lawful in Washington without any permit. Open carry of a loaded handgun in a vehicle is legal only with a concealed pistol license. Open carry of a loaded long gun in a vehicle is illegal, regardless of CPL possession. On January 31, 2019, the Washington Court of Appeals ruled that the mere possession of a handgun is not sufficient for conducting a Terry stop.
State preemption of local restrictions?	Yes	Yes		State law does not allow more restrictive local laws. Seattle and Edmonds have passed ordinances mandating safe storage of firearms when not being carried or used. Seattle's ordinance also has reporting requirement for lost or stolen firearms within 24 hours. Both cities are being sued for violation of state preemption. Edmonds had its ordinance struck down in October 2019.
Assault weapons law?	Yes	Yes		As of April 25, 2023, the sale, distribution, importation, and manufacturing of semi-automatic firearms classified as assault weapons are prohibited. Possession of assault weapons already owned remains legal.
Magazine capacity restrictions?	Yes	Yes		As of July 1, 2022, the manufacture, distribution, and sale of magazines that have a capacity of over 10 rounds are prohibited. The possession of such magazines, however, is not restricted.
NFA weapons restricted?	Partial	Partial		Machine guns and short-barreled shotguns—unless purchased before July 1, 1994—are illegal for non-law-enforcement possession. Suppressors, destructive devices and any other weapons are lawful to possess and use if registered properly with ATF. Short barreled rifles are lawful to possess and use if registered properly with the ATF, as of June 12, 2014.
Peaceable Journey laws?	No	No		Federal travel-with-a-firearm laws apply. Some out-of-state CCW licenses valid, otherwise carry must be open or, in a vehicle, unloaded.
Castle Doctrine / Stand your ground law?	Not defined - de facto			The Washington State Supreme Court ruled "that there is no duty to retreat when a person is assaulted in a place where he or she has a right to be."
Background checks required for private sales?	Yes	Yes	Initiative 594 (2014)	Private party firearm transfers must be conducted through a licensed dealer, who is required by federal law to conduct a background check and keep a record of the sale, unless one of the specifically enumerated exceptions in RCW § 9.41.113.
Red flag law?	Yes	Yes		The police may temporarily take guns away from people a judge deems a threat to themselves or others without notice to the defendant. If the defendant does not appear to request the restrictions be lifted, they will remain in place.

== West Virginia ==
Subject / law	Long guns	Handguns	Relevant statutes	Notes
State permit required to purchase?	No	No		
Firearm registration?	No	No		
Assault weapon law?	No	No		
Magazine capacity restriction?	No	No		
Owner license required?	No	No		
Permit required for concealed carry?	N/A	No	§ 61-7-4 § 61-7-7	West Virginia is a "shall issue" state for citizens and lawful permanent residents who are 18 years or older. Regular permits are issued to those 21 or older, and Provisional permits are issued to those 18 to 21. Permitless carry took effect on May 24, 2016.
Permit required for open carry?	No	No		May carry openly without permit.
Castle Doctrine/Stand Your Ground law?	Yes	Yes	§ 55-7-22	
State preemption of local restrictions?	Yes	Yes	§ 8-12-5a	"Neither a municipality nor the governing body of any municipality may, by ordinance or otherwise, limit the right of any person to purchase, possess, transfer, own, carry, transport, sell, or store any deadly weapon, firearm, or pepper spray, or any ammunition or ammunition components to be used therewith nor to so regulate the keeping of gunpowder so as to directly or indirectly prohibit the ownership of the ammunition in any manner inconsistent with or in conflict with state law."
NFA weapons restricted?	No	No		
Shall certify?	Yes	Yes	§ 61-7-16	Shall certify within 30 days.
Peaceable Journey laws?	No	No		
Background checks required for private sales?	No	No		

== Wisconsin ==
Subject / law	Long guns	Handguns	Relevant statutes	Notes
State permit required to purchase?	No	No	Wis. Stat. § 175.35	A purchaser is prohibited from receiving a handgun from a FFL dealer until they’ve been approved through the state de-facto permitting scheme which is to pay a State background check fee to the state DOJ for it to conduct an additional background check (over and above the Federal 4473).
Firearm registration?	No	No		
Assault weapon law?	No	No		
Magazine capacity restriction?	No	No		
Owner license required?	No	No		
Permit required for concealed carry?	N/A	Yes	Wis. Stat. § 175.60; Wis. Stat. § 941.23	Wisconsin is a "shall issue" state for citizens and lawful permanent residents who are 21 years or older.
Permit required for open carry?	No	No	Wis. Stat. § 947.01	May carry openly without permit.
Castle Doctrine/Stand Your Ground law?	Yes	Yes	Wis. Stat. § 895.62; Wis. Stat. § 939.48	
State preemption of local restrictions?	Yes	Yes	Wis. Stat. § 66.0409	
NFA weapons restricted?	No	No	Wis. Stat. § 941.27	Machine guns may not shoot pistol cartridges and may not be possessed aggressively or offensively.
Peaceable Journey laws?	No	No	Wis. Stat. § 167.31	
Background checks required for private sales?	No	No		

== Wyoming ==
Subject / law	Long guns	Handguns	Relevant statutes	Notes
State permit required to purchase?	No	No		
Firearm registration?	No	No		
Assault weapon law?	No	No		
Magazine capacity restriction?	No	No		
Owner license required?	No	No		
Permit required for concealed carry?	N/A	No	W.S. § 6-8-104	Wyoming is a "shall issue" state for citizens and permanent lawful residents who are 21 years or older. Residents of states that have reciprocity with Wyoming and who possess a permit can also apply for a Wyoming permit. Permitless carry took effect on July 1, 2011.
Permit required for open carry?	No	No		May carry openly without permit.
Castle Doctrine/Stand Your Ground law?	Yes	Yes	W.S. § 6-2-602	"A person who is attacked in any place where the person is lawfully present shall not have a duty to retreat before using reasonable defensive force pursuant to subsection (a) of this section provided that he is not the initial aggressor and is not engaged in illegal activity."
State preemption of local restrictions?	Yes	Yes	W.S. § 6-8-401	"Except as authorized by W.S. 15-1-103(a)(xviii) and 21-3-132, no city, town, county, political subdivision or any other entity shall authorize, regulate or prohibit the sale, transfer, purchase, delivery, taxation, manufacture, ownership, transportation, storage, use, carrying or possession of firearms, weapons, accessories, components or ammunition except as specifically provided by this chapter. This section shall not affect zoning or other ordinances which encompass firearms businesses along with other businesses. Zoning and other ordinances which are designed for the purpose of restricting or prohibiting the sale, purchase, transfer or manufacture of firearms or ammunition as a method of regulating firearms or ammunition are in conflict with this section and are prohibited."
NFA weapons restricted?	No	No	W.S. §§ 6-8-402 to 6-8-406	Wyoming Firearms Freedom Act, passed in 2010, prohibits any government servant from enforcing the NFA if a personal firearm, a firearm accessory, or ammunition is owned or manufactured commercially or privately in Wyoming and remains within the borders of Wyoming. A firearm manufactured in Wyoming must have the words "made in Wyoming" clearly stamped on a central metallic part, such as the receiver or frame. While federal enforcement is still possible, the law penalizes federal agents from enforcing such laws.
Background checks required for private sales?	No	No		

== United States territories ==
=== American Samoa ===
Subject/Law	Long guns	Handguns	Relevant statutes	Notes
Permit required to purchase?	Yes	N/A		A license is required to possess or import long guns or ammunition. Handguns are prohibited for civilian possession despite D.C. v Heller and McDonald v Chicago.
Firearm registration?	Yes	Yes		All firearms must be registered with the American Samoa Public Safety Department.
Assault weapon law?	No	No		All handguns and centerfire firearms banned; Only 12, 16, 20 and 410 gauge shotguns and shotgun shells and 22 caliber rifles and their ammunitions are allowed
Magazine capacity restriction?	No	No		
Concealed carry allowed?	N/A	No		Concealed carry is illegal.
License required for open carry?	Yes	Yes		Open carry is legal for holders of a valid License to Possess which are required to purchase and possess firearms; though Licenses to Possess have been restricted to only shotguns and rimfire rifles since 1991, effectively banning handguns. Licenses issued for handguns and other firearms prior to 1991 are grandfathered as long as they remain valid.
NFA weapons restricted?	Yes	Yes		Explosive weapons, machine guns, gas guns, short barreled rifles, short barreled shotguns, and silencers are prohibited.
Peaceable journey laws?	No	No		Federal law (FOPA) applies.

=== Guam ===
Subject/Law	Long guns	Handguns	Relevant Statutes	Notes
Permit required to purchase?	Yes	Yes	60103, 60106	A Firearms Identification Card, issued by the Guam Police Department, is required to purchase firearms on Guam.
Firearm registration?	Yes	Yes	60110	All firearms must be registered within three business days with the Guam Police Department.
Owner License Required	Yes	Yes	60106	An owner's license that states the firearms make, model, and date of purchase and registration is issued once the firearm is registered with the Guam Police Department.
License required for concealed carry?	N/A	Yes	60109	Shall Issue. Bill 296-32 passed by legislature for shall issue, signed by Governor Eddie Calvo.
License required for open carry?	Yes	Yes		Firearms Identification Card required.
Assault weapon law	No	No		None specified.
Magazine capacity restriction?	No	No		None specified.
NFA weapons restricted?	Yes	Yes	60102, 60103	Guam's Federal Firearms Licensees have no means of registering machine guns, short-barreled rifles and short-barreled shotguns under the National Firearms Act. All federal laws and statutes apply to the territory. Barrel length restrictions are present under the Guam Code Annotated and are similar to federal NFA law: Handgun barrels cannot exceed 12 in., rifle barrels cannot be shorter than 16 in., shotgun barrels cannot be shorter than 18 in. Previously restricted, firearm silencers are permitted as of July, 2025, provided that the specifications, purchase, ownership, possession, and use of a firearm silencer complies with applicable federal and local laws, rules, and regulations. Destructive devices and AOWs are legal with NFA tax stamp
Castle law	Yes	Yes		

=== Northern Mariana Islands ===
Subject/law	Long guns	Handguns	Relevant statutes	Notes
Permit required to purchase?	Yes	Yes		A license is required to purchase guns or ammunition.
Firearm registration?	No	No		Registration of firearms has been ruled unconstitutional.
Assault weapon law?	No	No		Ban on assault weapons was ruled unconstitutional.
Magazine capacity restriction?	Yes*	Yes*		No magazines over 10 rounds. The Attorney General's Office has allowed the US Postal Service in the CNMI to issue standard capacity magazines which hold more than 10 rounds.
License required for concealed carry?	—N/a	No		Concealed carry is banned.
License required for open carry?	—N/a	No		The general ban on carrying operable firearms in public was ruled unconstitutional. Lawful gun owners may carry loaded handguns openly as long as other laws are not violated, such as gun-free zones.
NFA weapons restricted?	Yes	Yes		Short barreled shotguns, short barreled rifles, machine guns, suppressors, and grenade launchers are prohibited.
Peaceable journey laws?	No	No		Federal law (FOPA) applies.

=== Puerto Rico ===
Subject/law	Long guns	Handguns	Relevant statutes	Notes
Permit required to purchase?	Yes	Yes		Permit is required to purchase a firearm in Puerto Rico from an FFL or Private Sale. The permit is the firearms license that doubles as a concealed carry license.
Firearm registration?	Yes	Yes		The Puerto Rico Police maintains a registry not accessible by the public.
Assault weapon law?	No	No		
Magazine capacity restriction?	No	No		
Owner license required?	Yes	Yes		As of January 1, 2020, the owner license and carry license are the same.
Permit required for concealed carry?	Yes	Yes		As of January 1, 2020, shall-issue. Previously may-Issue according to law, but permits were rarely granted to ordinary citizens. Unrestricted concealed carry was technically allowed from June 20, 2015 to October 31, 2016 following a lawsuit challenging Puerto Rico's restrictive gun laws. The lower court ruling striking down many of the territory's laws was appealed by the government to the appeals court, which reversed the lower court's decision. The Puerto Rico Supreme Court declined to hear the appeal of the appeals court ruling from the plaintiffs in the case, effectively restoring Puerto Rico's restrictive permitting policy for concealed carry.
Open carry allowed?	No	No		Permitless open carry was technically allowed from June 20, 2015, to November 16, 2016, following a lawsuit challenging Puerto Rico's restrictive gun laws. The lower court ruling striking down many of the territory's laws was appealed by the territorial government to the appeals court, which reversed the lower court's decision on November 16, 2016. The Puerto Rico Supreme Court has declined to hear the appeal of the appeals court ruling from the plaintiffs in the case, effectively restoring Puerto Rico's ban on open carry.
NFA weapons restricted?	Yes	Yes		Suppressors and Machine Guns banned by state law.
Peaceable journey laws?	Yes	No		Federal law (FOPA) applies.
Background checks required for private sales?	Yes	Yes		Private sales transfers must be done through an FFL or the Puerto Rico Police.

=== U.S. Virgin Islands ===
Subject/Law	Long guns	Handguns	Relevant statutes	Notes
Permit required to purchase?	Yes	Yes		A license is required to purchase any firearm or ammunition.
Firearm registration?	Yes	Yes		All firearms must be registered with the Virgin Islands Police Department.
Assault weapon law?	Yes	Yes		Assault weapons and .50 BMG rifles prohibited.
Magazine capacity restriction?	Yes	Yes		
License required for concealed carry?	N/A	Yes		The territory currently has a "shall issue" policy for concealed carry permits due to the Supreme Court's Bruen decision. To obtain one, the applicant must meet a stringent set of requirements, so few people receive permits.
Open carry allowed?	No	No		Open carry is prohibited.
NFA weapons restricted?	Yes	Yes		Automatic firearms and short barreled shotguns are prohibited.
Peaceable journey laws?	No	No		Federal law (FOPA) applies.

== See also ==
- Gun law in the United States
- Index of gun politics articles
