= Kentucky Revised Statutes =

Statutory law of Kentucky

Kentucky Revised Statutes (KRS) is the name given to the body of laws which govern the Commonwealth of Kentucky, United States. They are created pursuant to the Kentucky Constitution and must conform to the limitations set out in the Constitutions of Kentucky and the United States. The laws of Kentucky may also be superseded by statutes of the United States where the two bodies of law conflict.

== Origins ==
The Kentucky Revised Statutes were enacted in 1942, largely as a result of the Statute Committee of 1936. The goal of the committee was to reduce the amount of clutter that had accumulated in Kentucky's prior statutes and draft an organized body of law from what remained. The most important task was rearranging statutes that were topically related but not located near one another in the statutes as they existed.

1942 also saw the creation of a Statute Revision Commission and office of Reviser of Statutes. In 1954 the jobs of the Commission and Reviser were consolidated and transferred to the Legislative Research Commission.

== KRS today ==
By law, the Legislative Research Commission is directed to clarify, organize, plan, and draft laws. It is also responsible for publishing the laws online.
