= History of the United States (1991–2016) =

The United States of America — Post-Cold War Era
- 1991–2016
History of the United States (1980–1991)	History of the United States (2016–present)
- War on Terror: Naval Air Station North Island, San Diego, Calif. (May 2, 2003) -- Sailors aboard USS Abraham Lincoln (CVN 72) man the rails as the ship pulls into NAS North Island, during their port visit to off-load the ship’s Air Wing in support of Operation Enduring Freedom
- Location: United States
- Including: Reagan era War on terror War on drugs Third Industrial Revolution; Migrations: New Great Migration; Illegal immigration surge
- President(s): George H. W. Bush; Bill Clinton; George W. Bush; Barack Obama
- Key events: 1991–2001: Gulf War; NAFTA; 1992 Los Angeles riots; Hurricane Andrew; Don't ask, don't tell; Republican Revolution; WTC bombing; Oklahoma City bombing; Impeachment of Bill Clinton; Columbine massacre; Launch of the Web; Early 2000s recession; 2001–2008: September 11 attacks; War on terror; War in Afghanistan; Iraq War; Hurricane Katrina; Housing bubble; Great Recession; Great Recession; 2008–2016: 2008 United States presidential election; Tea Party movement; Deepwater Horizon oil spill; Occupy Wall Street movement; 2010s global surveillance disclosures; Diplomatic cables leak; Citizens United v. FEC; Killing of Osama bin Laden; 2011 Super Outbreak; Killing of Trayvon Martin; 2012 Benghazi attack; Hurricane Sandy; Sandy Hook Elementary School shooting; Boston Marathon bombing; United States federal government shutdown; Black Lives Matter movement; Mexico–United States border crisis; 2014 American immigration crisis; Ferguson unrest; 2015 Baltimore protests; Charleston church shooting; Obergefell v. Hodges; 2015 San Bernardino attack; Pulse nightclub shooting

The history of the United States from 1991 to 2016 began following the dissolution of the Soviet Union. The dissolution signaled the end of the Cold War and left the U.S. unchallenged as the world's sole superpower. The U.S. took a leading role in military involvement in the Middle East. The U.S. expelled an Iraqi invasion force from Kuwait, a Middle Eastern ally of the U.S., in the Persian Gulf War. On the domestic front, the Democrats won a return to the White House with the election of Bill Clinton in 1992. In the 1994 midterm election, the Republicans won control of Congress for the first time in 40 years. Strife between Clinton and the Republicans in Congress initially resulted in a federal government shutdown following a budget crisis, but later they worked together to pass welfare reform, the Children's Health Insurance Program, and a balanced budget. Charges from the Clinton–Lewinsky scandal led to the 1998 impeachment of Bill Clinton by the House of Representatives but he was later acquitted by the Senate. The U.S. economy boomed in the enthusiasm for high-technology industries in the 1990s until the Nasdaq crashed as the dot-com bubble burst and the early 2000s recession marked the end of the sustained economic growth.

In 2000, Republican George W. Bush was elected president in one of the closest elections in U.S. history. Early in his term, his administration approved education reform and a large across-the-board tax cut aimed at stimulating the economy. Following the September 11 attacks in 2001, the U.S. embarked on the global war on terrorism, starting with the 2001 war in Afghanistan to depose the Taliban and eliminate Al-Qaeda. In 2003, the U.S. invaded Iraq, deposing Saddam Hussein and setting up the Republic of Iraq resulting in a prolonged conflict that would continue over the course of the decade. The Homeland Security Department was formed and the controversial Patriot Act was passed to bolster domestic efforts against terrorism. In 2006, criticism over the handling of the disastrous Hurricane Katrina (which struck the Gulf Coast region in 2005), political scandals, and the growing unpopularity of the Iraq War helped the Democrats gain control of Congress. Saddam Hussein was later tried, charged for war crimes and crimes against humanity, and executed by hanging. In 2007, President Bush ordered a troop surge in Iraq, which ultimately led to reduced casualties.

The collapse of the housing bubble in 2007 led to the Great Recession. The resulting economic downturn and general discontent led Barack Obama to win the presidential election in 2008, becoming the country's first African-American president. Obama's domestic agenda notably included economic stimulus packages and the Affordable Care Act. The year 2011 saw the formal end to the Iraq War, the killing of Al-Qaeda leader Osama bin Laden, and the outbreak of the Syrian Civil War. The war on terror continued with an increase in the use of drone warfare and a shift in attention toward the Islamic State in the 2010s. In 2016, China surpassed the United States to become the world's largest economy when measured by purchasing power parity (PPP).

== Globalization and the new economy ==
During Bill Clinton's presidency American political discourse focused mostly on domestic issues. While the early 1990s saw the US economy mired in recession, a recovery began starting in 1994 and began accelerating thanks to a boom created by technology. The Internet and related technologies made their first broad penetrations into the economy, prompting a Wall Street technology-driven bubble, which Federal Reserve chairman Alan Greenspan described in 1996 as "irrational exuberance". By 1998, the economy was booming and unemployment below 5%.

Following the dissolution of the Soviet Union in 1991, the United States was the world's dominant military power and Japan, sometimes seen as the largest economic rival to the U.S., was caught in a period of stagnation. China was emerging as the U.S.'s foremost trading competitor in more and more areas, with China's exports growing exceedingly during the 1990s and well into the 2000s. Localized conflicts such as those in Haiti and the Balkans prompted President Bill Clinton to send in U.S. troops as peacekeepers, reviving the Cold-War-era controversy about whether policing the rest of the world was a proper U.S. role. Islamic radicals overseas loudly threatened assaults against the U.S. for its ongoing military presence in the Middle East, and even staged the first World Trade Center attack, a truck bombing in New York's twin towers, in 1993, as well as a number of deadly attacks on U.S. interests abroad.

Immigration, mainly from Latin America and Asia, swelled during the 1990s, laying the groundwork for great changes in the demographic makeup of the U.S. population in coming decades, such as Hispanics replacing African-Americans as the largest minority. Despite tougher border scrutiny after the September 11 attacks, nearly 8 million immigrants came to the United States from 2000 to 2005—more than in any other five-year period in the nation's history—with almost half entering illegally.

The 1990s saw the US becoming more involved in free trade with the NAFTA agreement involving the US, Canada and Mexico being signed in 1992 before coming into effect in 1994 along with joining the World Trade Organization in 1995. During this period, inflation remained low despite recessions happening making it different from previous times in US history when inflation would increase when the economy grew. Deflation was only reported in one year which was 2009 with the inflation rate being −0.4%.

=== Dot-com bubble ===
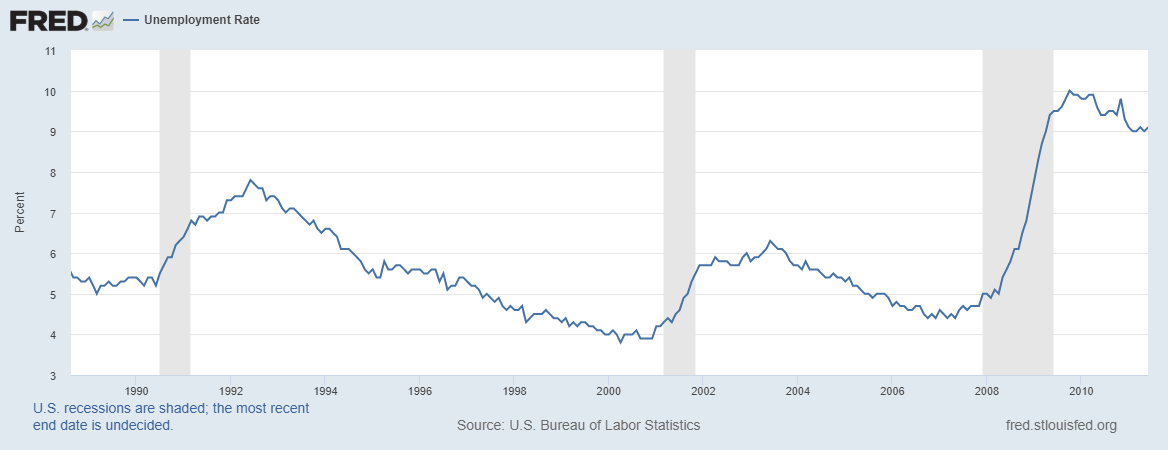
US unemployment rate, 1988–2011

Early 2000 to 2001 saw the dramatic bursting of the dot-com bubble. Excitement over the prospects of Internet stocks had led to huge increases in the major indexes. However, dozens of start-up Internet companies failed as many of the lofty promises heralded by the new world of the Web failed to materialize. On March 10, 2000, the Nasdaq peaked at 5,048.62, more than double its value just a year before. The downturn began on March 13, 2000, triggering a chain reaction of selling that fed on itself as investors, funds, and institutions liquidated positions. In just six days, the NASDAQ had lost nearly nine percent, falling to 4,580 on March 15. By 2001, the bubble was deflating at full speed. A majority of the dot-coms ceased trading after burning through their venture capital, many having never made a profit.

In 2002, the GDP growth rate rose to 2.8%. A major short-term problem in the first half of 2002 was a sharp decline in the stock market, fueled in part by the exposure of dubious accounting practices in some major corporations. Another was unemployment, which experienced the longest period of monthly increase since the Great Depression. The United States began to recover from the post-9/11 recession in 2003, but the robustness of the market (7% GDP growth), combined with the unemployment rate (above 6%), led some economists and politicians to refer to the situation as a "jobless recovery". Despite this, economic growth continued apace through early 2008 and unemployment dropped below 5%.

=== Great Recession ===
The Great Recession began in December 2007 and was both a financial crisis and a deep recession. While the recession officially lasted from December 2007 to June 2009, it took a number of years for the economy to recover to pre-crisis levels of employment and output. This slow recovery was due in part to households and financial institutions paying off debts accumulated in the years preceding the crisis along with restrained government spending following initial stimulus efforts. It followed the bursting of the housing bubble, the housing market correction and subprime mortgage crisis.

According to the Department of Labor, roughly 8.7 million jobs (about 7%) were shed from February 2008 to February 2010, and real GDP contracted by 4.2% between Q4 2007 and Q2 2009, making the Great Recession the worst economic downturn since the Great Depression. The GDP bottom, or trough, was reached in the second quarter of 2009 (marking the technical end of the recession that is defined by "a period of falling economic activity spread across the economy, lasting more than a few months, normally visible in real GDP, real income, employment, industrial production, and wholesale-retail sales"). Real (inflation-adjusted) GDP did not regain its pre-crisis (Q4 2007) peak level until Q3 2011. Unemployment rose from 4.7% in November 2007 to peak at 10% in October 2009, before returning steadily to 4.7% in May 2016. The total number of jobs did not return to November 2007 levels until May 2014. Some areas, such as jobs in public health, have not recovered as of 2023.

Households and non-profit organizations added approximately $8 trillion in debt during the 2000–2008 period (roughly doubling it and fueling the housing bubble), then reduced their debt level from the peak in Q3 2008 until Q3 2012, the only period this debt declined since at least the 1950s. However, the debt held by the public rose from 35% GDP in 2007 to 77% GDP by 2016, as the government spent more while the private sector (e.g., households and businesses, particularly the banking sector) reduced the debt burdens accumulated during the pre-recession decade. President Barack Obama declared the bailout measures started under the Bush administration and continued during his administration as completed and mostly profitable as of December 2014.

=== Rise of the Chinese economy ===
In 2016 China surpassed the United States as the world's largest economy when measured by purchasing power parity (PPP). (Note: GDP figures exclude Taiwan, and the special administrative regions of Hong Kong and Macau)

== Conflicts ==
=== Persian Gulf War ===
U.S. military aircraft flying over Iraq during the Gulf War

The considerable dependence of the industrialized world on oil starting in the 1930s, with much of the proved oil reserves situated in Middle Eastern countries, became evident to the U.S., first in the aftermath of the 1973 world oil shock and later in the second energy crisis of 1979. Although in real terms oil prices fell back to pre-1973 levels through the 1980s, resulting in a windfall for the oil-consuming nations (especially North America, Western Europe, and Japan), the vast reserves of the leading Middle East producers guaranteed the region its strategic importance. By the early 1990s the politics of oil still proved as hazardous as it did in the early 1970s.

Conflict in the Middle East triggered yet another international crisis on August 2, 1990, when Iraq invaded and attempted to annex neighboring Kuwait. U.S. officials feared that Hussein was then on the verge of armed conflict with oil-rich Saudi Arabia, a close ally of Washington's since the 1940s. The United Nations condemned the invasion as an act of aggression; President Bush compared Hussein to Adolf Hitler and declared that if the United States and international community did not act, aggression would be encouraged elsewhere in the world. The Security Council gave Iraq a deadline to leave Kuwait, but Saddam Hussein ignored it, and the Security Council authorized a military response. The war began in January 1991, with U.S. troops forming the majority of the coalition which participated in Operation Desert Storm. By the time Iraqi troops withdrew from Kuwait in late February, Iraq had lost approximately 20,000 troops, with some sources citing as many as 100,000 casualties on the Iraqi side.

=== Conflicts in Somalia, Bosnia, Kosovo, and the Middle East ===
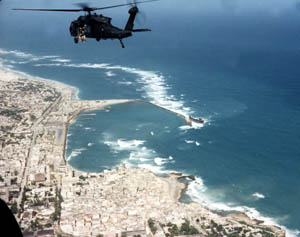
An American helicopter flies over the Somalian coast during the Battle of Mogadishu, part of U.S. involvement in Somalia in the early 1990s.

In December 1992, President Bush sent troops to join the UN Operation Restore Hope, a multi-national effort to restore order and provide humanitarian aid in Somalia, which was torn by civil war, famine, and warlords. By the summer of 1993, the situation had deteriorated. After 24 Pakistani soldiers were killed in June 1993, the UN passed a resolution calling for the arrest and trial of those responsible for the attack. Under the leadership of newly elected President Bill Clinton, U.S. forces launched a concentrated attack on Aidid's stronghold in Mogadishu in Operation Gothic Serpent. In October 1993, 18 soldiers were killed and 84 were wounded in the Battle of Mogadishu. Following the attack, Clinton ordered U.S. forces withdrawn from the region, with the last being withdrawn by 1995, and fired his Secretary of Defense Les Aspin who had not sent adequate forces.

In the mid-1990s, the United States was involved in the Bosnian War through the North Atlantic Treaty Organization (NATO), most notably the 1995 bombing campaign, which finally led to the Dayton Peace Agreement which ended the war by the end of 1995. In early 1998, the region became volatile again as war erupted between the army of the Federal Republic of Yugoslavia and the Kosovo Liberation Army, a guerrilla group. A 1999 NATO bombing campaign struck Yugoslavia, resulting in the deaths of hundreds of Yugoslavian soldiers and civilians. As a result, Yugoslavia withdrew from Kosovo and Kosovo became an independent state.

President Clinton also ordered cruise missile strikes on Iraq in 1996 and bombing attacks on Iraq in 1998, which were launched in response to Saddam Hussein's violation of several UN resolutions, including repression of ethnic minorities (Kurds) and removing UN weapons inspectors. The 1998 campaign, in particular, was meant to de-stabilize the Iraqi government and degrade the power of Hussein. Clinton also signed the Iraq Liberation Act to appropriate funds to Iraqi opposition groups in the hopes of overthrowing Hussein's regime and establishing democracy.

Throughout the 1990s, the United States also played an active role in peace efforts in the Israeli–Palestinian conflict. President Clinton, Israeli Prime Minister Yitzhak Rabin, and Palestinian Prime Minister Yasser Arafat met and signed the Oslo Accords in 1993, which called for the gradual ceding of control of Palestinian areas to the Palestinians in exchange for peace. However, Rabin was assassinated in 1995 and by 2000, the Camp David Summit failed to yield a new agreement.

=== Early Islamist terrorist attacks ===
The 1990s also featured a series of increasingly violent attacks associated with Islamist terrorists, including al-Qaeda, a radical Islamist militant organization led by Osama bin Laden. On February 26, 1993, a truck bomb was detonated at the World Trade Center in New York City, killing six civilians and injuring 919 others, 88 firefighters, and 35 police officers. The attack was intended to destroy the foundation of the North Tower, knocking the tower into the South Tower, which would destroy both buildings and kill thousands of people. While this did not happen, the bomb caused considerable damage to the lower levels of the North Tower. In 1994, four men were convicted of carrying out the bombing and in 1997, two men were convicted for their roles, including the truck driver and the mastermind, Ramzi Yousef.

On June 25, 1996, members of Hezbollah Al-Hejaz bombed the Khobar Towers, a complex in Khobar, Saudi Arabia, where members of the United States Air Force were being housed, killing 19 American airmen and injuring over 300 other people.

On August 7, 1998, Al-Qaeda bombed the U.S. embassies in Kenya and Tanzania, killing 224 people, including 12 Americans. The U.S. launched cruise missile strikes on a terrorist training camp in Afghanistan, yet this failed to destroy al-Qaeda's vast network.

On October 12, 2000, al-Qaeda militants bombed the USS Cole off the coast of Yemen, killing 17 U.S. sailors and severely damaging the ship.

=== Attacks of September 11, 2001 ===
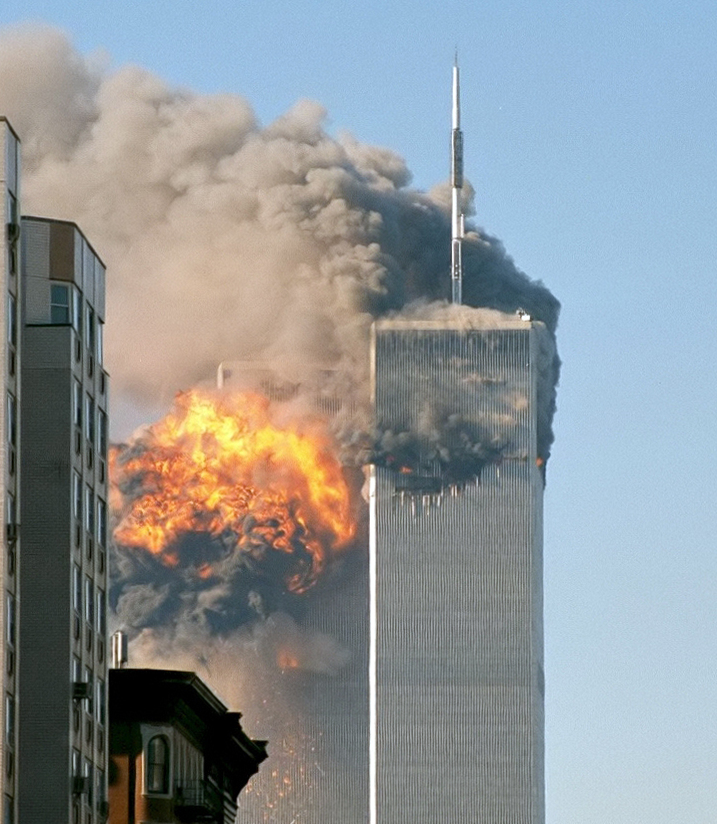
The northeast face of the South Tower of the World Trade Center after being struck by United 175

On the morning of September 11, 2001, four airliners were hijacked by 19 members of the terrorist organization al-Qaeda. The first hijacked airliner, American Airlines Flight 11, struck the North Tower of the World Trade Center at 8:46 A.M. (EST) in New York City; with a second, United Airlines Flight 175, striking the South Tower less than twenty minutes later at 9:03 A.M. (EST), resulting in the collapse of both 110-story skyscrapers, and the destruction of the World Trade Center. The third hijacked plane, American Airlines Flight 77, was crashed into the Pentagon (the headquarters of the United States Department of Defense) in Arlington County, Virginia, demolishing a section of the outer southwest facing wall. After passengers discovered that their plane, United Airlines Flight 93, was going to be used as a missile, they attempted to regain control of the aircraft which had been redirected towards Washington, D.C. However, the hijackers crashed the plane close to a rural community near Shanksville, Pennsylvania. It is believed that the target of Flight 93 was either the White House or the Capitol. In total, the attacks killed 2,996 people—2,507 civilians, 343 firefighters, 72 law enforcement officers, 55 military personnel, and the 19 terrorists. The 9/11 attack was the single deadliest international terrorist incident and the most devastating foreign attack on American soil since the Japanese surprise attack on Pearl Harbor on December 7, 1941. It refocused American attention to a long war on terrorism, beginning with an attack on al-Qaeda and its Taliban supporters in Afghanistan.

=== War in Afghanistan ===
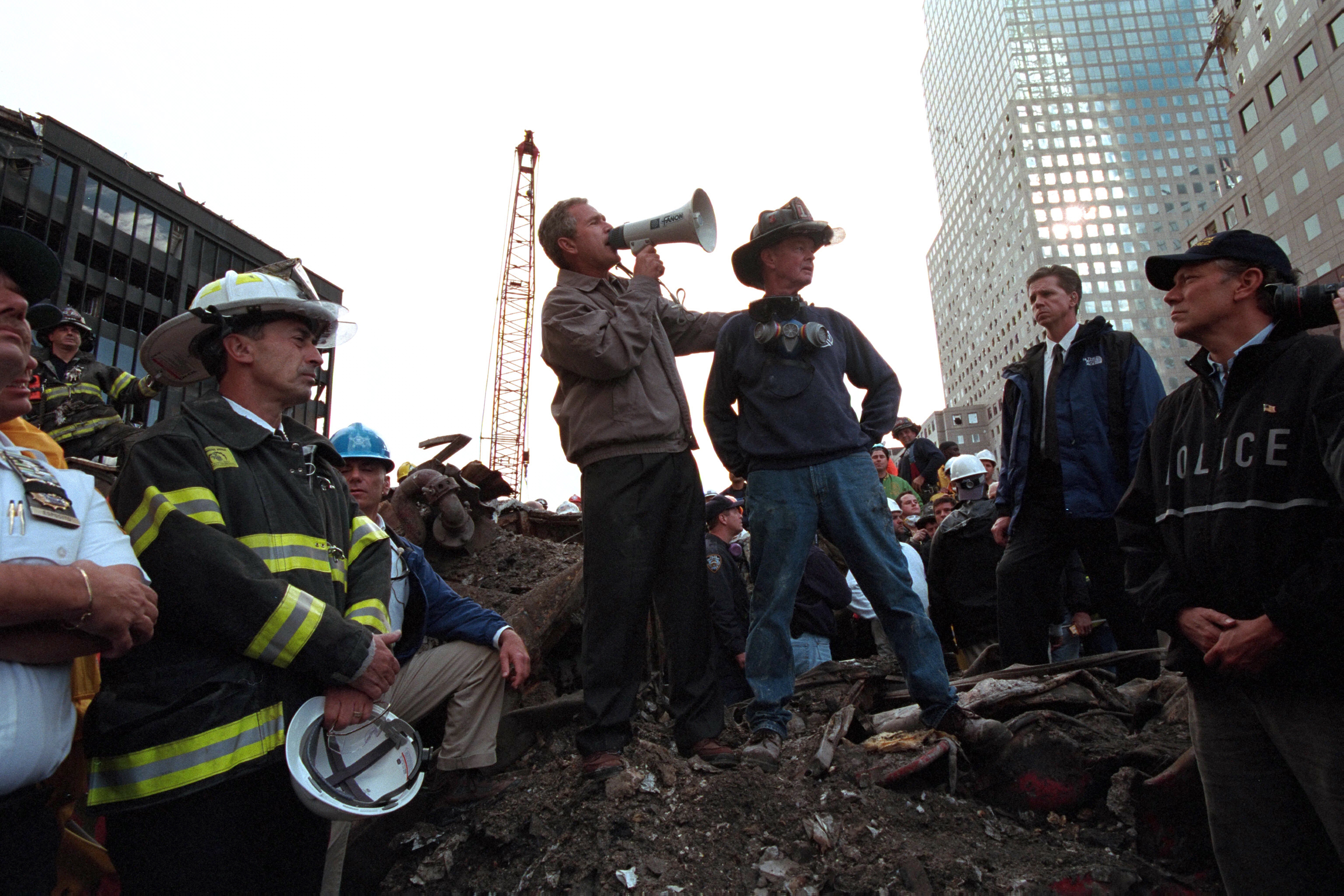
U.S. President Bush addresses rescue workers at Ground Zero in New York, after September 11 attacks: "I can hear you. The rest of the world hears you. And the people who knocked these buildings down will hear all of us soon."

Following the 9/11 attacks, Congress passed the Authorization for Use of Military Force Against Terrorists, authorizing the president "all necessary and appropriate force against the nations, organizations, or persons he determines planned, authorized, committed, or aided the terrorist attacks that occurred on September 11, 2001." This act resulted in the 2001 invasion of Afghanistan, in President George W. Bush's broader global war on terrorism. The objective of the 2001 invasion, known as Operation Enduring Freedom, was to remove the Islamic fundamentalist Taliban lead government from power in Afghanistan, and to capture top level al-Qaeda leaders, including its founder Osama bin Laden. The invasion, fought in conjunction with the U.S.'s NATO allies, began on October 7, 2001, quickly leading to the overthrow of the Taliban government and implementation of Hamid Karzai as Afghanistan's interim president. In early 2002, after the Battle of Tora Bora and success with Operation Anaconda, the United States began focusing on military intervention in Iraq, shifting military and intelligence resources away from Afghanistan in the war on terror, with U.S. Secretary of Defense Donald Rumsfeld stating in May 2003 that the "major combat" in the conflict was over. With the approval of the new Afghan Constitution by the Loya jirga and election of President Karzai in 2004, Afghanistan later held its first parliamentary elections in over 30 years in 2005.

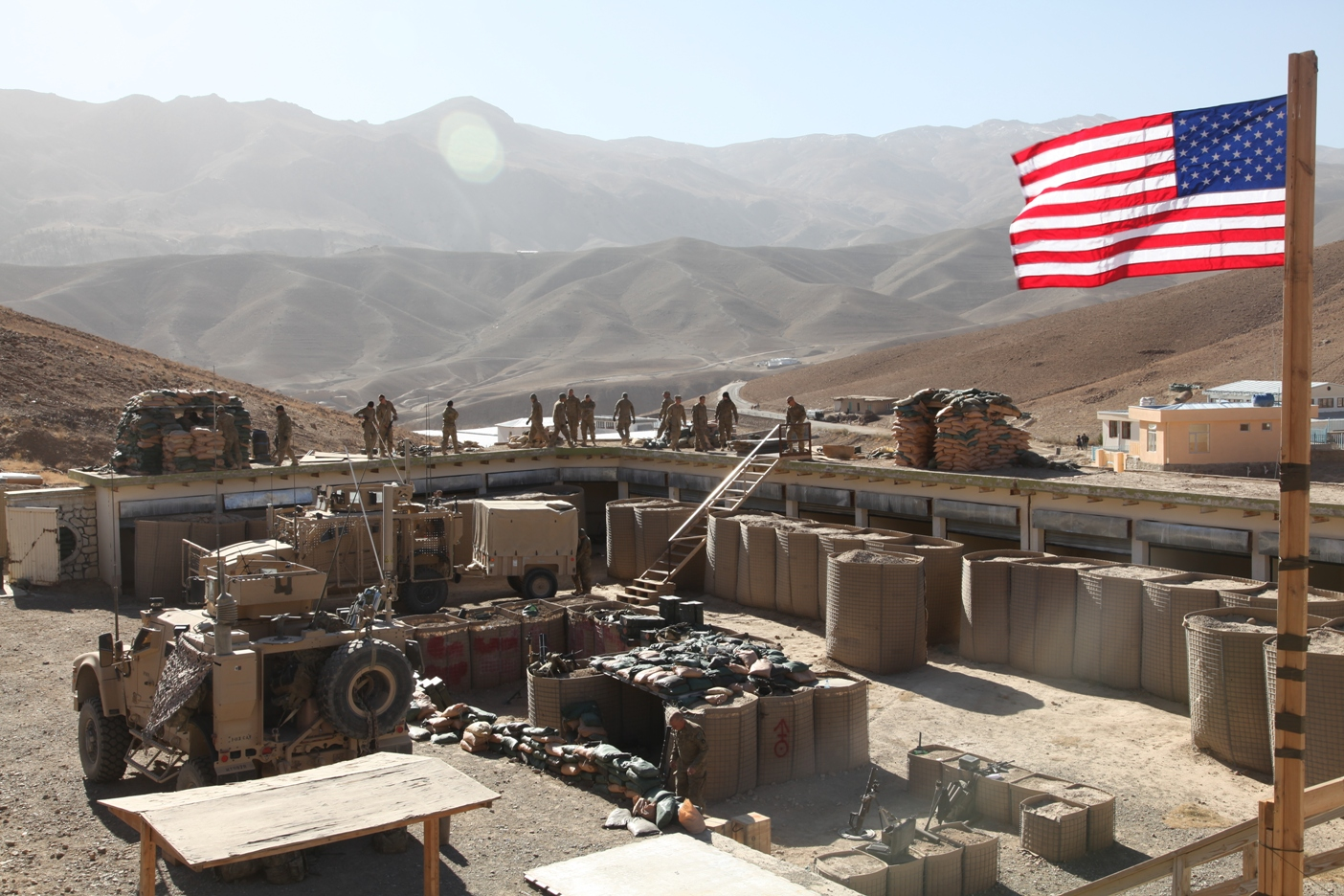
A U.S. military base in Afghanistan, 2010

With a total of 22,000 U.S. troops deployed in Afghanistan by May 2006, the U.S. joined in the ISAF lead Operation Mountain Thrust. In the attempt to quell the Taliban insurgency in southern Afghanistan, more than 1,000 insurgents and 150 ISAF troops were killed in the two-month operation, being the bloodiest period since the start of the war in 2001. With ISAF assuming complete command of security forces in Afghanistan in October 2006, the U.S. saw mounting skepticism from European allies over the war at the 2006 Riga summit. U.S.–Afghan diplomatic relations began to flare after the August 2008 Azizabad airstrike in Herat Province, which killed 91 civilians, including 60 children and 15 women. The attack sparked protest over "collateral damage"; with a 40% increase in civilian deaths in 2008.

In September 2008 President Bush announced he would shift 4,500 US Armed Forces troops from Iraq to the conflict in Afghanistan. This was followed with recently elected President Barack Obama announcing in February 2009 that the United States would deploy an additional 17,000 troops to Afghanistan. The Obama administration also later announced a "troop surge" of an additional 30,000 US military forces to be deployed in the summer of 2010, and to begin withdrawals of the 100,000 total US troops in July 2011. With the surge in effect, the NATO-led International Security Assistance Force (ISAF) launched Operation Moshtarak, an offensive determined to eliminate Taliban insurgents from Helmand Province. At 15,000 troops, it was the largest joint operation of the war.

After a 2010 profile on US Army general and ISAF Commander Stanley McChrystal was published in the magazine Rolling Stone, McChrystal was forced to resign from his position after making controversial remarks about Obama administration officials. President Obama then announced ISAF to be commanded by General David Petraeus.

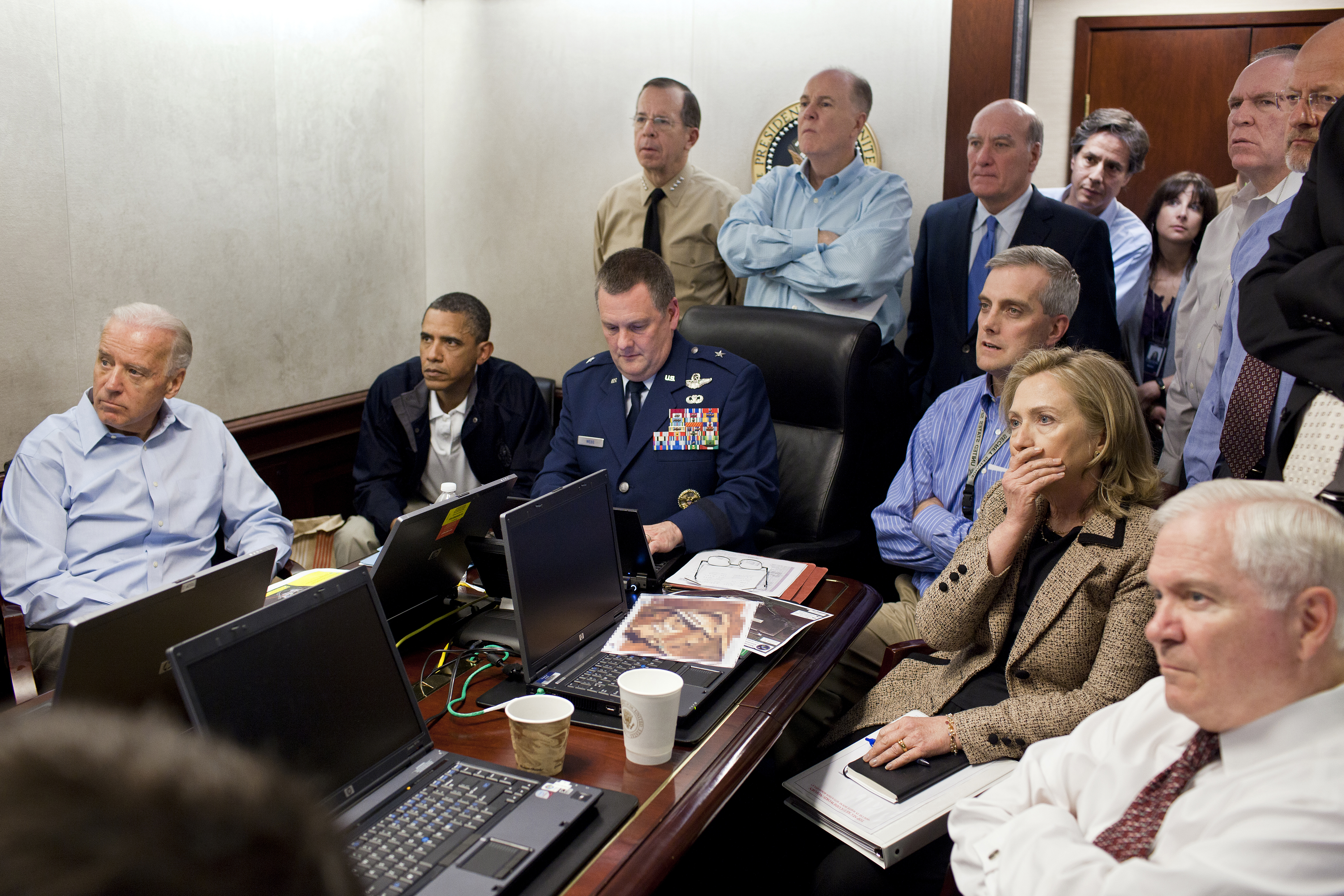
The US national security team gathered in the White House Situation Room to monitor the progress of Operation Neptune Spear, which resulted in the death of Osama bin Laden.

On May 1, 2011, President Barack Obama announced that the US conducted an operation that killed al-Qaeda leader Osama bin Laden at his compound in Abbottabad, Pakistan. The announcement drew worldwide praise, with spontaneous celebrations at Ground Zero, Times Square, and outside of the White House. The raid on bin Laden's compound in Abbottabad led to a rise in diplomatic tensions between the US and Pakistan. With civilian deaths from the United States' drone program in so-called "signature strikes", the 2011 NATO attack in Pakistan, which led to the deaths of 24 Pakistani military officers, and the closure of NATO supply lines to neighboring Afghanistan, Pakistan–United States relations remain fractured as a result of the war on terror.

In mid-2011 Obama announced the start of the withdrawal of the additional 33,000 troops deployed from the 2010 troop surge. By December 2011, the first round of 10,000 troops were withdrawn, with the second round of 23,000 troops later withdrawn in September 2012.

As of February 2014 a total of 2,307 US troops were killed and 19,656 injured due to the Afghanistan War. Estimates from the Costs of Wars Project based at Brown University's Watson Institute for International Studies also suggest that between 16,725 and 19,013 Afghan civilians died as a result of the war.

The International Security Assistance Force ceased combat operations and was disbanded in December 2014, with a small number of troops remaining behind in an advisory role as part of ISAF's successor organization, the Resolute Support Mission. Unable to eliminate the Taliban through military means, coalition forces (and separately, the Afghan government led by Ashraf Ghani) turned to diplomacy to end the conflict.

=== Iraq War ===
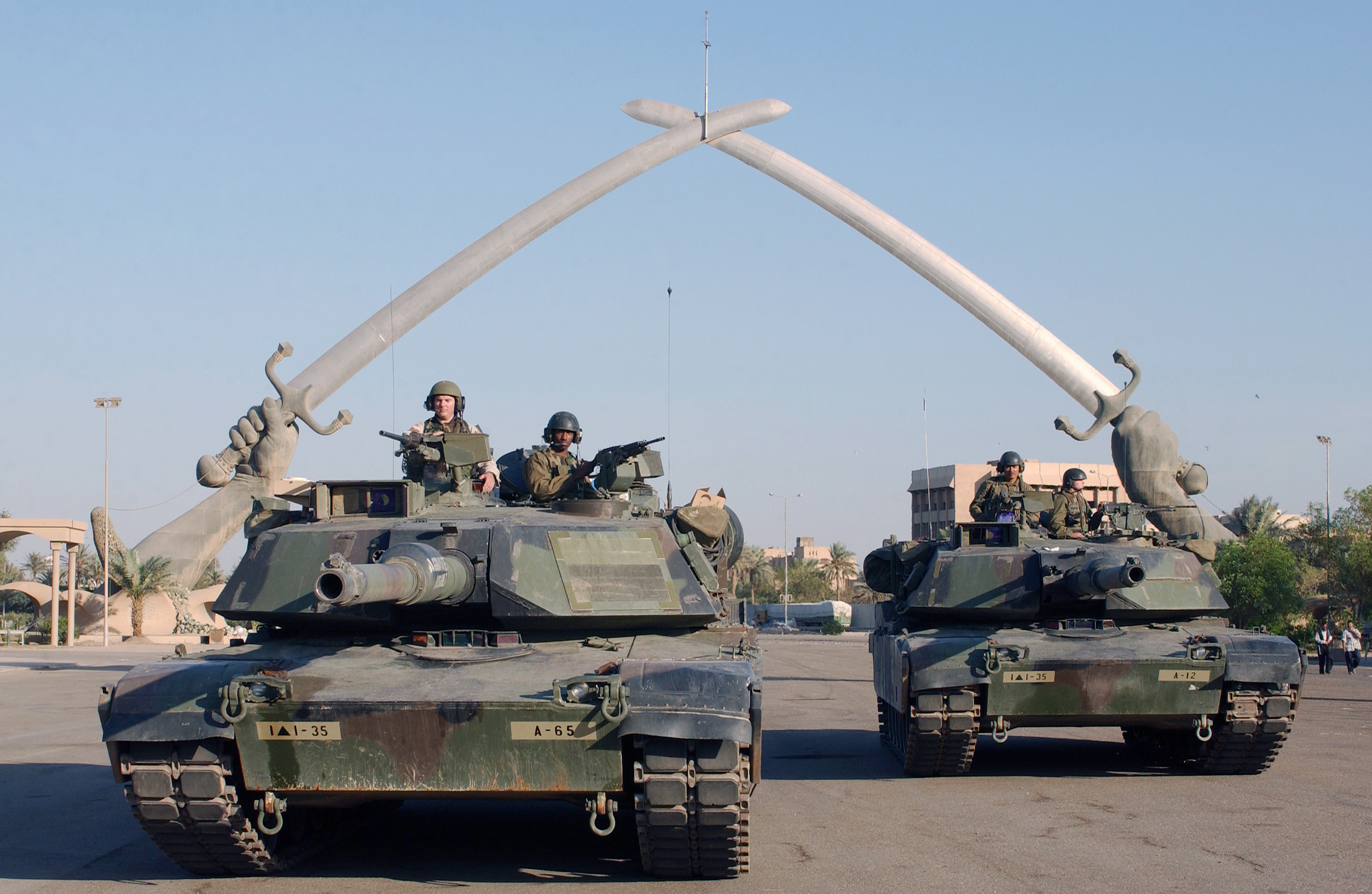
U.S. Army M1A1 Abrams tanks pose for a photo under the "Hands of Victory" in Ceremony Square, Baghdad, Iraq.

In his State of the Union address in January 2002, President George W. Bush called Iran, Iraq, and North Korea an "axis of evil". The Bush administration later began making a public case for an invasion of Iraq, accusing them of violating the 1991 UN-imposed ceasefire, supporting terrorism and being in possession of weapons of mass destruction (later, the latter of these accusations were proved to be false, and the first two are considered very dubious by most historians).

Some important allies of the U.S., including India, Japan, Turkey, New Zealand, France, Germany, and Canada, did not believe that the evidence for the President's accusations was well-founded enough to justify a full-scale invasion, especially as military personnel were still needed in Afghanistan. The UN Security Council did not approve of the invasion, and the U.S. therefore provided most of the forces in the invasion of Iraq. With the support of a coalition whose major partners included the United Kingdom, Australia, Poland and Spain, Iraq was invaded on March 20, 2003.

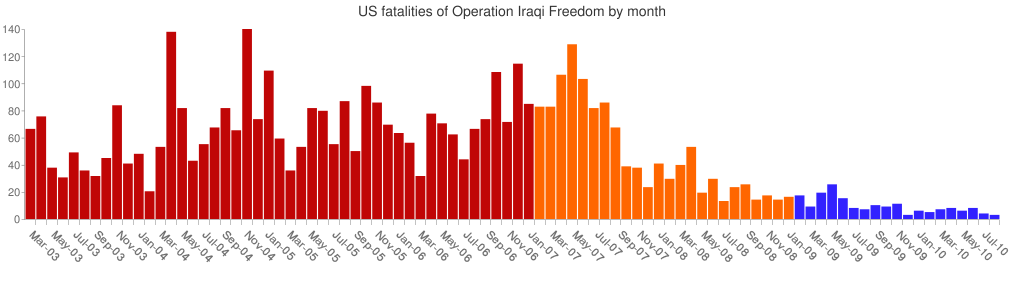
A graph of U.S. troops killed in the Iraq War. The orange months are post-troop surge and the blue months are under the Obama administration. The graph does not include those killed after July 2010.

After six weeks of combat between the coalition and the Iraqi army, the invading forces had secured control of multiple key regions; Hussein had fled his palace, his regime clearly over; on May 1, President Bush declared, under a sign reading "mission accomplished", that major ground operations were at an end. Saddam Hussein's sons Qusay and Uday were killed by U.S. forces; Saddam himself was captured in December 2003 and taken into custody. Nevertheless, fighting with the Iraqi insurgency continued and escalated through the 2004 U.S. national elections and beyond.

With casualties increasing and the cost of the invasion and reconstruction of Iraq estimated at over $200 billion, the war has lost about one-third of its supporters in the U.S. since the end of major operations was announced. Contemporary polls suggested that international displeasure with the United States was at an all-time high, with a majority of people in Europe believing that the country was too powerful and acted mainly in self-interest, and a vast majority in predominantly Muslim nations believing that the United States was arrogant, belligerent, or hateful to Islam.

As the situation in Iraq became increasingly difficult and deadly, policymakers began looking for new options. This led to the formation of the Iraq Study Group, a nonpartisan commission chaired by James Baker and Lee H. Hamilton. This produced a variety of proposals; some of the more notable ones were to seek decreased US presence in Iraq, increased engagement with neighboring countries, and greater attention to resolving other local conflicts, such as the Israeli–Palestinian conflict. The recommendations were generally ignored, and instead, President Bush ordered a surge of troops to Iraq in 2007 and 2008. Violence in the country declined in 2008 and 2009, and the US combat role ended in August 2010. US forces were withdrawn in large numbers in 2009 and 2010, and the war was declared formally over in December 2011.

== Domestic terrorism ==
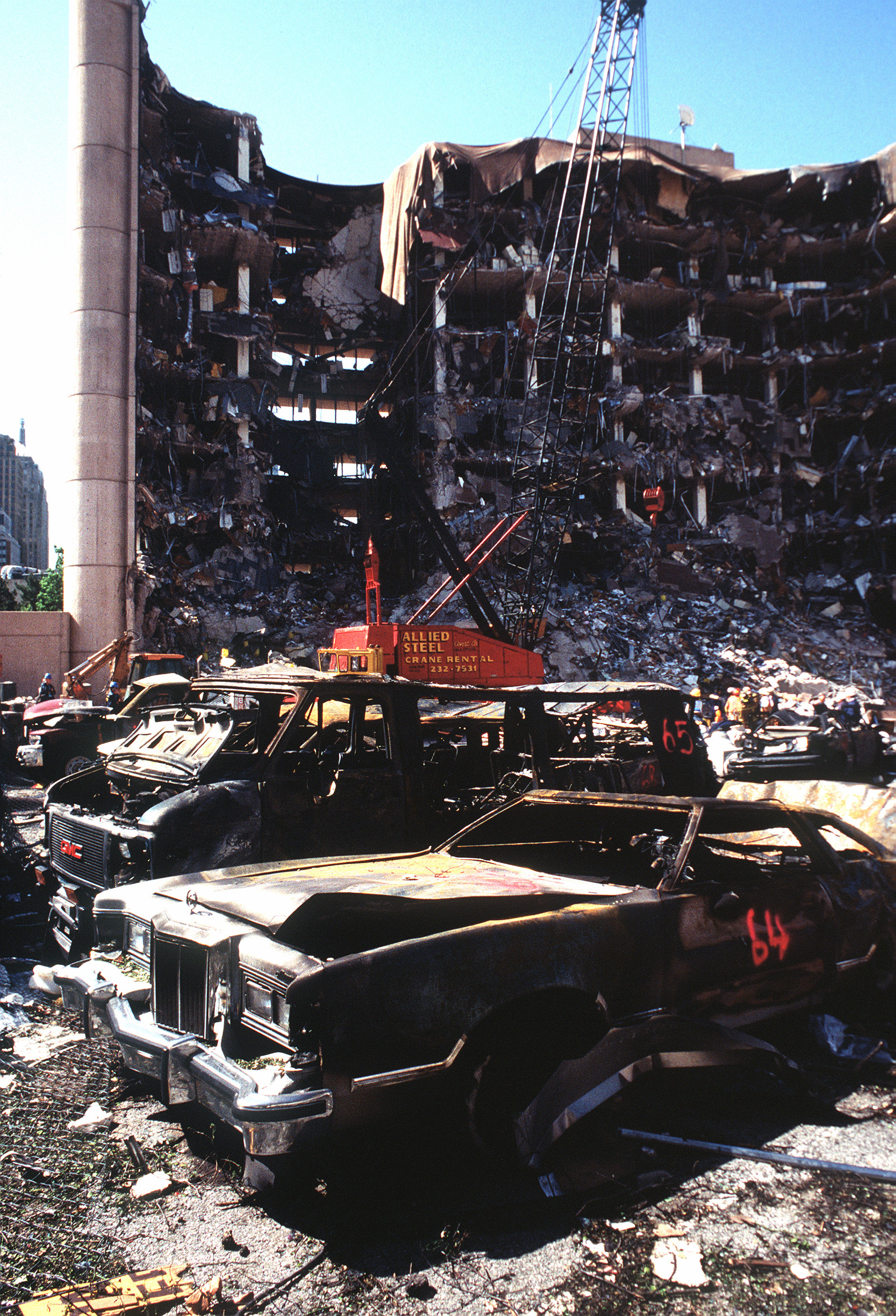
Aftermath of the Oklahoma City bombing (1995)

The 1990s and 2000s (decade) became known for several incidents of domestic terrorism, usually perpetrated by those dissatisfied with actions of the federal government, big business, or other aspects of American society.

Throughout the 1970s and 1980s, a mysterious man known in the media as the "Unabomber" sent mail bombs to figures in the academic and airline industries for various reasons. After a lull, he began another mail bombing campaign in earnest, beginning in 1993. Two people were killed in the mid-1990s and an exhaustive and expensive investigation by the FBI coupled with intense national media interest in the story resulted in the identification and arrest of the perpetrator Theodore Kaczynski, who was sentenced to life in prison.

On April 19, 1995, a truck bomb was detonated outside the Alfred P. Murrah Federal Building in Oklahoma City, Oklahoma, killing 168 people and injuring over 600. The bombing became the deadliest act of domestic terrorism in the United States and led to sweeping reforms in United States federal building security. The attack's perpetrator, Timothy McVeigh, was an anti-government extremist who used the Waco Siege and Ruby Ridge incidents as justification for his retaliation against the federal government. While McVeigh wanted to specifically target the federal agencies involved in the Waco siege, such as the ATF and DEA, the bombing killed many innocent civilians, including 19 children. McVeigh was executed in 2001 and his accomplice Terry Nichols was sentenced to life in prison.

In July 1996, in the midst of the 1996 Summer Olympics at Centennial Olympic Park in Atlanta, Georgia, a homemade bomb was detonated, resulting in the deaths of 2 people and injuring over 100. This was followed by similar attacks at two abortion clinics and a lesbian nightclub. In 2003, suspect Eric Robert Rudolph was arrested and sentenced in 2005 to five life sentences for these attacks.

In 2001, only days after the September 11 attacks, letters laced with anthrax were sent to several individuals, including prominent news personalities and government officials. The letters killed 5 people and infected a further 17. This incident of bioterrorism was initially blamed on international terrorist organization al-Qaeda, but in 2008, was determined to stem from a Maryland scientist by the name of Bruce Edward Ivins, who committed suicide before he could be prosecuted.

== Societal trends ==
A makeshift memorial in tribute to the victims of the Northern Illinois University shooting, one of many school shootings that afflicted the United States

=== Crime and violence ===
The crime epidemic that had begun during the late 1960s finally reached its climax in the early 1990s before starting a steady decline during the Clinton administration. Nevertheless, ongoing addiction (involving sales of marijuana and cocaine) continued to be a major factor in crime in the United States. The overall rate of major crimes fell during the period. In 2009, the FBI estimated 1,318,000 violent crimes occurred nationwide, 1,425,000 in 2000, down from the 1991 level of 1,912,000. Measured per capita, this was a 43% drop in violent crime rates. At the time, it was believed that crime had declined because of stricter judicial sentencing practices, the implementation of Three Strikes laws, improving law enforcement technology that made it easier to catch felons, and the end of the crack epidemic. But later statistical assessments ruled out most of these explanations, and tended to find that factors such as greater prosperity, lower alcohol consumption, generation-specific cultural effects, improved security technology, and decreases in leaded petrol had probably caused most of the decline, while public policy conversation began to regret the incarcerative policies of the preceding decades.

In the 1990s and 2000s (decade), a number of highly publicized assaults against lesbian, gay, bisexual, and transgender people occurred in the United States. The most well known of these was the murder of Matthew Shepard in Wyoming after two young men kidnapped, tortured, and murdered him in 1998. In 2009, Congress passed the Matthew Shepard Act, which extended the hate crime law to women, the disabled, and gays, lesbians, bisexuals, and transsexuals.

A spate of school shootings rocked the country in the late 1990s and the 2000s, the most notable being the 1999 Columbine High School massacre, that left 15 people dead, including both perpetrators Eric Harris and Dylan Klebold. The actions of Harris and Klebold would go on to influence future mass killers. Others include the Westside Middle School shooting (1998), the Red Lake shootings (2005), the West Nickel Mines School shooting (2006), the Virginia Tech shooting (2007), and the Northern Illinois University shooting (2008). Those shootings led to increased debate over gun politics and media violence, as well as an increased focus on mental health, school safety, and anti-bullying.

The Capital Region was struck by the Beltway sniper attacks, a series of sniper attacks on civilians and federal workers by two gunmen over a month-long period in October 2002. The attackers killed 10 people and injured three. Two men were arrested and convicted.

During the 2000s a series of high-profile child abduction cases occurred, including Danielle van Dam (2002), Samantha Runnion (2002), Elizabeth Smart (2002), Carlie Brucia (2004), and Jessica Lunsford (2005). These incidents led to a public outcry and demands for stricter laws against sex offenders, the most notable of which was Jessica's Law.

In 1992 riots occurred in Los Angeles after four police officers were acquitted in the beating of black motorist Rodney King. The riots occurred primarily in South Central Los Angeles, a predominantly black and Hispanic area. Fifty-five people were killed and more than 2000 were injured. 3,600 fires were set, destroying over 1,000 buildings and widespread looting occurred, especially of businesses owned by Korean Americans. In all, nearly $1 billion in damage was caused.

In November 2009 US Army major Nidal Malik Hasan killed 13 fellow soldiers and injured 30 in the Fort Hood shooting in Killeen, Texas. While the act was called terrorism by some due to Hasan's Muslim heritage, the attack was ruled out by the FBI to have been perpetrated by a terrorist organization. On September 16, 2013, another mass murder on a US military base surpassed the incident when a former navy reservist fired a shotgun at the Washington Navy Yard Shooting, killing 12 civilian contractors and injured four more at the headquarters of the Naval Sea Systems Command (NAVSEA) in Southeast Washington, D.C.

On January 8, 2011, U.S. Representative Gabby Giffords was the target of an assassination attempt, when a gunman went on a shooting spree, critically injuring Giffords, killing federal judge John Roll and five other people, and wounding 14 others.

On July 20, 2012, a man shot 70 people (up to that time, the highest number of victims of any mass shooting in American history) at a movie theater in Aurora, Colorado, killing 12 and injuring 58 others.

On April 15, 2013, two bombs exploded near the finish line of the Boston Marathon in Boston, Massachusetts, killing three people and injuring over 280. Three days later, suspects Tamerlan and Dzhokhar Tsarnaev led the Boston Police Department on a high speed chase, after killing one officer at the Massachusetts Institute of Technology. Tamerlan was killed in a shootout with police and a seriously injured Dzhokhar was taken into custody in nearby Watertown the following day.

On December 2, 2015, in the 2015 San Bernardino attack, 14 people were killed and 22 were injured in a mass shooting at a workplace Christmas party at the Inland Regional Center in San Bernardino, California. Both a workplace shooting and a terrorist attack, the incident was perpetrated by Rizwan Farook, a healthcare worker who was employed at the facility, and his wife Tashfeen Malik. The pair were US citizens of Pakistani descent who had become radicalized and had expressed a commitment to jihadism prior to the attack. The attack also included an attempted bombing. Four hours after the attack, the perpetrators were killed by police in a shootout that left two officers injured.

=== Demographics ===
The population of the United States would increase between each of the decennial censuses held each 10 years.

Population of the United States (1990, 2000 and 2010 decennial censuses)
Year	Total population	Change (%) from previous decennial census
1990	248,709,873	9.8%
2000	281,421,906	13.1%
2010	308,745,538	9.7%

=== Technology ===
From the early 1990s to the mid-2010s, vast technology changes would be seen in the United States such as: the number of wireless phones surpassing the number of landline phones, Internet usage becoming common among the population along with a large expansion in the number of actual internet users.

The usage of landline phones would decline while that of wireless phones would increase. The percentage of American adults having wireless instead of landline would be surpassed in December 2008 and the percent of homes being solely wireless would surpass those having both wireless and landline in June 2015.

==== Internet usage ====
According to Our World in Data the usage of the internet grew during this time period going from 2.98 million internet users in 1991 to 281.59 million by 2016. 2008 would mark the first time that the country with the most internet users (the number of people who use the internet) was not the United States as China surpassed the country that year. Dial-up internet was initially the most common way to connect to the internet but was later surpassed by broadband internet.

Number of internet users by year in the United States
Year	Number of users (million)
1991	2,983,260
1992	4,476,134
1993	5,966,169
1994	12,909,458
1995	24,774,406
1996	44,473,576
1997	59,113,944
1998	83,093,130
1999	99,941,040
2000	121,261,010
2001	139,526,820
2002	168,763,680
2003	178,864,930
2004	189,603,260
2005	200,992,860
2006	205,918,290
2007	226,383,170
2008	225,678,050
2009	218,696,660
2010	223,000,910
2011	219,023,780
2012	236,885,150
2013	228,559,090
2014	235,874,220
2015	243,141,000
2016	281,594,620

Internet based services that had their debuts were such as: Uber (originally known as UberCab until rebranding in October 2010) in June 2010 which initially operated in San Francisco, and Airbnb in 2008. Social media platforms from or based in the United States that launched included Instagram in October 2010, and Snapchat in 2011 by 3 Stanford University students.

==== Space exploration ====
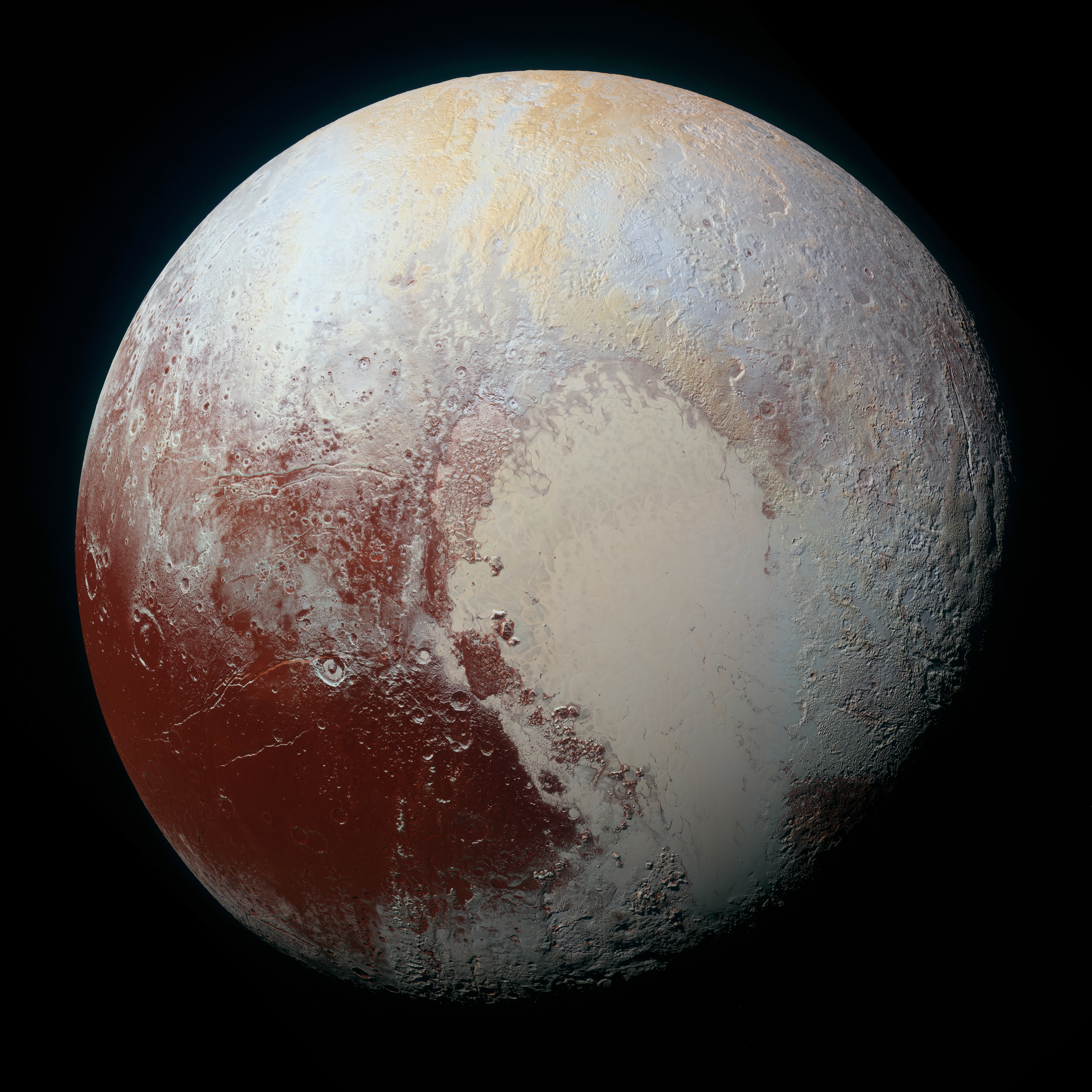
A photo of Pluto taken by New Horizons during its flyby on July 14, 2015

A number of different events would happen pertaining to the United States relating to space exploration during this period. The United States would participate in the now Russian Mir space station sending 7 astronauts to the station between 1994 and 1998 in 10 separate Space Shuttle missions. However Mir was later deorbited in 2001 and replaced with the International Space Station.

The Space Shuttle program would be continued. In 2003, Space Shuttle Columbia burned up in the atmosphere upon its reentry to Earth. After the shuttle burned up killing all 7 crew members an official governmental investigation was carried out and President Bush addressed the country about the shuttle. The Space Shuttle program was retired in 2011 doing its final flight that year.

Voyager 1, launched in 1977 by NASA became the first spacecraft to enter interstellar space in 2012. While Voyager 2 (also launched in 1977 by NASA) entered interstellar space in 2018 becoming the second spacecraft to do so. The first flyby of Pluto ever was done by NASA's New Horizons probe in 2015. The Dawn space probe launched by NASA in 2007 visited the asteroid Vesta in 2011 being the first spacecraft to orbit an asteroid before later leaving next year to visit the dwarf planet Ceres entering its orbit in 2015. Dawn would be the first space craft to visit and orbit a dwarf planet.

=== Family ===
The divorce rate which was previously much higher in the 1980s and 1990s after divorce became much easier to do, started to lower in the early 21st century with it declining. Starting in 2004 the percentage of adults who were from 18 to 29 and happened to be single or never married grew while the number of those who were "currently married" declined.

In terms of marriage, the median age increased for both men and women which was an ongoing trend since the late 1950s. Meanwhile, the number of marriages per 1,000 people declined between 1991 and 2016, along with the percentage of households where the head of house was married.

A new common practice relating to families that came about was gender reveal parties where the sex of the baby is revealed which became popular starting in 2008 after a blogger posted about doing it. Usually with gender reveal parties if it is a boy the color blue is used and for girls pink is used.

=== Recreation and leisure ===
The United States hosted the 1996 Summer Olympics in Atlanta. During the 1996 Summer Olympics, the United States won the most medals in total. The United States also hosted the 2002 Winter Olympics in Salt Lake City. However compared to the 1996 Summer Olympics, the United States won the 2nd highest amount of medals overall.

== Disasters ==
=== Natural disasters ===
On August 24, 1992, the category-five Hurricane Andrew made landfall in South Florida, devastating the southern suburbs of Miami, including Homestead, Kendall, and Cutler Ridge. Two days later, the storm made landfall again in a sparsely populated part of Louisiana, with relatively less damage than in Florida. The storm killed 26 people directly, 39 indirectly. With $26 billion in damage, it became the costliest storm in history at that time. The storm was known for a number of controversies including the sluggish federal response, which may have impacted President George H. W. Bush's image on domestic issues, as well as poor housing construction which may have led to such high levels of destruction.

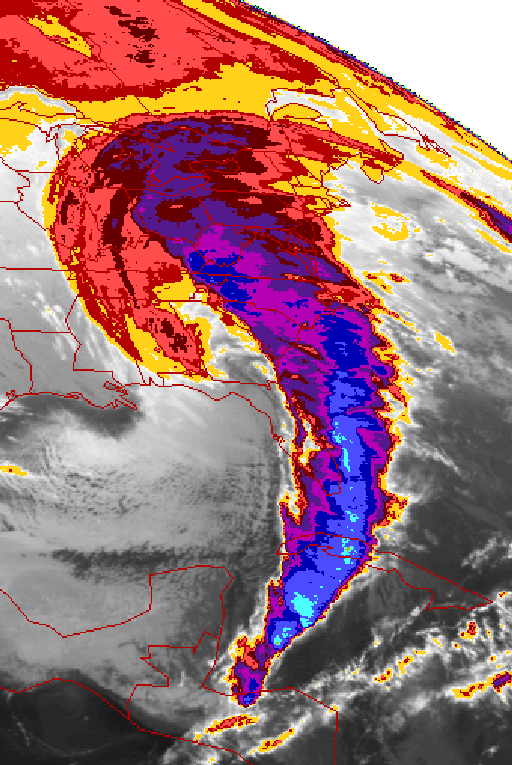
Satellite image of the "Storm of the Century"

In March 1993, a massive storm, known as the "Storm of the Century" or "Superstorm" struck the Eastern Seaboard of the United States. The storm set low pressure records; produced hurricane-force winds, storm surge, and killer tornadoes in Florida; and produced snowfall up to 2 feet (61 cm) across many portions of the Eastern United States. The storm was particularly crippling to the Southern United States, where places like Birmingham, Alabama received one-and-a-half feet of snow and record low temperatures, highly unusual for the region. In all, 300 deaths were attributed to the storm and $6 billion in damage was caused.

The Great Flood of 1993 affected the Midwestern United States in the spring and summer of that year, devastating large portions of the Mississippi and Missouri River Valleys and their tributaries. Multiple small towns were devastated and agricultural losses were significant. 10,000 homes were destroyed and 15 million acres (61,000 km^{2}) of agricultural lands were inundated. 50 people perished in the floods and $15 billion in damage was done.

In the early morning hours of January 17, 1994, the San Fernando Valley region of Los Angeles was hit by a 6.7 magnitude earthquake, known as the "Northridge earthquake". The quake killed more than 70 people and injured 9,000. Most of the fatalities were attributed to collapsed buildings, parking structures, or freeways. Striking an urban area, it was very destructive, causing $20 billion in damage.

In July 1995, the city of Chicago was hit by a heat wave that had severe repercussions. During a five-day spell from July 12 to 16, the high temperature hovered from the mid 90s to the mid 100s. The heat index pushed 120 degrees on multiple days. The heat wave resulted in the deaths of over 700 people, a number of whom were black, elderly, or poor. The event brought increased attention to these segments of the population and the importance of reaching out to them during heat waves, as well as the concept of the urban heat island effect, in which urban environments exacerbate heat and humidity levels. Additionally, power failures and lack of adequate warning and general preparedness aggravated the situation and may have contributed to such high fatalities.

In January 1996, the Blizzard of 1996 affected the Northeastern and Mid-Atlantic United States, dumping up to 36 inches (91 cm) of snow on multiple areas, crippling major American cities like Washington, D.C., Baltimore, Philadelphia, New York City, and Boston. The storm killed 150 people and caused $3 billion in damages.

On May 3, 1999, a violent tornado outbreak struck the Southern Great Plains, predominantly Oklahoma. The most destructive tornado was an F5 tornado that struck Oklahoma City and the suburb of Moore. The tornado is one of the most prominent examples of a tornado striking a major urban area and became the first tornado to incur over $1 billion in damages. In all, the outbreak resulted in 50 deaths and over 600 injuries.

In 2004, four hurricanes—Charley, Frances, Ivan, and Jeanne—struck the state of Florida in a one-month timespan, resulting in over 100 U.S. deaths and nearly $50 billion in damage combined. Out of the four hurricanes, Ivan was the deadliest in the U.S., while Charley was the most destructive.

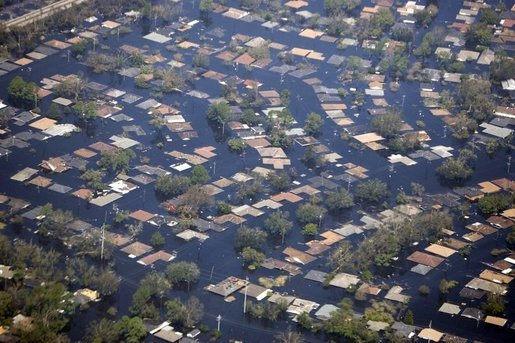
Flooding due to Hurricane Katrina

2005 brought the second-most active Atlantic hurricane season in recorded history, only beaten by 2020. In August 2005, the powerful Hurricane Katrina struck the Gulf Coast region. Katrina broke the levees of New Orleans, Louisiana and flooded 80% of the low-lying city. Extensive devastation and flooding also occurred from Mobile, Alabama west to Beaumont, Texas, with the Mississippi coastline especially hard hit. At least 1,800 people died in the worst domestic calamity since the 1928 Okeechobee hurricane. Port facilities, oil rigs and refineries in the Gulf region were damaged, further increasing already high U.S. fuel prices. Residents of New Orleans, many of whom were impoverished and unable (or unwilling) to evacuate before the storm, were trapped for days by the flood waters. Tens of thousands had to be rescued by the U.S. military from their rooftops or from unsanitary and dangerous shelters in public buildings. State and local authorities were overwhelmed by the scale of the events. Their response to the disaster, as well the federal government's, were harshly criticized by legislators and citizens who saw in the confusion a dangerous lack of readiness and inability to preserve public safety. President Bush promised that the federal government would underwrite the rebuilding of New Orleans and other storm-damaged areas, the cost of which was estimated to run as high as $200 billion. Only weeks after Katrina, Hurricane Rita struck the Texas/Louisiana border in September. Rita caused the largest evacuation in U.S. history, as millions of people fled the Houston area, as well as portions of Louisiana. Rita resulted in over 100 fatalities, the vast majority of which were indirect, occurring during the evacuation or in the aftermath of the storm. Additionally, $10 billion in damage was attributed to Rita. Later in the season, Hurricane Wilma struck the state of Florida in October 2005, killing 35 people and doing $20 billion worth of damage. The storm yielded the lowest pressure value ever recorded in history before making landfall in Florida, making it the most intense storm on record.

On Super Tuesday in February 2008, in the midst of heated primary elections in multiple states, a destructive tornado outbreak hit the Mid-South region, spawning dangerous nighttime twisters across the region. A total of 87 tornadoes were reported. Over 60 people were killed across Tennessee, Kentucky, Arkansas, and Alabama and hundreds were injured. Losses exceeded $1 billion. The outbreak was the deadliest outbreak in the US in 23 years, and brought renewed attention to the dangers of nighttime tornadoes, winter tornadoes, and the vulnerability of populations in the Southern United States.

In September 2008, after two straight years of not being affected by a serious hurricane, Hurricane Gustav caused $18 billion in damage in Louisiana, and a few weeks later, the Galveston, Texas and Houston, Texas areas were devastated by Hurricane Ike with over $31 billion in damage, making Ike the third most destructive hurricane ever to hit the United States behind Hurricanes Andrew and Katrina. Over 100 people were killed. The hurricanes also caused gas prices to spike to around $4 per gallon.

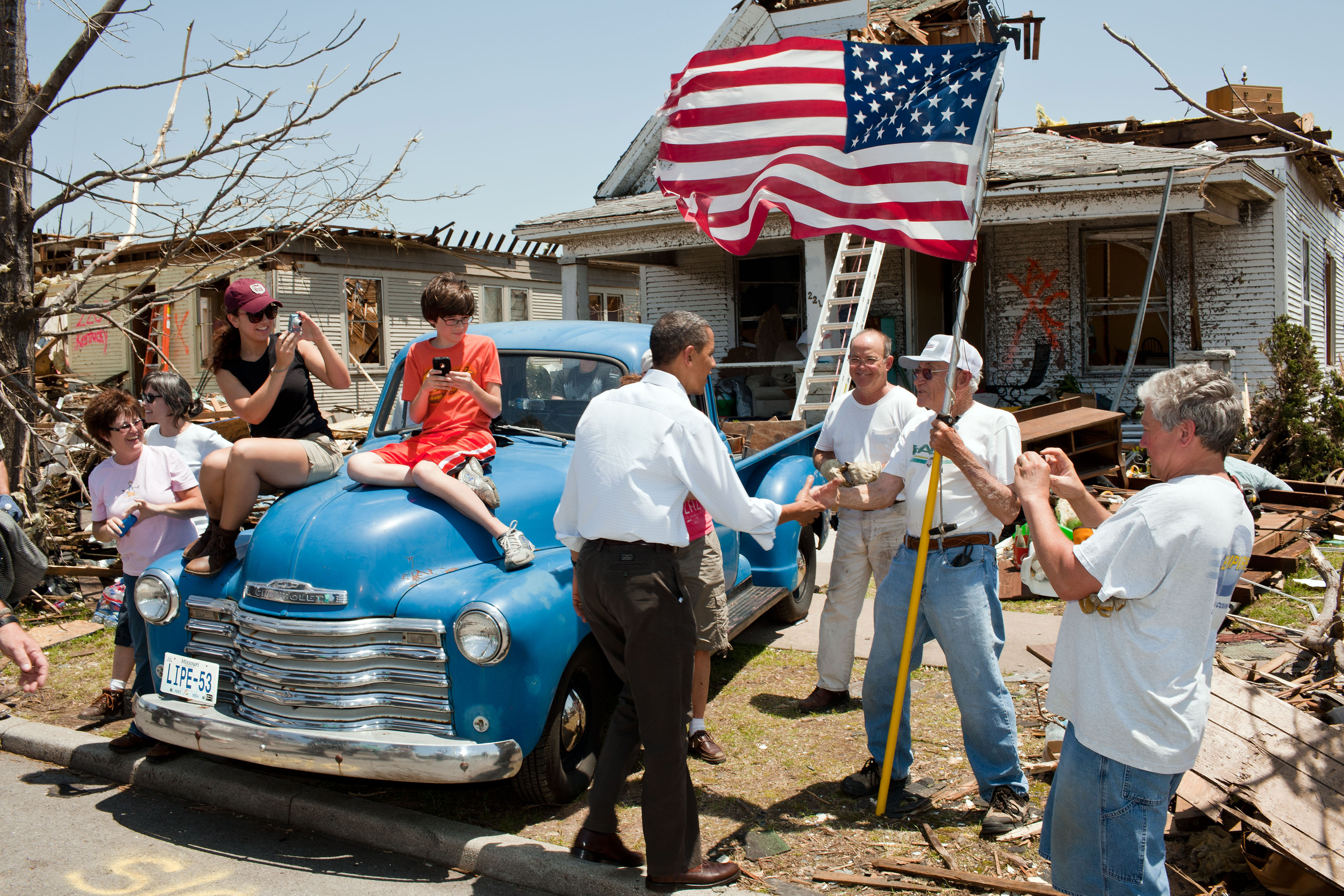
President Barack Obama greets survivors of the devastating 2011 Joplin tornado.

In the spring of 2011, several major tornado outbreaks affected the Central and Southern United States. Forty-three people were killed in a tornado outbreak from April 14–16. Approximately 350+ people were killed in a tornado outbreak from April 25–28, the deadliest US tornado outbreak in 75 years (since the 1936 Tupelo-Gainesville tornado outbreak). States particularly hit hard by the outbreaks included Oklahoma, Arkansas, Mississippi, Tennessee, Georgia, North Carolina, Virginia, and most especially, Alabama, which sustained over 250 fatalities alone. The latter outbreak produced $10 billion in damage, making it the costliest tornado outbreak in history. On May 22 an EF5 tornado devastated Joplin, Missouri, killing 154, injuring over 1,000 people, and causing $1–3 billion in damage, making it the deadliest single US tornado in 64 years and the costliest single tornado of all time.

In August 2011, Hurricane Irene was the first hurricane to make landfall since Ike in 2008, striking the Eastern Seaboard of the United States, making landfalls in North Carolina, New Jersey, and New York. The storm killed at least 45 people and caused $10 billion in damage. The storm was particularly notable for its extensive flooding in the Northeast, and a couple days later, Tropical Storm Lee made landfall in Louisiana, its remnants tracking to the Northeast for even more devastating floods.

In October 2012, Hurricane Sandy struck the East Coast of the United States, making landfall near Atlantic City, New Jersey. The storm knocked out power to millions of people and caused flooding in parts of New York City along with devastation to the Jersey Shore and portions of Long Island and Staten Island. The storm has been blamed for 121 fatalities and is estimated to have caused at least $50 billion in damage.

In May 2013, at least 24 people were killed, 377 people were injured, and $1.5 to $3 billion in damage was caused when an EF5 tornado struck the Oklahoma City suburb of Moore, which was hit by a deadly and destructive F5 tornado only 14 years prior.

=== Other disasters ===
Notable aviation disasters in the 1990s included TWA Flight 800 crashing off the coast of Long Island, en route to Paris, France, on July 17, 1996, due to an explosion of the fuel tank, killing 230 and EgyptAir Flight 990 crashing south of Nantucket, Massachusetts, en route to Cairo, Egypt, on October 31, 1999, due to deliberate crashing by the first officer, killing 217. Shortly after the 9/11 terrorist attacks, the second-deadliest U.S. aviation incident occurred when American Airlines Flight 587 crashed in Queens, New York, en route to the Dominican Republic, on November 12, 2001, due to overuse of rudder controls by the pilot to counteract turbulence, killing 265 (including 5 on the ground).

On February 1, 2003, the Space Shuttle Columbia disintegrated upon re-entry to the Earth over parts of Texas and Louisiana during STS-107, resulting in the deaths of all seven astronauts. The incident resulted from a piece of foam insulation that fell off during launch, which struck the shuttle, creating a hole that allowed hot gases to penetrate the shuttle during re-entry. In the aftermath of the disaster, the Space Shuttle program was suspended for 29 months as NASA investigated the incident and made plans to prevent future tragedies.

On February 17, 2003, a stampede occurred at the E2 nightclub in Chicago, after an incident involving pepper spray, resulting in the deaths of 21 people. Three days later, on February 20, 100 people perished and over 200 were injured in The Station nightclub fire in West Warwick, Rhode Island, when pyrotechnics ignited flammable sound-proofing during a performance by the band Great White. Both incidents brought attention to the need to crack down on building, fire, and safety code violations to prevent future tragedies. A porch collapse that killed 13 and seriously injured 57 in June 2003 in Chicago further emphasized the problems with building code violations in the United States.

On August 1, 2007, the I-35W Mississippi River bridge in Minneapolis collapsed into the Mississippi River, killing 13 people and injuring over 50. The bridge was under construction at the time. The incident brought to attention the need to inspect and rehabilitate the aging infrastructure system in the United States.

The Deepwater Horizon oil rig burns after exploding in April 2010. The disaster led to the largest oil spill in US history.

On April 20, 2010, an offshore oil drilling rig, the Deepwater Horizon, exploded and burned off the coast of Louisiana in the Gulf of Mexico. Dozens of workers fled the flames and were rescued by lifeboats and helicopters, however 11 were killed and 17 were injured in the incident. The rig burned for 36 hours before sinking. On April 24, it was discovered that a damaged wellhead was leaking oil into the Gulf of Mexico at a rapid rate. For approximately 90 days, tens of thousands of barrels of oil leaked into the ocean every day, resulting in the largest oil spill in United States history. The wellhead was successfully contained in mid-July, stopping the flow, and the well was completely sealed on September 18. Despite significant efforts to protect coastlines, the spill had devastating impacts on the environment and the economies of the Gulf Coast states. The Obama administration, and civil settlements with the Justice Department and Gulf Coast states, ordered well operator BP responsible for the $15 billion cleanup costs. The spill resulted in negative public approval ratings of the US government, the Obama administration, and BP, for their handling of the spill, with BP suffering the worst ratings.

== Energy issues ==
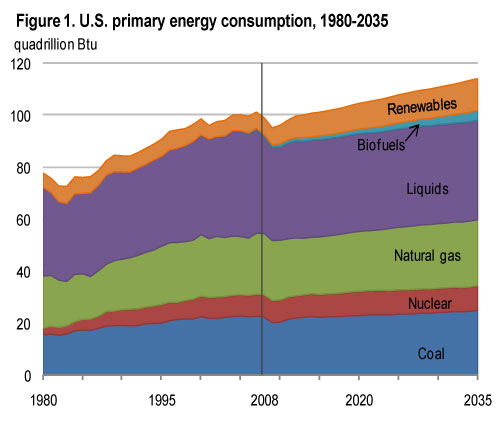
US energy consumption 1980–2008, with projections to 2035

After 1970 the U.S. began importing oil, as consumption kept rising and the nation's oil fields became less productive. Throughout the 1990s the world price of crude oil ranged between $10 and $40, and the average price at the pump did not exceed $1.40. Oil prices tripled after 2002, peaking at $147 in July 2008, about $4 a gallon; the price has continued to fluctuate widely. The theme of "energy independence" led to legislation mandating more fuel efficient autos—even electric vehicles—and more efficient use of energy, ranging from insulation to new light bulbs. Even worse than the high price, was the fear of shortages. A number of proposals and pilot projects for replacement energy sources, from ethanol to wind power and solar power were discussed and, indeed, funded by Congress after 2000. In the economic stimulus package signed by President Obama in early 2009, billions of dollars were allocated for research and development of new energy sources.

While public attention focused on supplies from the Middle East, the main source was Canada. After 2007, new methods of extraction opened up vast new deposits of oil in the Bakken Formation in North Dakota and Montana. As much as two trillion dollars' worth of natural gas is potentially available in the Marcellus Formation deposits located in the historic 19th-century oil fields in Appalachia, stretching from West Virginia through Pennsylvania into western New York. However, there is sharp debate underway regarding the environmental impact on the region's fresh water supply. The question of drilling in the Arctic National Wildlife Refuge (ANWR) was highly controversial, as Republican proposals were blocked by the Democrats in Congress. Republicans in 2008 were campaigning for more offshore drilling, with the slogan "drill, baby, drill", but the 2010 Gulf oil spill put all new drilling on hold.

== Politics ==
=== Clinton administration ===
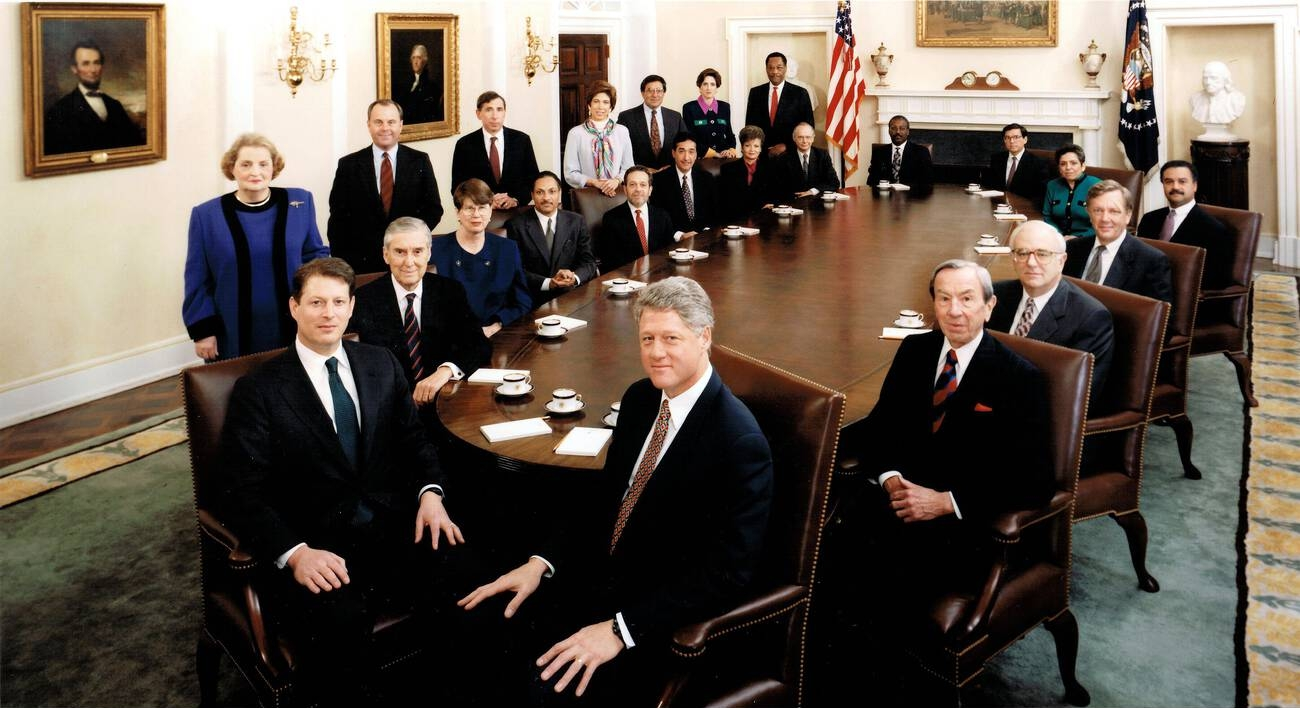
President Clinton's first Cabinet, 1993

Following the success of the First Gulf War, George H. W. Bush enjoyed very high approval ratings as president. However, economic recession and a reneged campaign pledge dogged Bush, sinking his formerly high approval ratings from the high 80s to the lower 40s and upper 30s. In the wake of Bush's political problems, Bill Clinton won the 1992 contest with 43% of the vote in a three-way race against Bush's 38%. Independent candidate Ross Perot tapped the discontent of the electorate with both parties, drawing roughly evenly from both candidates to receive a record 19% of the popular vote, but no electoral votes. Perot's result qualified his Reform Party to receive Federal Election Commission matching funds for campaign contributions in the 1996 election, thus laying the groundwork for another three-way race during the 1996 presidential election.

Aged 46 when he took office in January 1993, Clinton was one of the youngest presidents in US history and the first born after WWII. Historians and political analysts immediately referred to him as marking a "generational shift" in American politics similar to when John F. Kennedy had become the first president born in the 20th century. His promising to focus on and resolve some of the United States' many domestic issues, he entered office with high expectations. Immediately, however, he was hurt when he had to withdraw major nominees (over nonpayment of taxes). Clinton's surgeon general, Joycelyn Elders, attracted controversy over public remarks that "it would be good for parents to teach their children about masturbation". Much of his planned activity was overwhelmed by the intense debate over his proposal to permit gays to serve in the military. In addition, the president had a difficult time gaining the respect of the US military establishment due to having been painted as a Vietnam War draft dodger. The outcome was a new "don't ask, don't tell" compromise policy and loss of initiative in other areas.

One early domestic victory of the Clinton administration was the enactment of the 1994 Assault Weapons Ban. The ban was widely decried by the Republicans, who allowed it to lapse in 2004 while they controlled both Congress and the presidency. Bill Clinton's proposal of a national health care system, championed by his wife Hillary Clinton, ignited a political firestorm on the right, which vigorously opposed it on the general principle that government size should be reduced, not expanded. The proposed system did not survive the debate. However Hillary Clinton did succeed, along with a bipartisan coalition of members of congress, in establishing the Children's Health Insurance Program.

=== Republican Congress ===
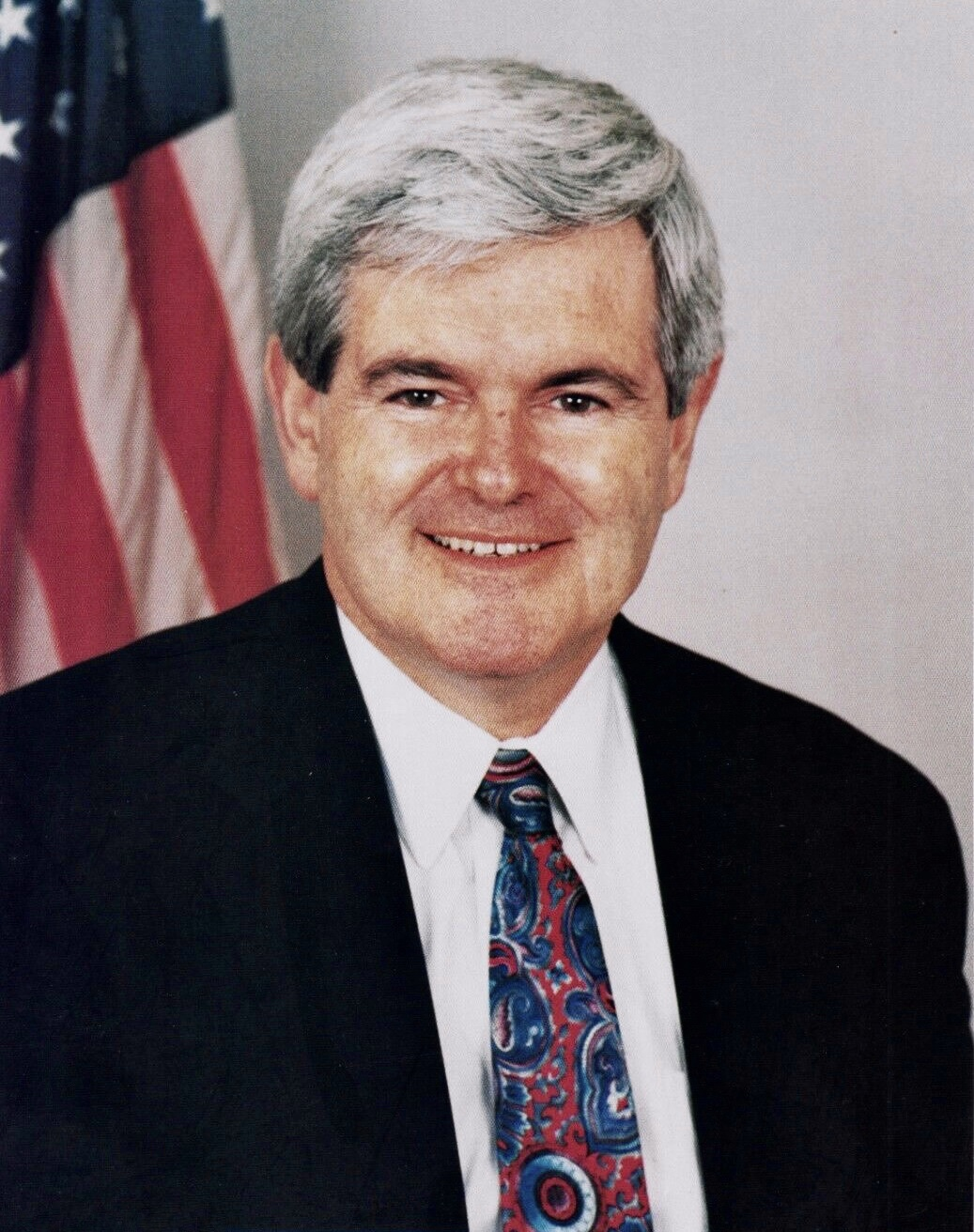
Newt Gingrich, Speaker of the House, 1995–1999

The New Deal, the Great Society, and Watergate helped solidify Democratic control of Congress, but the 1980s and early 1990s were a period of fragmentation of their coalition, when the popularity of Democratic incumbents as constituent servants masked growing disenchantment with Congress' governing capacities. The strongly liberal policies of Clinton's first two years in office were also a cause of controversy, and the Democrats suddenly lost control of the House and the Senate for the first time in four decades in the 1994 midterm elections. Once in power, House Republicans, led by Newt Gingrich, faced the difficulty of learning to govern after 40 years as the minority party while simultaneously pursuing their "Contract with America", which they unveiled on the steps of Congress on September 27, 1994.

Remarks including response to Monica Lewinsky scandal (January 26, 1998)
Bill Clinton making a presentation that ends with a short commentary on the Monica Lewinsky scandal. The presentation is known for the quote "I did not have sexual relations with that woman, Miss Lewinsky." (6:07) (The audio only version of this speech can be found here)

Along with strong backing from traditional Democrats and liberals, Clinton was able to garner the support of moderates who appreciated his centrist "New Democrat" policies, which steered away from the expansion of government services of the New Deal and Great Society and allowed him to "triangulate", taking away many of the Republicans' top issues. One example of such compromises was welfare reform legislation signed into law in 1996. The new law required welfare recipients to work as a condition of benefits and imposed limits on how long individuals may receive payments, but did allow states to exempt 20% of their caseloads from the time limits. Clinton also pursued tough federal anti-crime measures, steering more federal dollars toward the war on drugs, and calling for the hiring of 100,000 new police officers. Compromise came with difficulty, though, as the parties failed to agree on a budget, causing the federal government to shut down in late 1995 into early 1996. By the end of his administration, the federal government had experienced the country's longest economic expansion and produced a budget surplus. The first year of the budget surplus was also the first year since 1969 in which the federal government did not borrow from the Social Security Trust Fund.

The 1996 Democratic National Convention in late August that nominated Clinton sparked protests, such as the one whereby Civil Rights Movement historian Randy Kryn and 10 others were arrested by the Federal Protective Service; later on, in November's 1996 presidential election, Clinton faced Bob Dole, Republican Senator from Kansas. An uninspired insider, Dole failed to attract the support of the GOP base and the incumbent president pulled to victory in the November election. Ross Perot ran for a second time, but was not allowed at the debate between Clinton and Dole and failed to attract as much support as he had in 1992. As a sign of the general cynicism and voter apathy during this period, turnout for the election was only 49%.

Many voters in 1992 and 1996 had been willing to overlook long-standing rumors of extramarital affairs by Clinton, deeming them irrelevant. These matters came to a head, however, in February 1998 when reports surfaced of ongoing sexual relations between Clinton and a White House intern, Monica Lewinsky. Clinton initially and vigorously denied the relationship; "I did not have sexual relations with that woman, Miss Lewinsky." His wife Hillary described the allegations as fraudulent smears dredged up by a "vast right-wing conspiracy." Clinton was forced to retract his assertions in August 1998 after the Lewinsky matter came under investigation by independent counsel Kenneth Starr. Clinton was impeached in the United States House of Representatives, but acquitted at his trial by the U.S. Senate. A public backlash forced Speaker Gingrich to resign after a poor showing in the 1998 midterm elections. In 1999, Republican Dennis Hastert of Illinois became Speaker of the House, a position he would hold until 2007, making him the longest-serving Republican Speaker of the House.

=== George W. Bush administration ===
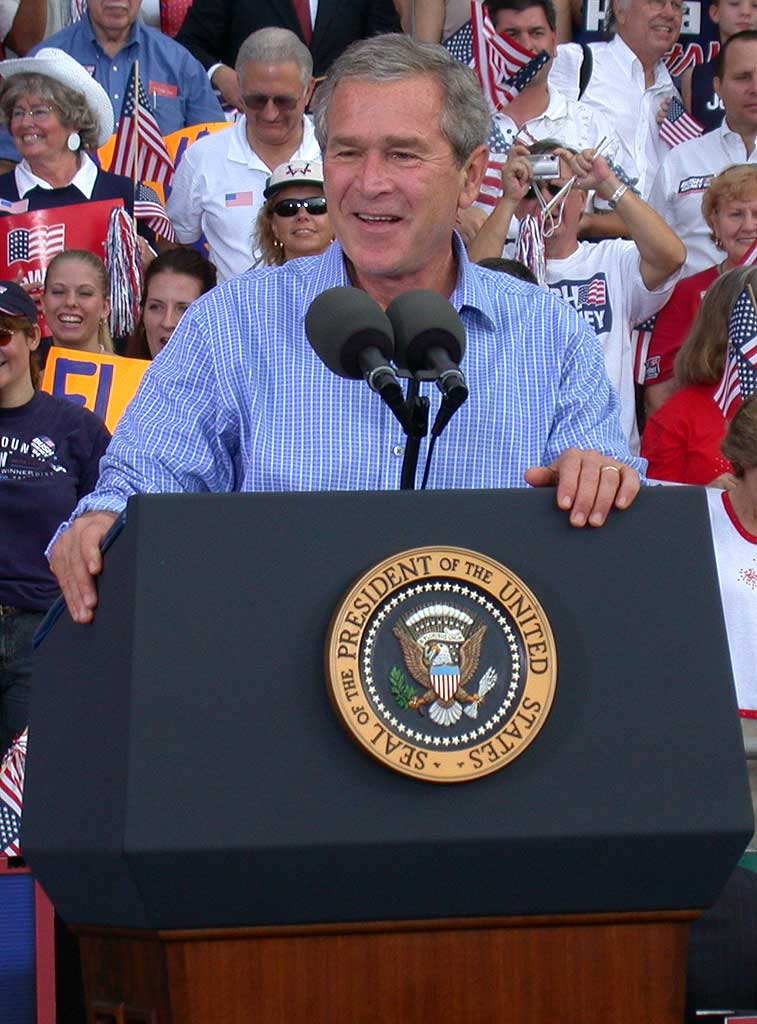
George W. Bush speaks at a campaign rally in 2004.

Though his 2000 election had been the focus of intense controversy which led eventually to a U.S. Supreme Court ruling in Bush v. Gore where the court ruled 5–4 in the former's favor by siding with the State of Florida's official vote count, Governor George W. Bush was sworn in as president on January 20, 2001. This made the 2000 election the third presidential election in which the electoral vote winner did not receive at least a plurality of the popular vote. Early in his term, Bush signed a $1.3 trillion federal tax cut aimed at revitalizing the economy, but the wars in the Middle East as well as assorted domestic spending packages passed by the Republican Congress led to ballooning Federal deficits. Other laws enacted in his first term included the No Child Left Behind Act education reform bill in 2002, the Partial-Birth Abortion Ban Act in 2003 and the Medicare Prescription Drug, Improvement, and Modernization Act in 2004. The first eight months of his term in office were relatively uneventful; however, it had become clear by that time that the economic boom of the late 1990s was at an end. The year 2001 was plagued by a nine-month recession, witnessing the end of the boom psychology and performance, with output increasing only 0.3% and unemployment and business failures rising.

On September 11, 2001, al-Qaeda terrorists hijacked four commercial airliners and attacked the World Trade Center and the Pentagon in the September 11 attacks, killing nearly 3,000 and injuring over 6,000 people. Osama bin Laden claimed responsibility for the attacks. President Bush ordered all flights grounded and U.S. airspace remained closed for the rest of the week. An emergency bailout package for the airline industry was passed, and stocks fell dramatically when markets re-opened the following week. In response to the attacks, the Bush administration and Congress passed the controversial PATRIOT Act, aimed at enhancing security, and established the Department of Homeland Security, a mass consolidation of many federal agencies charged with investigation, intelligence, and emergency management. A new Terrorist Finance Tracking Program monitored the movements of terrorists' financial resources but was discontinued after being revealed by The New York Times. Telecommunication usage by known and suspected terrorists was studied through the NSA electronic surveillance program. On October 7, 2001, the United States invaded Afghanistan as part of a global war on terrorism, aimed at rooting out al-Qaeda, the Taliban, and other terrorist organizations.

In mid-2002, President Bush announced that Iraq possessed chemical and nuclear weapons and posed a "clear and present danger" to stability in the Middle East. Plans for a full-scale military invasion of the country began amid widespread controversy. Antiwar protests occurred around the US and numerous other countries, mostly carried out by left-wing organizations, but some on the right and various military and diplomatic figures also doubted the wisdom of this venture. Regardless, the invasion of Iraq commenced on March 20, 2003. The Iraqi Army disintegrated without much resistance and within three weeks, US troops entered Baghdad to an overjoyed mob of Iraqi civilians who proceeded to tear down the giant statue of Saddam Hussein in the middle of the city. Bush announced on May 1, 2003, from an aircraft carrier that major combat operations in Iraq were completed, with a "Mission Accomplished" banner serving as a backdrop. Although the war was initially popular, a guerrilla insurgency quickly began mostly by Al Qaeda operatives who had entered the country. Led by Abu Musab al-Zarqawi, a wave of bombings and beheadings of captives occurred, including the highly publicized killing of government contractor Nick Berg. Zarqawi was killed by US troops in 2005. Ineffective policing strategies led to a mounting death toll among soldiers, but eventually in 2007 a campaign known as "The Surge" began where the US Army launched a large-scale anti-terrorism offensive. Along with the help of Iraqi locals unhappy with the destruction caused by (largely foreigner) Al Qaeda agents, the surge resulted in the end of most major violence in the country. Late in 2003, Hussein was captured, and was subsequently put to trial before the Iraqi people and executed in 2006.

Meanwhile, the economy recovered from the early 2000s economic recession, with GDP growth rising to 7% in the middle of 2003, with continued growth through the mid-2000s. The unemployment rate peaked at 6% in 2003, before falling in 2004 and 2005, and dropping below 5% in 2006 and 2007.

President George W. Bush was re-elected in November 2004, defeating Democratic contender Senator John Kerry in the electoral vote, and receiving 50.7% of the popular vote against John Kerry's 48.3%. Republicans also made gains in both houses of Congress. President Bush's reelection was assured by public support for the war on terror, the dour Senator Kerry's lack of appeal to his voter base, and the excessive attacks made on the president by the left, which helped turn public opinion against them. In addition, it came out that Kerry, a Vietnam War veteran, had participated in antiwar protests after returning home in 1970, including throwing away his medals.

Some major acts in President Bush's second term included the Energy Policy Act of 2005, the Safe, Accountable, Flexible, Efficient Transportation Equity Act, and the Troubled Asset Relief Program. After seeing high approval ratings for much of his first term, Bush's popularity plummeted to record lows in his second term, due to his handling of the prolonged Iraq War, Hurricane Katrina, and the 2008 financial crisis.

Democrats swept to victory in the 2006 elections, making Representative Nancy Pelosi Speaker of the United States House of Representatives, the first woman in that position, and electing record numbers of women and minorities. Upon winning the elections, the Democrats drew up a 100-Hour Plan of policy proposals upon assuming power in Congress. Major components of the plan included a pay-as-you-go plan for reducing the deficit; enacting the 9/11 Commission recommendations; increasing the federal minimum wage to $7.25 an hour; allowing the government to negotiate directly with pharmaceutical companies to secure lower drug prices for Medicare patients; and ending large tax subsidies for big oil companies to help foster energy independence.

The 110th Congress did little to influence the war in Iraq besides passing a non-binding resolution against the Bush administration's troop surge. In addition, the House of Representatives passed a $124 billion emergency spending measure for war funding with the stipulation of a phased troop withdrawal. President Bush vetoed the bill because of the proposal of scaling down forces, making this the second veto of his term.

During the months of May–June 2007, Senator Ted Kennedy and other senators co-sponsored the Comprehensive Immigration Reform Act of 2007. The purpose of this bill called for immigration reform under the intent of bringing amnesty and citizenship. On June 28 the Senate voted 53–45 for cloture, with 60 votes needed, spelling the end to the 2007 Immigration Bill.

=== Start of the Great Recession ===
US Employment Statistics (unemployment rate and monthly changes in net employment), 2009–2016; the US unemployment rate topped 8% (one month even reaching 10% level) from 2009 to 2012 during the Great Recession.

In 2007, while US unemployment dropped to its lowest level since the year 2000, the housing bubble reached its peak and economic growth slowed down, and by December 2007, the United States entered the severe long-lasting Great Recession. By mid-2008, property values and the values of other assets plummeted, and the stock market crashed in October 2008, spurred by a lack of investor confidence as the liquidity of assets began to evaporate. With the decline in wealth and the lack of investor and consumer confidence, growth and economic activity came to a screeching halt and the job growth of previous years was soon wiped out, with mass layoffs and unemployment rising rapidly in late 2008, and continuing into 2009.

Federal Reserve chairman Ben Bernanke told a federal commission in November 2009, "As a scholar of the Great Depression, I honestly believe that September and October of 2008 was the worst financial crisis in global history, including the Great Depression." Of the 13 most important US financial institutions, "12 were at risk of failure within a period of a week or two".

The Federal Reserve and the Treasury cooperated by pouring trillions into a financial system that had frozen up worldwide. They rescued many of the large financial corporations from bankruptcy – with the exception of Lehman Brothers, which went bankrupt – and took government control of insurance giant AIG, mortgage banks Fannie Mae and Freddie Mac, and both General Motors and Chrysler.

In October 2008, Bush sought, and Congress passed, the Emergency Economic Stabilization Act of 2008 (commonly referred to as the "bank bailout") with the goal of protecting the US financial system from complete collapse in the wake of the recession, which brought significant declines in the stock market. The bill provided federal government guarantees of up to $700 billion to troubled financial institutions through the Troubled Asset Relief Program (TARP). By 2010, only a fraction of that money was ever spent, as banks were able to quickly repay loans from the federal government or ended up never needing the money.

Meanwhile, unemployment doubled to nearly 10%, with states such as California and Michigan especially hard hit. While the stock market rebounded by 2011, and corporate profits had recovered, unemployment remained over 9% into 2011. The recession was worldwide, with Europe and Japan hard hit, while China, India and Canada fared much better.

=== Obama administration ===
The nation went into the 2008 election cycle having a Republican president and Democratic Congress both with extremely low approval ratings. New York Senator Hillary Clinton had the inside track for the nomination but faced an unexpected challenge from Barack Obama, the nearly unknown junior Senator from Illinois. The GOP nominated Arizona Senator John McCain. During the general election, Obama's youthfulness, charisma, and widespread media support proved effective against McCain, seen as a stodgy Washington insider. In addition, his relatively advanced age (72) and injuries from captivity in the Vietnam War drew doubts over his health and stamina. Overall disillusionment with the Republican Party and George Bush's administration did not help McCain's cause, and his choice of Alaska governor Sarah Palin as his running mate also drew some controversy. Obama also drew some doubts over his inexperience and controversial associations with Weather Underground founder William Ayers and Reverend Jeremiah Wright, the pastor of an African-American church Obama had attended for years who was discovered to have made anti-white sermons. The decisive event was the collapse of the national financial system over the summer, launching a severe worldwide depression. On November 4, 2008, Obama defeated McCain 365 to 173 in the electoral vote and 52.9% to 45.7% in the popular vote to become the 44th president of the United States, making history in becoming the first African American to be elected to the highest executive office. Part of the strong showing came from a surge of support from younger voters, African Americans, Hispanics and independents. Democrats made further gains in Congress, adding to the majorities they had won in 2006.

Obama's early policy decisions addressed the Great Recession and have included changes in tax policies, foreign policy initiatives and the phasing out of detention of prisoners at the Guantanamo Bay detention camp in Cuba. Within a few weeks of taking office, the new president and Congress passed the American Recovery and Reinvestment Act of 2009, which was ostensibly aimed at recovering from the economic collapse. This entailed a $700 billion stimulus package for the economy, although there were considerable questions over the amount of money spent or its actual effectiveness.

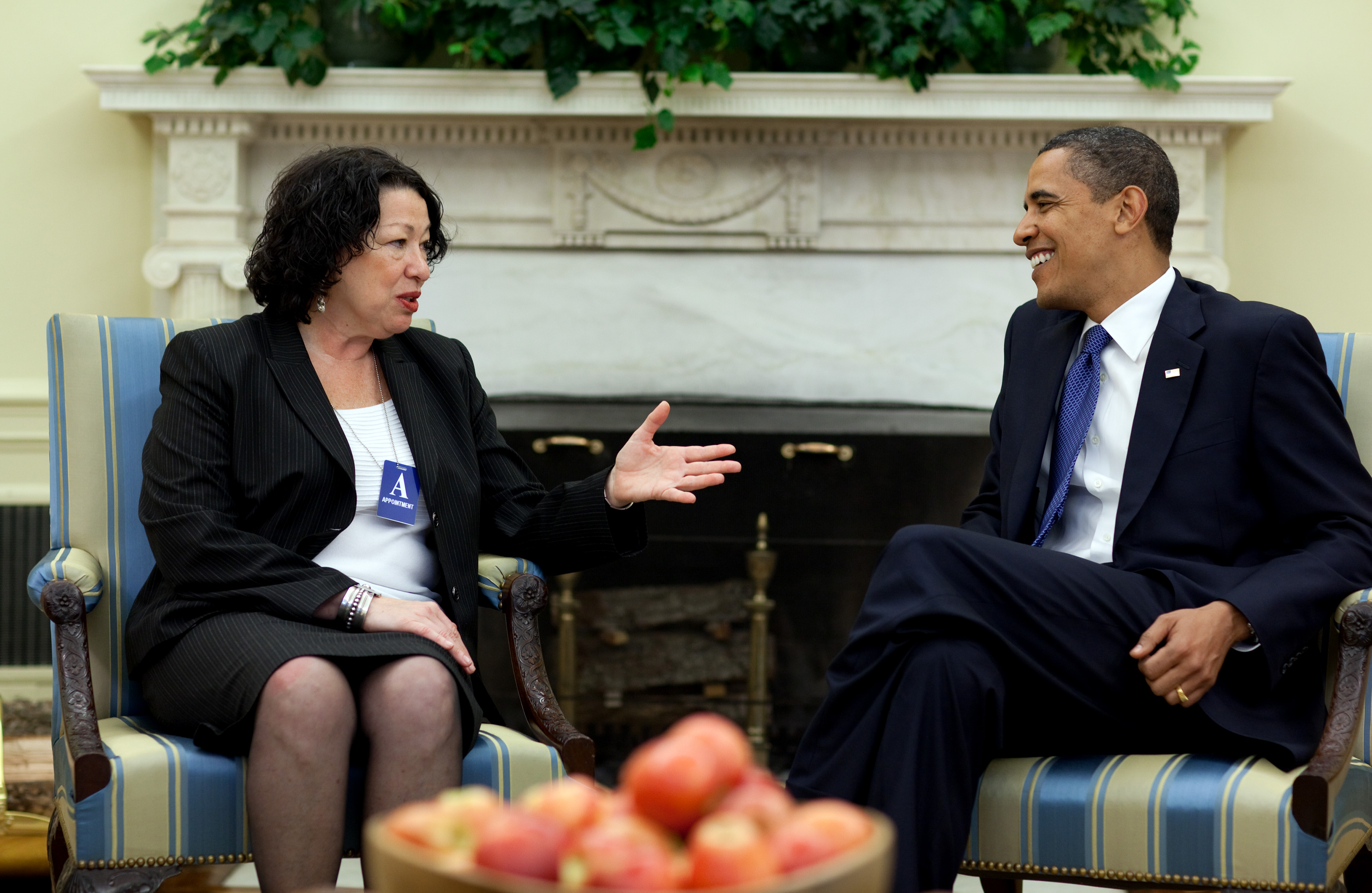
Barack Obama and Sonia Sotomayor sitting in front of the Oval Office fireplace

A domestic initiative passed by the 111th Congress and signed into law by President Obama was the Affordable Care Act, an important statute guaranteeing comprehensive medical coverage to all Americans, regardless of age, sex, pre-existing health conditions or ability to pay. The Don't Ask, Don't Tell Repeal Act, which allowed openly gay people to serve in the military, was enacted in 2010.

In foreign policy, President Obama withdrew US troops from Iraq in large numbers, bringing the Iraq War to an end in December 2011. At the same time, he also increased troop levels in the Afghanistan War. Early in his presidency, he successfully negotiated the New START treaty with the Russian Federation, which made significant reductions in their nuclear arsenals. The US also maintained ongoing talks, led by Secretary of State Hillary Clinton, with North Korea over its nuclear weapons program, as well as with Israel and the Palestinian Authority over a two-state solution to the Israeli–Palestinian conflict. In May 2011, President Obama announced in a televised speech to the nation that al-Qaeda leader and culprit behind multiple deadly acts of terrorism (including the September 11 attacks) Osama bin Laden was killed by US forces at a compound in Abbottabad, Pakistan.

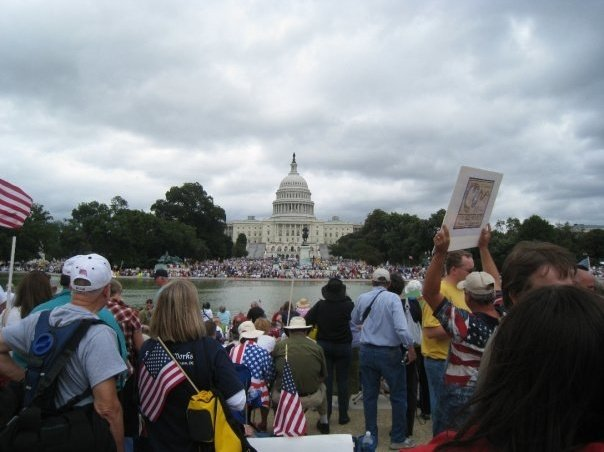
Tea Party protesters on the West Lawn of the US Capitol and the National Mall at the Taxpayer March on Washington in September 2009

Although the recession reached its bottom in June 2009 and began to move up again, voters remained frustrated with the slow pace of the economic recovery. In the spring of 2009, large protests erupted in Washington, DC from conservative groups who began calling themselves the "Tea Party" and who were particularly opposed to the controversial stimulus act. The Tea Party would end up in a few years as a springboard for a large-scale Republican revival. In the 2010 midterms, the GOP retook control of the House, although the Senate remained in Democratic hands.

Under the new Congress, which had a Republican House and a Democratic Senate, President Obama and Congress clashed for months over whether or not to raise the debt ceiling and whether or not to extend the payroll tax cuts for middle-income citizens that Obama signed into law. After months of heated debate, the debt ceiling was ultimately raised and the tax cuts extended. However, Obama's approval ratings continued to hover at around 46%, while Congress had an even lower approval rating of 11%.

In the 2012 presidential election, the GOP nominated former Massachusetts governor Mitt Romney. Much like John McCain four years earlier, Romney was largely seen as a tepid moderate and a Beltway insider who did not inspire the conservative base of the Republican Party, nor independents. He also drew controversy for his stand on Obamacare, which had been based on the system he implemented as Governor of Massachusetts. Obama defeated his opponent to win a second term, with a tally in the Electoral College by 332 to 206 and in the popular vote by 51.06% to 47.21%. The electoral map remained the same as 2008, with the exception of North Carolina and Indiana flipping back as red states, and the party balance in Congress remained largely unchanged.

In the November 2014 midterm elections, the Republican Party took control of the Senate and expanded its majority in the House of Representatives, an event that portended an ill omen for the Democrats.

On December 17, 2014, President Barack Obama announced a restoration of full diplomatic relations with Cuba for the first time since 1961. A deal between the United States and Cuba was brokered during 18 months of secret talks hosted by Canada, with a final meeting hosted by Pope Francis at the Vatican. Although the US embargo remains in effect and ordinary tourism by Americans is still prohibited, the United States will ease travel restrictions, release three Cuban spies, and open an embassy in Havana.

The New York Times reported in January 2015:

In short: The state of union, while far stronger than when Mr. Obama took office, remains troubled. The financial crisis has ended, with job growth picking up and the American economy among the world's strongest right now. Yet the great 21st-century wage slowdown continues, with pay raises for most workers still meager. In other positive news, the deficit has fallen sharply, thanks to a combination of slower health-cost growth and budget cuts (the latter championed by Republicans). Many more people have health insurance, thanks to Mr. Obama's health law. More people are graduating from college—although Mr. Obama is likely to fall short of his vow to have the United States lead the world in college graduates by 2020.

On the negative side, climate change appears to be accelerating, creating serious health and economic risks. The fall in gasoline prices, though welcome for many struggling families, won't help the climate. And with Mr. Obama delivering his address the day after Martin Luther King's Birthday, it's also worth remembering that the country's racial divides remain deep, with African-Americans still far behind other Americans by many measures.

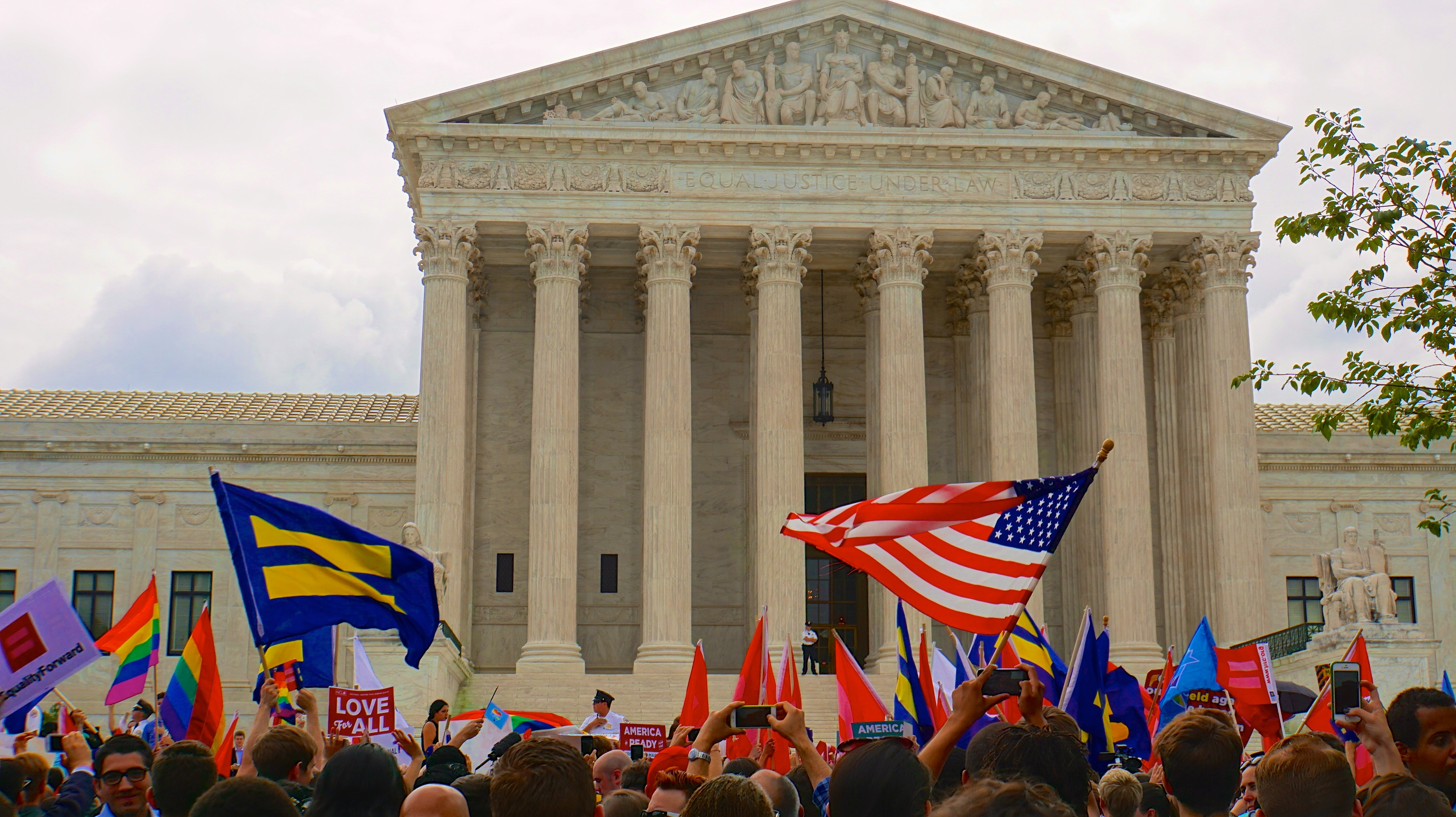
Outside the Supreme Court, a crowd celebrates the Court's decision that same-sex marriage is a constitutionally protected right under the 14th Amendment, a key win for gay rights.

On June 26, 2015, the Supreme Court ruled, 5–4, in the case of Obergefell v. Hodges that same-sex marriage was a constitutionally protected right under the 14th Amendment. Shortly before the ruling, polling showed the majority of Americans approving of same-sex marriage. The ruling was celebrated by many, and President Obama advertised his support for the ruling by coloring the White House in gay pride colors using lights. This ruling was not achieved without controversy, as it did little to change the minds of those that disapproved of homosexuality in general.

In regards to the Supreme Court, President Obama faced three vacancies during his administration. Justice David Souter retired in June 2009 and the president nominated as his replacement Sonia Sotomayor, the first Hispanic Supreme Court Justice in US history. Justice John Paul Stevens retired exactly one year later and Obama replaced him with Elena Kagan. Justice Antonin Scalia died on February 13, 2016. President Obama nominated Merrick Garland as his replacement, but the United States Senate, led by Republican Majority Leader Mitch McConnell refused to give Garland a hearing, instead arguing that the winner of the ongoing presidential election be given the opportunity to nominate Scalia's replacement instead. Justice Ruth Bader Ginsburg was pressured by liberal groups to retire while the Democrats remained in control of the White House, but declined to do so.

On September 25, 2015, John Boehner announced that he would step down as Speaker and resign from Congress at the end of October 2015. Boehner's resignation took place after Pope Francis' address to Congress the day before, an event considered by Boehner as a high point in his legislative career. Boehner was replaced by Republican Paul Ryan, the U.S. representative for Wisconsin's 1st congressional district and former candidate for vice president along with Mitt Romney. Sources in Boehner's office indicated he was stepping aside in the face of increasing discord while trying to manage passage of a continuing resolution to fund the government. Conservative opposition to funding Planned Parenthood as part of the resolution, and stronger threats to Boehner's leadership on account of the controversy, prompted the abrupt announcement. Members of the caucus indicated that the resignation opened the way for a "clean bill" for government funding to pass, and "a commitment [was] made that there [would] be no shutdown."

== Social change ==
=== "A Post-Racial Nation" ===
Some Americans saw the presidential candidacy of Barack Obama, and his election in 2008 as the first black president of the United States, as a sign that the nation had, in fact, become post-racial. The conservative radio host Lou Dobbs, for example, said in November 2009, "We are now in a 21st-century post-partisan, post-racial society." Two months later, Chris Matthews, an MSNBC host, said of President Obama, "He is post-racial by all appearances. You know, I forgot he was black tonight for an hour."

However, public opinion on whether the United States is post-racial is itself divided starkly by race. In a Washington Post/ABC News poll conducted in December 2014, about 50% of white respondents said they believed that the justice system treats Americans of all races equally, but only 10% of African Americans said the same. In the spring of 2015, according to a Gallup poll, 13 percent of black Americans surveyed identified race relations as the most important problem the United States faces, compared with 4 percent of white Americans.

Arguments that the United States is not post-racial frequently emphasize the treatment of African Americans and other racial minorities in the criminal justice system and in interactions with the police. Killings of unarmed African Americans, often by police officers, have been widely publicized. In 2015, according to a study by The Guardian, police officers in the United States killed 7.13 black Americans per million, compared with 2.91 white Americans per million. Additionally:

Young black men were nine times more likely than other Americans to be killed by police officers in 2015, according to the findings of a Guardian study that recorded a final tally of 1,134 deaths at the hands of law enforcement officers this year. Despite making up only 2% of the total US population, African-American males between the ages of 15 and 34 comprised more than 15% of all deaths logged this year by an ongoing investigation into the use of deadly force by police. Their rate of police-involved deaths was five times higher than for white men of the same age.

Such killings had a marked effect on public perceptions of race relations in America. The 13 percent of black Americans who called race relations the most pressing problem in the United States in the spring 2015 Gallup poll dwarfed the 3 percent that Gallup reported at the beginning of 2014. And the percentage of white Americans who said race relations were the most important issue rose to 4 percent in 2015 from 1 percent in 2014.

In response to high-profile incidents such as the fatal shootings of Michael Brown, Aiyana Jones, Trayvon Martin, Laquan McDonald, Tamir Rice, and Walter Scott, and the death of Freddie Gray from a spinal-cord injury sustained in police custody, academics and journalists have denounced claims that America is post-racial. Ta-Nehisi Coates wrote in The Atlantic in 2015 that the phrase "post-racial" was "usually employed by talk-show hosts and news anchors looking to measure progress in the Obama era." And Anna Holmes wrote in The New York Times, "Chattel slavery and the legacies it left behind continue to shape American society. Sometimes it seems as if the desire for a 'post-racial' America is an attempt by white people to liberate themselves from the burden of having to deal with that legacy."

The divide in public opinion on the status of race in America was reflected in reactions to the Black Lives Matter movement. In response to the "black lives matter" rallying cry, some people, including politicians, began using the phrase "all lives matter". In August 2015, after a sheriff's deputy in Harris County, Texas, was fatally shot while pumping gas, Sheriff Ron Hickman claimed that the rhetoric of Black Lives Matter activists had contributed to the killing and said, "We’ve heard 'black lives matter'. All lives matter. Well, cops’ lives matter, too. So why don't we just drop the qualifier and just say 'lives matter', and take that to the bank.' Supporters of the Black Lives Matter movement criticized the "all lives matter" phrase, arguing that it minimized the systemic threats faced by African Americans. President Obama said in October, "There is a specific problem that is happening in the African-American community that's not happening in other communities." Andrew Rosenthal wrote, similarly, in The New York Times, "The point of 'Black Lives Matter' is that the lives of African-Americans have come under special and deadly threat since before the birth of this country."

Evidence of continued racial divisions in the United States can also be found in demographics. For instance, African Americans account for less than 15 percent of the total population of Michigan, but more than 82 percent of the population of the state's largest city, Detroit — and Detroit, like many cities whose residents are predominantly black, has "self-segregated schools, dwindling tax bases and decaying public services".

=== African Americans and law enforcement ===
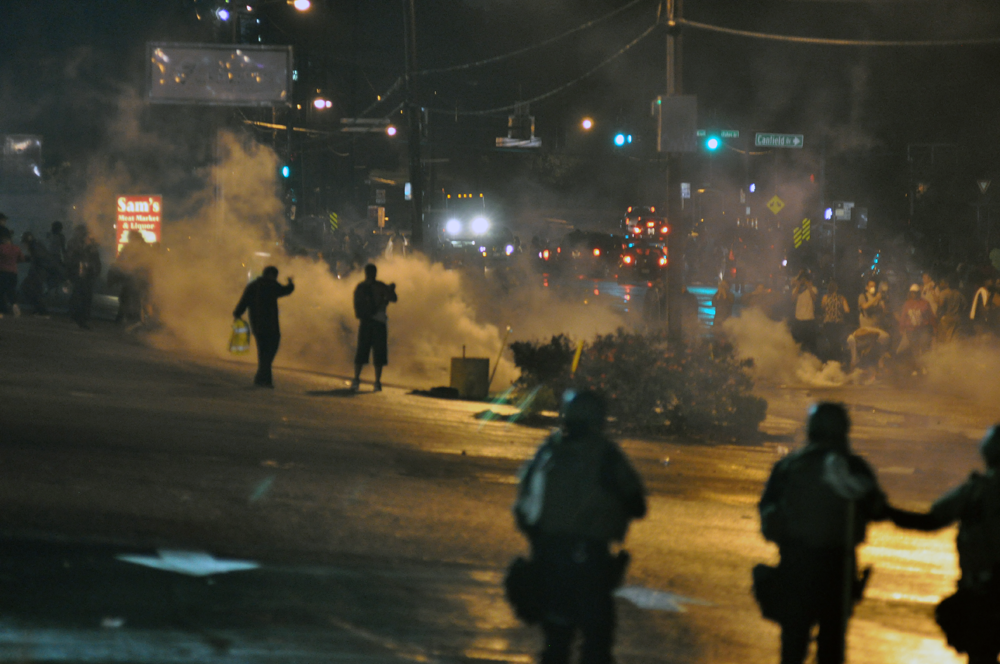
Civil unrest in Ferguson, Missouri, as police clash with protesters in the wake of the shooting of Michael Brown

Even after the end of the crack epidemic, there remained a large disparity in crime rates between black people and whites, with black people accounting for 28% of arrests in 2013; over 50% of homicides and robberies where the race of the offender was known were committed by black suspects. As most crime is intraracial, most of their victims were black as well, and crime remained concentrated within black communities. Due to high crime rates, many inner city areas were heavily policed, often by police forces drawn from the population of the greater urban area rather than the local, primarily black, population, resulting in many black people feeling that they were being discriminated against by law enforcement. By 2009, black people accounted for 39.4% of the prison population in the United States. The incarceration rate of black males was over six times higher than that of white males, with a rate of 4,749 per 100,000 US residents.

In August 2014, Darren Wilson, a white policeman in Ferguson, Missouri shot and killed Michael Brown, an 18-year-old unarmed black man who had robbed a nearby convenience store fifteen minutes earlier. While a grand jury investigation found that Wilson had acted in self-defense after Brown attacked him on two separate occasions, locals hostile to the police claimed that Brown had been gunned down while surrendering. Racial tensions in Ferguson between the mainly black population and mainly white police force led to both peaceful protests and riots, and several buildings were looted and set on fire. In response, the Ferguson Police Department deployed military-grade riot gear and riot control weaponry to disperse crowds and maintain order. Further protests erupted after the death of Eric Garner, a 43-year-old black resident of Staten Island, New York who died after being put in a nineteen-second long chokehold by New York City Police Department officer Daniel Pantaleo while resisting arrest. Garner was being investigated by the NYPD under suspicion of illegally selling cigarettes. Pantaleo's acquittal by a grand jury in December led to nationwide protests by a movement which came to call itself Black Lives Matter.

== See also ==
- Presidency of George H. W. Bush
- Presidency of Bill Clinton
- Presidency of George W. Bush
- Presidency of Barack Obama
- Timeline of United States history
- Timeline of modern American conservatism
- Timeline of the history of the United States (1990–2009)
- 1990s
- 2000s
