= National fiscal policy responses to the Great Recession =

Beginning in 2008, many nations of the world enacted fiscal stimulus plans in response to the Great Recession. These nations used different combinations of government spending and tax cuts to boost their sagging economies. Most of these plans were based on the Keynesian theory that deficit spending by governments can replace some of the demand lost during a recession and prevent the waste of economic resources idled by a lack of demand. The International Monetary Fund recommended that countries implement fiscal stimulus measures equal to 2% of their GDP to help offset the global contraction. In subsequent years, fiscal consolidation measures were implemented by some countries in an effort to reduce debt and deficit levels while at the same time stimulating economic recovery.

== Americas ==
=== United States ===
In 2008, the United States Congress passed—and then-President George W. Bush signed—the Economic Stimulus Act of 2008, a $152 billion stimulus designed to help stave off a recession. The bill primarily consisted of $600 tax rebates to low and middle income Americans.

The United States combined many stimulus measures into the American Recovery and Reinvestment Act of 2009, a $787 billion bill covering a variety of expenditures from rebates on taxes to business investment. $184.9 billion was to be spent in 2009, and $399.4 billion was to be spent in 2010 with the remainder of the bill's appropriations spread over the rest of the decade. Announcements of rescue plans were associated with positive returns whereas a public intervention in favor of a specific bank showed negative impacts.

== Asia ==
=== China ===
A statement on the government's website said the State Council had approved a plan to invest 4 trillion yuan in infrastructure and social welfare by the end of 2010. This stimulus, equivalent to US$586 billion, represented a pledge comparable to that subsequently announced by the United States, but which came from an economy only one third the size. The stimulus package will be invested in key areas such as housing, rural infrastructure, transportation, health and education, environment, industry, disaster rebuilding, income-building, tax cuts, and finance.

China's export driven economy started to feel the impact of the economic slowdown in the United States and Europe, and the government had already cut key interest rates three times in less than two months in a bid to spur economic expansion.

The stimulus package was welcomed by world leaders and analysts as larger than expected and a sign that by boosting its own economy, China is helping to stabilize the world economy. World Bank President Robert Zoellick declared that he was 'delighted' and believed that China was 'well positioned given its current account surplus and budget position to have fiscal expansion.' News of the announcement of the stimulus package sent markets up across the world.

=== Japan ===
In April 2009, Japan announced a third stimulus plan of 15.4 trillion yen stimulus ($153 billion). This new plan includes 1.6 trillion yen investment in low-carbon technology, 1.9 trillion yen on employment programs, and 370 billion yen for new car subsidies. The legislature responded to a request from Prime Minister Taro Aso for a stimulus that equal to 2% of GDP. Japan has been one of the hardest hit nations during the recession, having already experienced a lost decade when economic growth stagnated. Japan's total stimulus amounts to 5% of its GDP. Since taking office, Prime Minister Aso has passed 25 trillion yen ($250bn) in stimulus. Japan has basically exhausted its conventional monetary policy options with a near zero nominal interest rate.

=== South Korea ===
South Korea ₩14 trillion (equivalent to ₩19.99 trillion or US$14.92 billion in 2025) stimulus package were released in November 2008. The November package includes 4.6 trillion won for regional infrastructure and 3 trillion won in tax break—mainly for factory investment. South Korea's stimulus totaled

In April 2009 South Korea enacted a "cash for clunkers" program that will give a tax break of ₩2.5 million (equivalent to ₩3.47 million or US$2,592.2 in 2025) to drivers who replace a car nine years old or older with a new car. The tax break will be in effect from May to December 2009 and is estimated to boost Hyundai sales from 530,000 to 580,000 and Kia sales from 327,000 to 357,000.

South Korea's 2009 budget includes $13bn in employment stimulus including handouts, training, and infrastructure. South Korea's total stimulus in 2008-2009 amounts to about ₩69 trillion (equivalent to ₩95.89 trillion or US$71.54 billion in 2025).

== Europe ==
=== European Union ===
The European Union passed a 200 billion euro plan with member countries developing their own national plans, worth 170bn to 200bn euro in total, and an EU-wide plan of 30bn euro coming from EU funding. The European Commission recommends that member nations' stimulus plans amount to at least 1.2% of GDP.

In subsequent years, some European Union countries have undertaken fiscal consolidation.

=== Germany ===
Compared to other European nations, Germany was in a unique position: It had low debt, a high balance of trade, and an export driven economy. The recession led to a decline in German exports, but Germany had the capacity to replace some of the export demand with domestic stimulus. The Germans were initially hesitant to pass a large stimulus bill; however, in 2009, the Germany passed a 50bn euro stimulus bill that focused on taxes, a child tax credit, and spending on transportation and education. Prior to the 2009 stimulus, one of Germany's largest stimulus efforts had been a scrappage program. The German stimulus program included a "cash for clunkers" program that offers rebates of $3,172 to Germans who scrap their old cars for new, more efficient models. The program totals about 5 billion euros.

=== Hungary ===
Hungary has a high level of debt and cannot effectively raise the money needed for deficit spending. They have unveiled a $7bn package of tax cuts and loan guarantees directed towards businesses, especially small and medium-sized enterprises.

=== The Netherlands ===
In November 2008, the Dutch government passed a 6bn euro plan that mainly consisted of tax breaks for businesses that made larger investments and hired short-term workers. The package also included a new program to help find work for the unemployed, and faster public sector investment. In January 2009, the Dutch added a variety of guarantees to help ensure and encourage exports, corporate loans, and home and hospital construction.

=== United Kingdom ===
In 2008, the United Kingdom was one of the major economies leading calls for fiscal action to stimulate aggregate demand. Throughout that year a number of fiscal measures were introduced including a £145 tax cut for basic rate (below £34,800 pa earnings) tax payers, a temporary 2.5% cut in Value Added Tax (Sales Tax), £3 billion worth of investment spending brought forward from 2010 and a variety of other measures such as a £20 billion Small Enterprise Loan Guarantee Scheme. The total cost of these measures, mostly announced in the November 2008 Pre-Budget Report was roughly £20 billion (not counting loan guarantees). Further limited measures worth £5 billion were unveiled in the 2009 budget including training help for the young unemployed and a "car scrappage" scheme which offered £2,000 in subsidy for a new car purchase for the scrapping of a car more than 10 years old (similar to schemes in Germany and France).

After 2008, the UK was limited in its ability to take discretionary fiscal action by the significant burden that bank bail-outs had on public finances. This contributed to a significant rise in the deficit to an estimated £175 billion (12.4% of GDP) in 2009-10 and a rise in the national debt above 80% of GDP at its peak. Nonetheless, the UK has significant automatic stabilisers which contributed far more than discretionary action and more than most other countries. As a result, further discretionary fiscal action was limited.

In 2010, the UK began a fiscal consolidation program after the Labour government's fiscal stimulus package was withdrawn and the new Conservative–Liberal Democrat coalition government implemented spending cuts and increases in indirect taxation. Additional fiscal consolidation measures continued under the Conservative government elected in 2015.

== Oceania ==
=== Australia ===
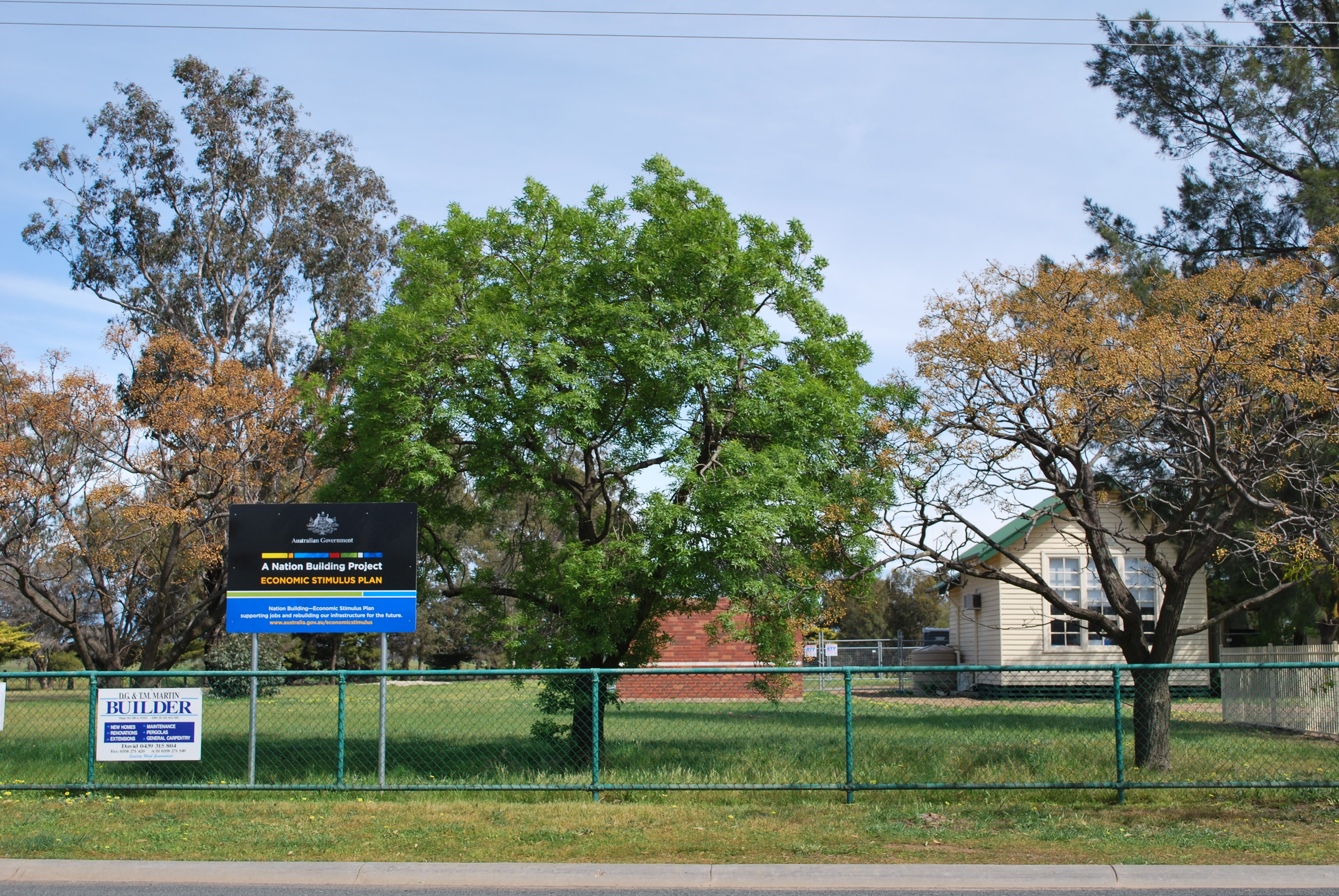
A school in Australia with signage proclaiming the works as part of the "Economic Stimulus Plan"

==== First stimulus ====
In October 2008, the Rudd government implemented a A$10 billion stimulus package with the support of the Senate crossbench. The package included:

- $4.8 billion direct payments to pensioners (single pensioners-$1400, pensioner couples-$2100)
- $3.9 billion for low and middle income; families ($1000 per child)
- $1.5 billion 'Home Buyers Boost' to help first home buyers
- $187 million to create 56,000 new training places in 2008–09
- Accelerate three nation-building funds and investment in nation building projects to 2009

==== Second stimulus ====
In February 2009, the Rudd government implemented a A$42 billion 'Nation Building and Jobs Plan' stimulus package again with the support of the Senate crossbench. The package included:

- $12.7 billion for immediate one-off payments to working Australians, families with school-age children, farmers, single income families and for those undergoing training (A$900 for the average single worker)
- $14.7 billion to be spent on the Building the Education Revolution program which built school infrastructure and maintenance and brought forward funding for trade training centres
- $6.6 billion to increase the national stock of public and community housing by about 20,000
- $3.9 billion to provide free insulation to 2.7 million homes and solar hot water rebates
- $2.7 billion in small and general business tax breaks to provide deductions for some equipment purchases before the end of June 2009.
- $890 million to fix regional roads and blackspots, to install railway boom gates and for regional and local government infrastructure.

==== Outcome ====
Australia avoided recession and its growth figures were internationally very high, whilst unemployment remained comparatively low, despite net public sector debt remaining substantially low. It has been disputed as to whether fiscal policy actually helped Australia avoid recession however, with sources citing high NGDP growth, healthy trading partners, a responsible banking industry, no housing collapse, a booming population, and the Australian mining boom.

The packages were praised by various business groups, economists, the International Monetary Fund (IMF) and the Organisation for Economic Co-operation and Development (OECD).

== Evaluations ==
Pope Francis, in his 2015 encyclical letter Laudato si', was critical on national responses and said that the 2008 financial crisis provided an opportunity to develop a new economy, more attentive to ethics, and new ways of regulating speculation wealth. But the response to the crisis did not include rethinking the outdated criteria which continue to rule the world.
